= United States Marine Corps =

Naval infantry branch of the U.S. military

- Emblem of the United States Marine Corps
- Founded: 11 July 1798 (228 years, 4 months) (in current form) 10 November 1775 (251 years) (as the Continental Marines)
- Country: United States
- Type: Naval infantry
- Role: Amphibious warfare; Expeditionary warfare
- Size: 168,527 active personnel (as of December 2024); 32,967 reserve personnel (as of December 2024); 1,317 crewed aircraft (Note: Total USMC crewed aircraft excludes 25 Executive Office helicopters of HMX-1, assigned to the White House Military Office.)
- Part of: United States Armed Forces; Department of the Navy
- Headquarters: The Pentagon; Arlington County, Virginia, U.S.
- Nicknames: "Jarheads", "Devil Dogs" ("Teufels Hunde"), "Leathernecks"
- Motto: Semper fidelis ("Always faithful")
- Colors: Scarlet and gold
- March: "Semper Fidelis"
- Mascot: English bulldog
- Anniversaries: 10 November
- Equipment: List of USMC equipment
- Engagements: See list: American Revolutionary War; Quasi-War; First Barbary War; War of 1812; Second Barbary War; West Indies Anti-Piracy Operations; Seminole Wars; African Anti-Slavery Operations; Aegean Sea Anti-Piracy Operations; First Sumatran expedition; Second Sumatran expedition; United States Exploring Expedition; Capture of Monterey; Mexican–American War; Bombardment of Greytown; Battle of Ty-ho Bay; First Fiji Expedition; Second Opium War; Third Fiji expedition; Paraguay expedition; Reform War; John Brown's raid; American Civil War; Bombardment of Qui Nhon; Shimonoseki Campaign; Formosa Expedition; United States expedition to Korea; Egyptian Expedition (1882); Bering Sea Anti-Poaching Operations; Overthrow of the Kingdom of Hawaii; Second Samoan Civil War; Banana Wars; Spanish–American War; Second Occupation of Cuba; Border War; Negro Rebellion; Occupation of Nicaragua; Occupation of Haiti; Occupation of the Dominican Republic (1916); Sugar Intervention; Philippine–American War; Boxer Rebellion; World War I; Russian Civil War; World War II; Korean War; Vietnam War; 1958 Lebanon Crisis; Occupation of the Dominican Republic (1965); Iranian hostage rescue; Multinational Force in Lebanon; Operation Urgent Fury; 1986 bombing of Libya; Tanker War; Operation Earnest Will; Operation Prime Chance; Operation Eager Glacier; Operation Nimble Archer; Operation Praying Mantis; Operation Just Cause; Persian Gulf War; Somali Civil War; American military intervention in Somalia (2007–present); Somali Civil War (2009–present); Iraqi no-fly zones; Bosnian War; Kosovo War; 1999 East Timorese crisis; Operation Enduring Freedom; Afghanistan; Philippines; Horn of Africa; Pankisi Gorge; Trans Sahara; Caribbean and Central America; Iraq War; Pakistan-United States skirmishes; Operation Odyssey Dawn; 2014 intervention against ISIL; Operation Inherent Resolve; Resolute Support Mission; Battle of Khasham; Operation Southern Spear; Ecuadorian conflict (2024–present); 2026 Iran war
- Decorations: Presidential Unit Citation Joint Meritorious Unit Award Navy Unit Commendation Valorous Unit Award Meritorious Unit Commendation French Croix de guerre 1914–1918 Philippine Presidential Unit Citation Korean Presidential Unit Citation Vietnam Gallantry Cross Vietnam Civil Actions Medal
- Website: marines.mil

Commanders
- Commander-in-Chief: President Donald Trump
- Secretary of Defense: Pete Hegseth
- Secretary of the Navy: Hung Cao (acting)
- Commandant: Gen Eric M. Smith
- Assistant Commandant: Gen Bradford J. Gering
- Sergeant Major of the Marine Corps: SMMC Carlos A. Ruiz

Insignia
- Flag

- Seal

- Emblem ("Eagle, Globe, and Anchor" or "EGA") (Note: Variations also used as a "Branch of Service Insignia" on Marine Corps uniforms)

- Wordmark
- Song: "The Marines' Hymn"

The United States Marine Corps (USMC), also referred to as the United States Marines or simply the Marines, is the naval infantry service branch of the United States Armed Forces. The service is responsible for conducting expeditionary and amphibious warfare through combined arms, implementing its own infantry, artillery, aerial, and special operations forces. The U.S. Marine Corps is a part of the United States Department of Defense and is one of the six armed forces of the United States and one of the eight uniformed services of the United States.

The Marine Corps has legally been part of the United States Department of the Navy since 30 June 1834, along with its sister service, the United States Navy, though it has been under the de facto direction of the Navy Department since its establishment. (Note: Even prior to 1834, the Marine Corps operated administratively and operationally under the direction of the Navy Department.) The USMC operates installations on land and aboard sea-going amphibious warfare ships around the world. Several of the Marines' tactical aviation squadrons, primarily Marine Fighter Attack squadrons, are embedded in Navy carrier air wings and operate from aircraft carriers. These comprise the bulk of the US military's V/STOL aircraft, with 313 V-22 Ospreys, 183 F-35B Lightning IIs, and 78 AV-8B Harrier IIs as of 2025.

The history of the Marine Corps began when two battalions of Continental Marines were formed on 10 November 1775 in Philadelphia as a service branch of infantry troops capable of fighting both at sea and on shore. In the Pacific theater of World War II, the Corps took the lead in a massive campaign of amphibious warfare, advancing from island to island. As of December 2024, the USMC has around 169,000 active duty members and some 33,000 personnel in reserve.

== Mission ==
As outlined in 10 U.S.C. § 5063 and as originally introduced under the National Security Act of 1947, the three primary areas of responsibility for the U.S. Marine Corps are:

- Seizure or defense of advanced naval bases and other land operations to support naval campaigns;
- Development of tactics, technique, and equipment used by amphibious landing forces in coordination with the Army and Air Force; and
- Such other duties as the president or Department of Defense may direct.

This last clause derives from similar language in the congressional acts "For the Better Organization of the Marine Corps" of 1834 and "Establishing and Organizing a Marine Corps" of 1798. In 1951, the House of Representatives' Armed Services Committee called the clause "one of the most important statutory – and traditional – functions of the Marine Corps". It noted that the Marine Corps has more often than not performed actions of a non-naval nature, including its famous actions in Tripoli, the War of 1812, Chapultepec, and numerous counterinsurgency and occupational duties, such as those in Central America, World War I, and the Korean War. While these actions are not accurately described as support of naval campaigns nor as amphibious warfare, their common thread is that they are of an expeditionary nature, using the mobility of the Navy to provide timely intervention in foreign affairs on behalf of American interests.

The Marine Band, dubbed the "President's Own" by John Adams, provides music for state functions at the White House. Marines from Ceremonial Companies A & B, quartered in Marine Barracks, Washington, D.C., guard presidential retreats, including Camp David. The Marines of the Executive Flight Detachment of HMX-1 provide helicopter transport to the president and vice president, with the radio call signs "Marine One" and "Marine Two", respectively. The Executive Flight Detachment also provides helicopter transport to Cabinet members and other VIPs. The Marine Security Guard of the Marine Embassy Security Command provide security for American embassies, legations, and consulates at more than 140 posts worldwide.

The relationship between the Department of State and the U.S. Marine Corps is nearly as old as the Marine Corps itself. For over 200 years, marines have served at the request of secretaries of state. After World War II, an alert, disciplined force was needed to protect American embassies, consulates, and legations throughout the world. In 1947, a proposal was made that the Department of Defense furnish Marine Corps personnel for Foreign Service guard duty under the provisions of the Foreign Service Act of 1946. A formal memorandum of agreement was signed between the Department of State and the secretary of the Navy in December 1948, and 83 marines were deployed to overseas missions. During the first year of the program, 36 detachments were deployed worldwide.

=== Historical mission ===
The Marine Corps was founded to serve as an infantry unit aboard naval vessels. Marines were responsible for the security of the ship and its crew by conducting offensive and defensive combat during boarding actions and defending the ship's officers from mutiny; to the latter end, their quarters on the ship were often strategically positioned between the officers' quarters and the rest of the vessel. Continental Marines crewed raiding parties, both at sea and ashore. America's first amphibious assault landing occurred early in the Revolutionary War, on 3 March 1776, as the Marines gained control of Fort Montagu and Fort Nassau, a British ammunition depot and naval port in New Providence, the Bahamas.

The role of the Marine Corps has expanded significantly since then. As the importance of its original naval mission declined with changing naval warfare doctrine and the professionalization of the naval service, the Corps adapted by focusing on formerly secondary missions ashore. The Advanced Base Doctrine of the early 20th century codified their combat duties ashore, outlining the use of marines in the seizure of bases and other duties on land to support naval campaigns. In 1987, the USMC Sea School was closed. In 1998, all Marine detachments on board ships were disestablished.

Throughout the late 19th and 20th centuries, Marine detachments served aboard Navy cruisers, battleships, and aircraft carriers. Marine detachments served in their traditional duties as a ship's landing force, manning the ship's weapons and providing shipboard security. Marine detachments were augmented by members of the ship's company for landing parties, such as in the First Sumatran expedition of 1832 and continuing in the Caribbean and Mexican campaigns of the early 20th centuries. Marines developed tactics and techniques of amphibious assault on defended coastlines in time for use in World War II. During World War II, marines continued to serve on capital ships, and some were assigned to man anti-aircraft batteries.

In 1950, President Harry Truman responded to a message from U.S. representative Gordon L. McDonough. McDonough had urged President Truman to add Marine representation on the Joint Chiefs of Staff. President Truman, writing in a letter addressed to McDonough, stated, "The Marine Corps is the Navy's police force and as long as I am President that is what it will remain. They have a propaganda machine that is almost equal to Stalin's." McDonough then inserted President Truman's letter, dated 29 August 1950, into the Congressional Record.

Congressmen and Marine organizations reacted, calling President Truman's remarks an insult, and demanded an apology. Truman apologized to the Marine commandant at the time, writing, "I sincerely regret the unfortunate choice of language which I used in my letter of August 29 to Congressman McDonough concerning the Marine Corps." While Truman had apologized for his metaphor, he did not alter his position that the Marine Corps should continue to report to the Navy secretary. He made amends only by making a surprise visit to the Marine Corps League a few days later, when he reiterated, "When I make a mistake, I try to correct it. I try to make as few as possible." He received a standing ovation.

When gun cruisers were retired in the late 1970s, the remaining Marine detachments were only seen on battleships and carriers. Its original mission of providing shipboard security ended in the 1990s.

=== Capabilities ===
The Marine Corps fulfills a critical military role as an amphibious warfare force. It is capable of asymmetric warfare with conventional, irregular, and hybrid forces. While the Marine Corps does not employ any unique capabilities, as a force, it can rapidly deploy a combined-arms task force to almost anywhere in the world within days. The basic structure for all deployed units is a Marine Air-Ground Task Force (MAGTF) that integrates a ground combat element, an aviation combat element, and a logistics combat element under a common command element. While the creation of joint commands under the Goldwater–Nichols Act has improved interservice coordination between each branch, the Marine Corps's ability to permanently maintain integrated multielement task forces under a single command provides a smoother implementation of combined-arms warfare principles.

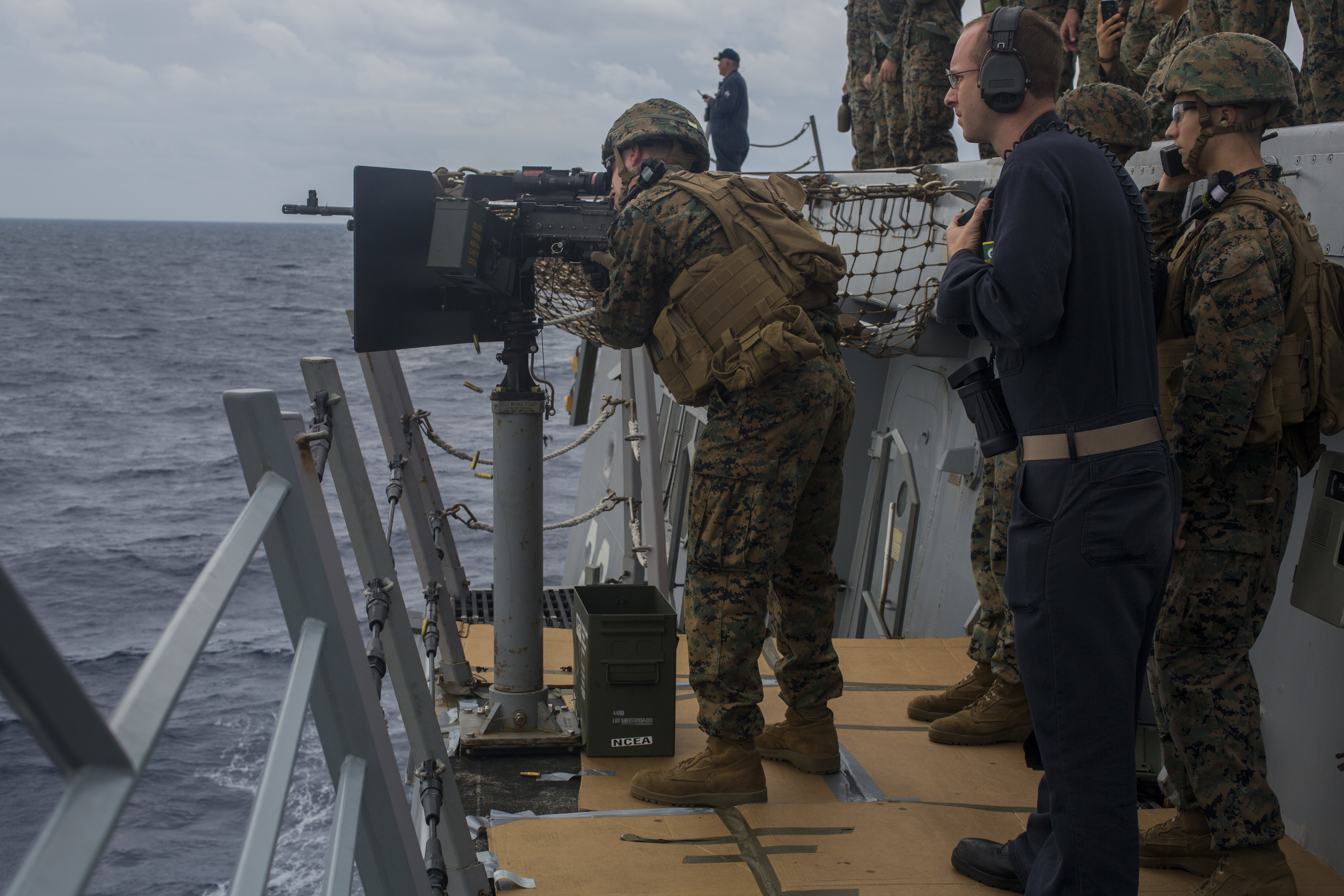
U.S. Marines from the 31st Marine Expeditionary Unit training

The close integration of disparate Marine units stems from an organizational culture centered on the infantry. Every other Marine capability exists to support the infantry. Unlike some Western militaries, the Corps remained conservative against theories proclaiming the ability of new weapons to win wars independently. For example, Marine aviation has always been focused on close air support and has remained largely uninfluenced by air power theories proclaiming that strategic bombing can single-handedly win wars.

This focus on the infantry is matched with the doctrine of "Every Marine [is] a rifleman", a precept of Commandant Alfred M. Gray, Jr., emphasizing the infantry combat abilities of every Marine. All Marines, regardless of military specialization, receive training as a rifleman, and all officers receive additional training as infantry platoon commanders. During World War II at the Battle of Wake Island, when all the Marine aircraft were destroyed, pilots continued the fight as ground officers, leading supply clerks and cooks in a final defensive effort. Flexibility of execution is implemented via an emphasis on "commander's intent" as a guiding principle for carrying out orders, specifying the end state but leaving open the method of execution.

The amphibious assault techniques developed for World War II evolved, with the addition of air assault and maneuver warfare doctrine, into the current "Operational Maneuver from the Sea" doctrine of power projection from the seas. The Marines are credited with developing helicopter insertion doctrine and were the earliest in the American military to widely adopt maneuver-warfare principles, which emphasize low-level initiative and flexible execution. In light of recent warfare that has strayed from the Marine Corps traditional missions, the Marines have renewed an emphasis on amphibious capabilities.

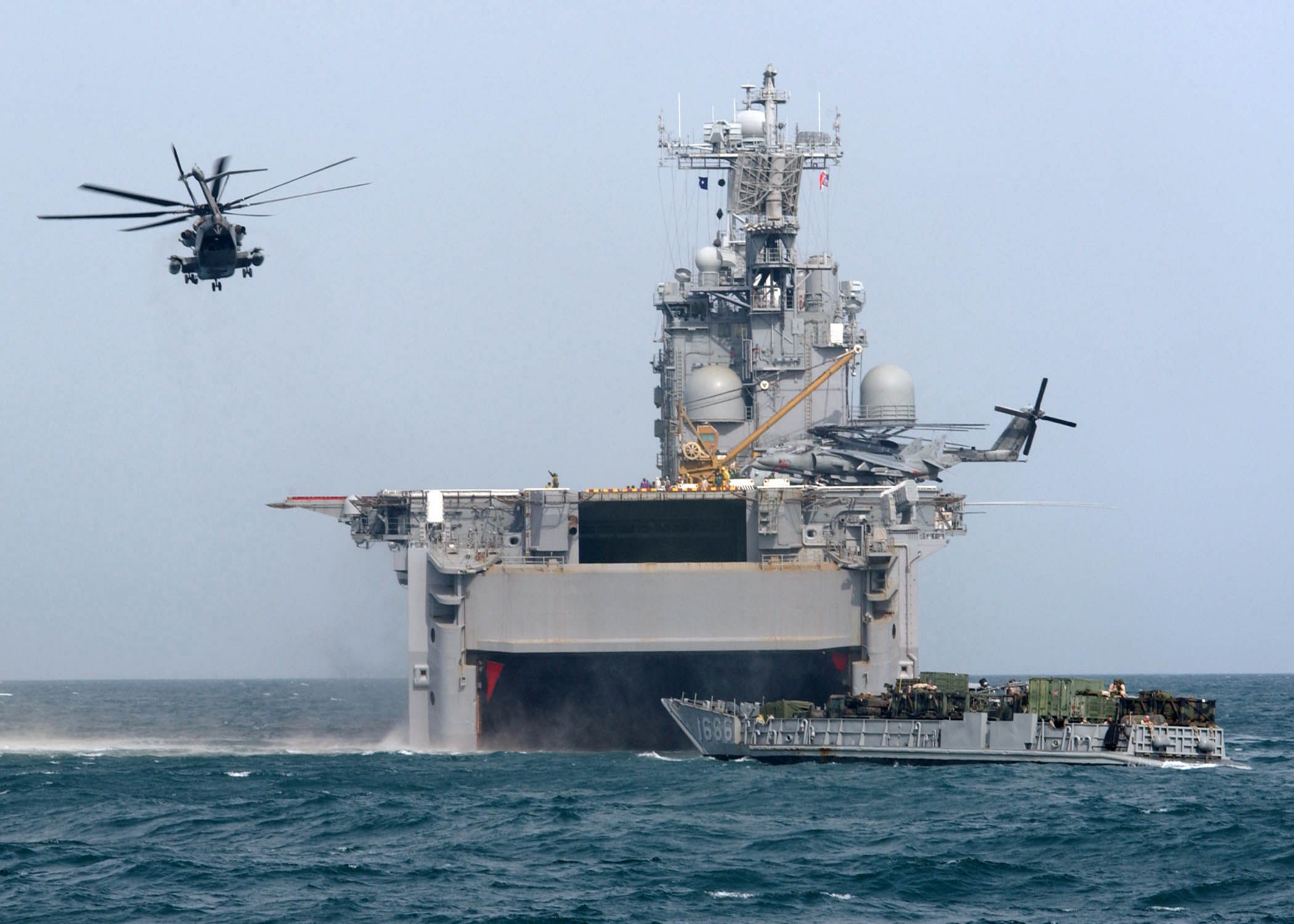
Marines from the 15th Marine Expeditionary Unit depart USS Tarawa (LHA-1), using both a Landing Craft Utility and CH-53E "Super Stallion" helicopters, during amphibious operations in Kuwait, 2003.

The Marine Corps relies on the Navy for sealift to provide its rapid deployment capabilities. In addition to basing a third of the Fleet Marine Force in Japan, Marine expeditionary units (MEU) are typically stationed at sea so they can function as first responders to international incidents. To aid rapid deployment, the Maritime Pre-Positioning System was developed: Fleets of container ships are positioned throughout the world with enough equipment and supplies for a Marine expeditionary force to deploy for 30 days.

=== Doctrine ===
Two small manuals published in the 1930s established USMC doctrine in two areas. The Small Wars Manual laid the framework for Marine counterinsurgency operations from Vietnam to Iraq and Afghanistan. The Tentative Landing Operations Manual established the doctrine for the amphibious operations of World War II. "Operational Maneuver from the Sea" was the doctrine of power projection in 2006.

== History ==
=== Foundation and American Revolutionary War ===
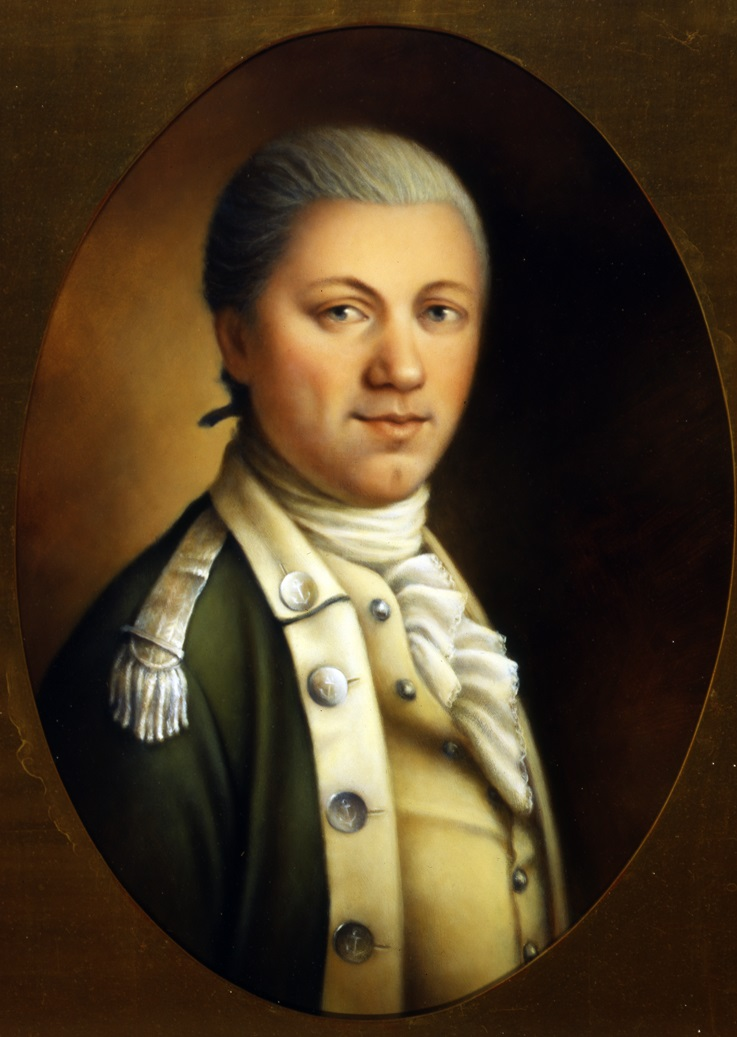
Maj. Samuel Nicholas, first commandant of the Marine Corps, was nominated to lead the Continental Marines by John Adams in November 1775.

The United States Marine Corps traces its roots to the Continental Marines of the American Revolutionary War, formed by Captain Samuel Nicholas by a resolution of the Second Continental Congress on 10 November 1775, to raise two battalions of marines. This date is celebrated as the birthday of the Marine Corps. Nicholas was nominated to lead the Marines by John Adams and commissioned as a captain on 28 November 1775. By December 1775, Nicholas raised one battalion of 300 men by recruitment in his home city of Philadelphia.

In January 1776, the Marines went to sea under the command of Commodore Esek Hopkins and in March undertook their first amphibious landing, the Battle of Nassau in the Bahamas, occupying the British port of Nassau for two weeks. On 3 January 1777, the Marines arrived at the Battle of Princeton attached to General John Cadwalader's brigade, where they had been assigned by General George Washington; by December 1776, Washington was retreating through New Jersey and, needing veteran soldiers, ordered Nicholas and the Marines to attach themselves to the Continental Army. The Battle of Princeton, where the Marines along with Cadwalader's brigade were personally rallied by Washington, was the first land combat engagement of the Marines; an estimated 130 marines were present at the battle.

At the end of the American Revolution, both the Continental Navy and Continental Marines were disbanded in April 1783. The institution was resurrected on 11 July 1798; in preparation for the Quasi-War with France, Congress created the United States Marine Corps. Marines had been enlisted by the War Department as early as August 1797 for service in the newly built frigates authorized by the congressional "Act to provide a Naval Armament" of 18 March 1794, which specified the numbers of marines to recruit for each frigate.

The Marines' most famous action of this period occurred during the First Barbary War (1801–1805) against the Barbary pirates, when William Eaton and First Lieutenant Presley O'Bannon led 8 marines and 500 mercenaries in an effort to capture Tripoli. Though they only reached Derna, the action at Tripoli has been immortalized in the Marines' Hymn and the Mameluke sword carried by Marine officers.

=== War of 1812 and afterward ===
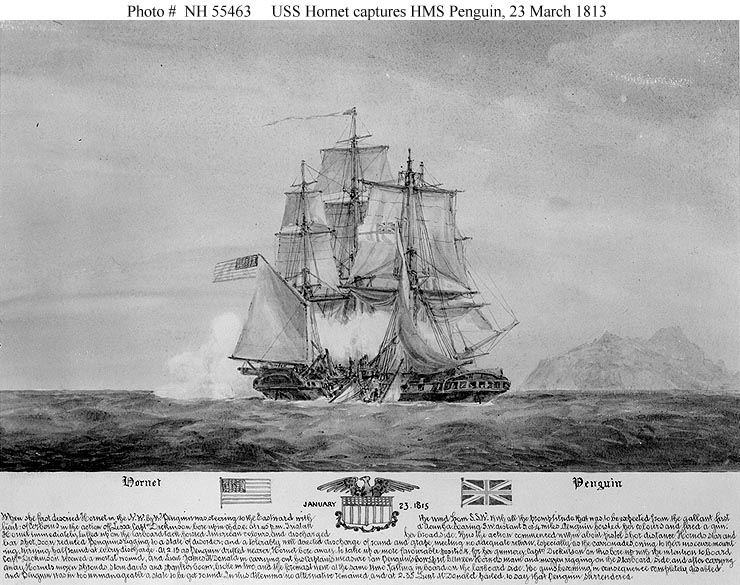
British and U.S. troops garrisoned aboard Hornet and Penguin exchanging small arms musket fire with Tristan da Cuna in the background during the final engagement between British and U.S. forces in the War of 1812

During the War of 1812, Marine detachments on Navy ships took part in some of the great frigate duels that characterized the war, which were the first and last engagements of the conflict. Their most significant contribution was holding the center of General Andrew Jackson's defensive line at the 1815 Battle of New Orleans, the final major battle and one of the most one-sided engagements of the war. With widespread news of the battle and the capture of HMS Cyane, HMS Levant and HMS Penguin, the final engagements between British and U.S. forces, the Marines had gained a reputation as expert marksmen, especially in defensive and ship-to-ship actions. They played a large role in the 1813 defense of Sacket's Harbor, New York and Norfolk and Portsmouth, Virginia, also taking part in the 1814 defense of Plattsburgh in the Champlain Valley during one of the final British offensives along the Canadian–U.S. border. The Battle of Bladensburg, fought 24 August 1814, was one of the worst days for American arms, though a few units and individuals performed heroic service. Notable among them were Commodore Joshua Barney's 500 sailors and the 120 marines under Captain Samuel Miller USMC, who inflicted the bulk of British casualties and were the only effective American resistance during the battle. A final desperate Marine counterattack, with the fighting at close quarters, however was not enough; Barney and Miller's forces were overrun. In all of 114 marines, 11 were killed and 16 wounded. During the battle Captain Miller's arm was badly wounded, for his gallant service in action, Miller was brevetted to the rank of Major USMC.

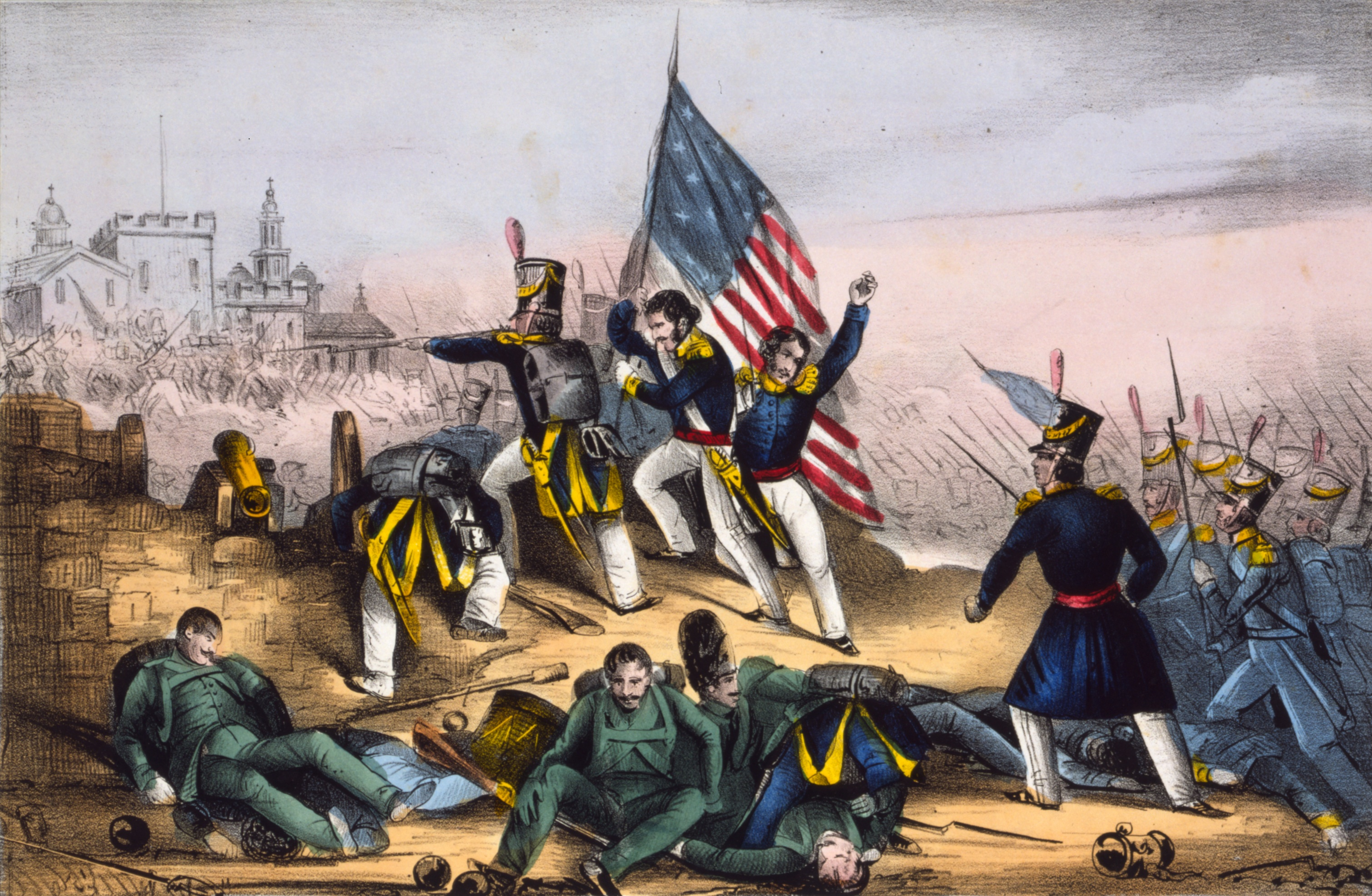
Marines storming Chapultepec Castle with a large American flag during the Mexican-American War

After the war, the Marine Corps fell into a malaise that ended with the appointment of Archibald Henderson as its fifth commandant in 1820. Under his tenure, the Corps took on expeditionary duties in the Caribbean, the Gulf of Mexico, Key West, West Africa, the Falkland Islands, and Sumatra. Commandant Henderson is credited with thwarting President Jackson's attempts to combine and integrate the Marine Corps with the Army. Instead, Congress passed the Act for the Better Organization of the Marine Corps in 1834, stipulating that the Corps was part of the Department of the Navy as a sister service to the Navy.

Commandant Henderson volunteered the Marines for service in the Seminole Wars of 1835, personally leading nearly half of the entire Corps (two battalions) to war. A decade later, in the Mexican–American War (1846–1848), the Marines made their famed assault on Chapultepec Palace in Mexico City, which would be later celebrated as the "Halls of Montezuma" in the Marines' Hymn. In fairness to the U.S. Army, most of the troops who made the final assault at the Halls of Montezuma were soldiers and not marines. The Americans forces were led by Army General Winfield Scott. Scott organized two storming parties of about 250 men each for 500 men total including 40 marines.

In the 1850s, the Marines engaged in service in Panama and Asia and were attached to Commodore Matthew Perry's East India Squadron on its historic trip to the Far East.

=== American Civil War to World War I ===
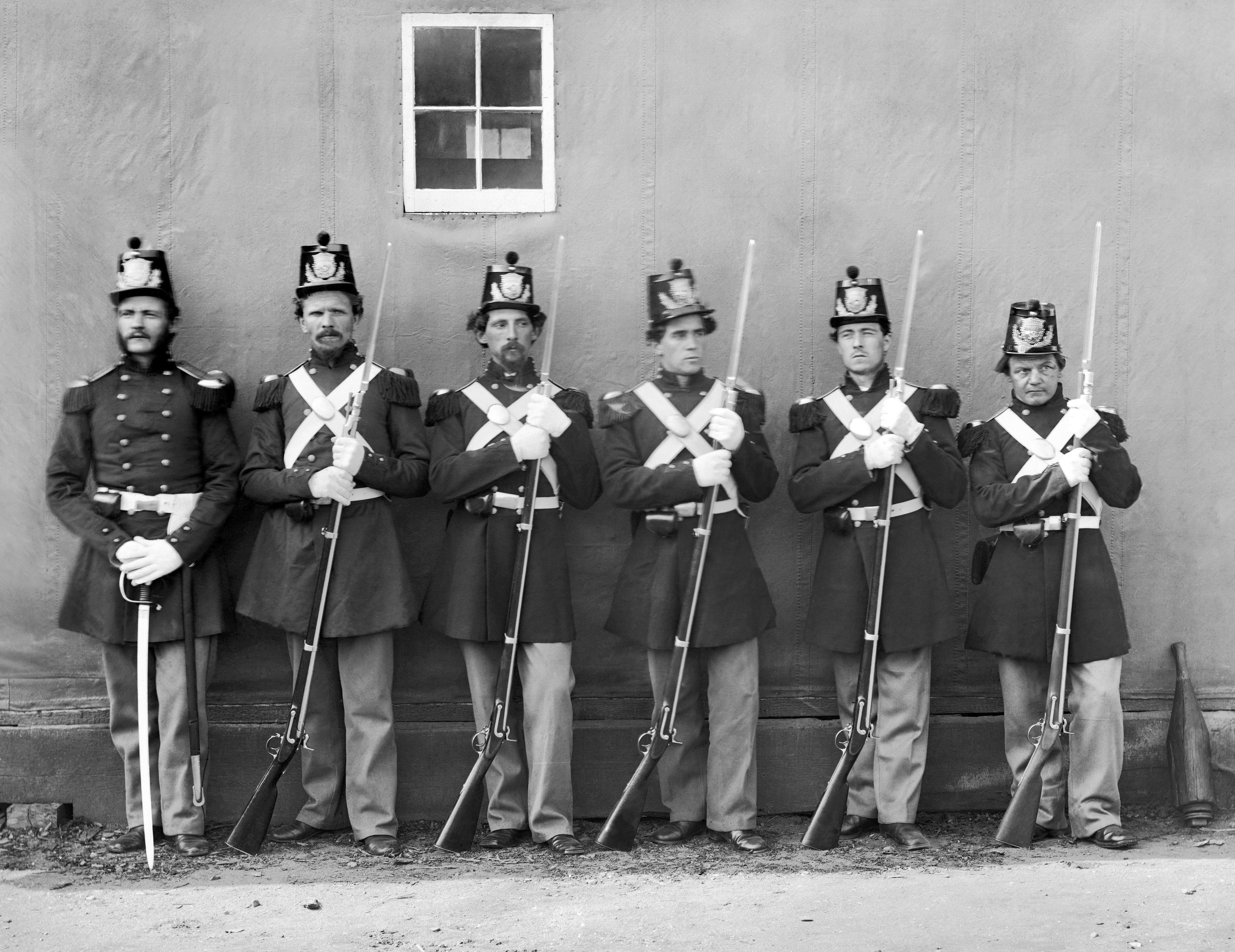
Five USMC privates with fixed bayonets, and their NCO with his sword at the Washington Navy Yard, 1864

The Marine Corps played a small role in the Civil War (1861–1865); their most prominent task was blockade duty. As more and more states seceded from the Union, about a third of the Marine Corps's officers left the United States to join the Confederacy and form the Confederate States Marine Corps, which ultimately played little part in the war. The battalion of recruits formed for the First Battle of Bull Run performed poorly, retreating with the rest of the Union forces. Blockade duty included sea-based amphibious operations to secure forward bases. In early November 1861, a group of sailors and Marines landed in the towns of Port Royal and Beaufort, South Carolina. A few days later that task force captured nearby Hilton Head Island. A couple of weeks later a reconnaissance in force group captured Tybee Island. This is where the Union set up the artillery barrage to bombard Fort Pulaski. In April and May 1862, Marines participated in the capture and occupation of New Orleans and the occupation of Baton Rouge, Louisiana, key events in the war that helped secure Union control of the lower Mississippi River basin and denied the Confederacy a major port and naval base on the Gulf Coast.

The remainder of the 19th century was marked by declining strength and introspection about the mission of the Marine Corps. The Navy's transition from sail to steam put into question the need for marines on naval ships. Meanwhile, marines served as a convenient resource for interventions and landings to protect American interests overseas. The Marine Corps was involved in over 28 separate interventions in the 30 years from the end of the American Civil War to the end of the 19th century. They were called upon to stem political and labor unrest within the United States. Under Commandant Jacob Zeilin's tenure, Marine customs and traditions took shape: the Corps adopted the Marine Corps emblem on 19 November 1868. It was during this time that "the Marines' Hymn" was first heard. Around 1883, the Marines adopted their current motto "Semper fidelis" (Always Faithful). John Philip Sousa, the musician and composer, enlisted as a Marine apprentice at age 13, serving from 1867 until 1872, and again from 1880 to 1892 as the leader of the Marine Band.

During the Spanish–American War (1898), marines led American forces ashore in the Philippines, Cuba, and Puerto Rico, demonstrating their readiness for deployment. A Marine contingent also participated in the capture of Guam during the war. At Guantánamo Bay, Cuba, the Marines seized an advanced naval base that remains in use today. Between 1899 and 1916, the Marine Corps continued its record of participation in foreign expeditions, including the Philippine–American War, the Boxer Rebellion in China, Panama, the Cuban Pacifications, the Perdicaris incident in Morocco, Veracruz, Santo Domingo, and the Banana Wars in Haiti and Nicaragua; the experiences gained in counterinsurgency and guerrilla operations during this period were consolidated into the Small Wars Manual.

=== World War I ===
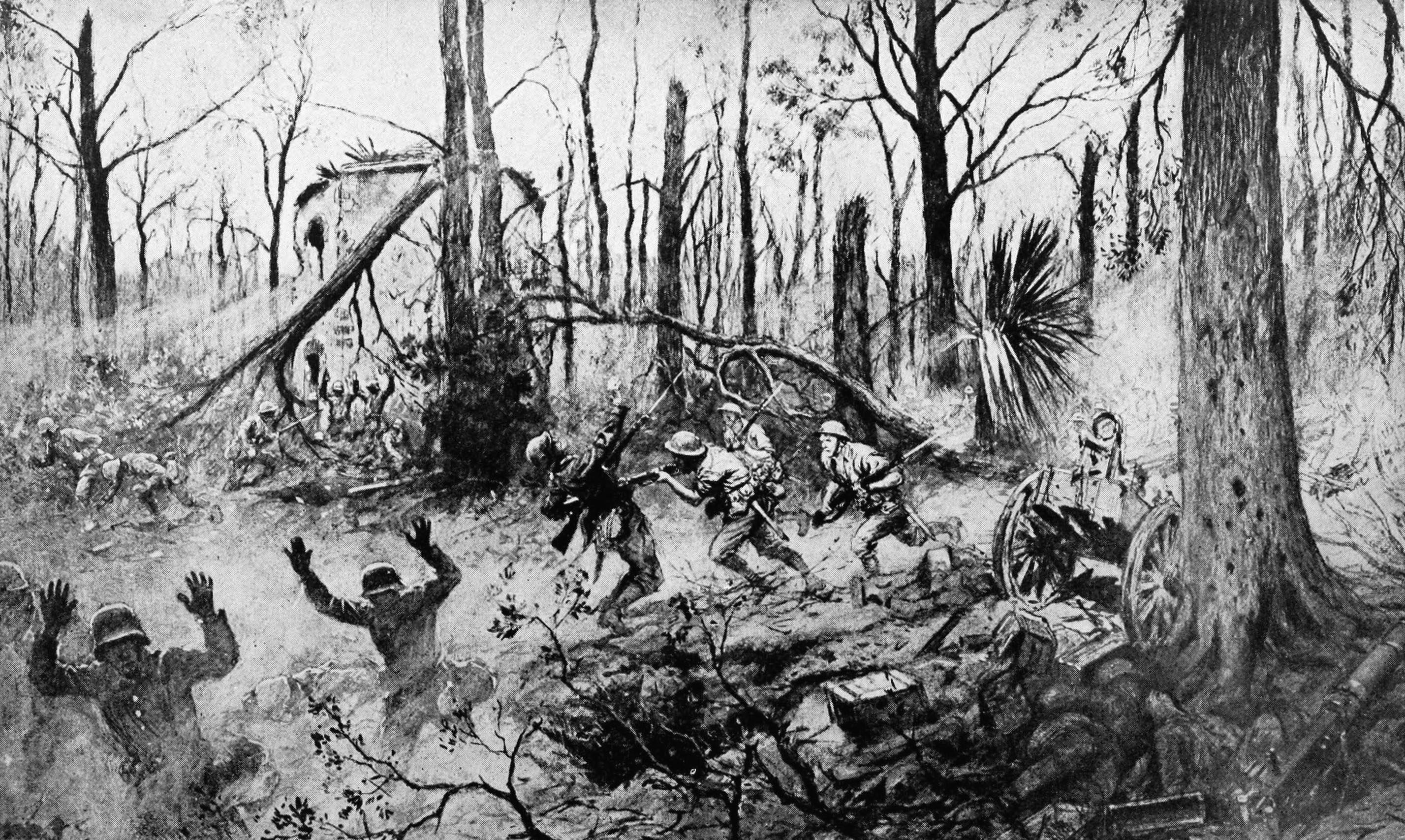
Georges Scott, American Marines in Belleau Wood, 1918

During World War I, marines served as a part of the American Expeditionary Force under General John J. Pershing when America entered into the war on 6 April 1917. The Marine Corps had a deep pool of officers and non-commissioned officers with battle experience and thus experienced a large expansion. The U.S. Marine Corps entered the war with 511 officers and 13,214 enlisted personnel and by 11 November 1918 had reached a strength of 2,400 officers and 70,000 enlisted. African-Americans were entirely excluded from the Marine Corps during this conflict. Opha May Johnson was the first woman to enlist in the Marines; she joined the Marine Corps Reserve in 1918 during World War I, officially becoming the first female Marine. From then until the end the war, 305 women enlisted in the Corps.

During the Battle of Belleau Wood in 1918, Marine Corps lore states that Germans had nicknamed the Marines Teufel Hunden, meaning "Devil Dogs", for their reputation as shock troops and marksmen at ranges up to 900 meters. However, this nickname—first used by the Marines themselves, according to the United States Marine Corps History Division—predated Belleau Wood in print by six weeks, and was likely an invention of an American war correspondent. Nevertheless, the nickname has endured.

=== Between the World Wars ===
United States Postal Service employees were killed and wounded in 1920 and 1921 during theft of money from the mail. President Warren G. Harding detailed a Marine Corps mail guard of approximately 53 officers and 2,200 enlisted men to guard post offices and ride on mail trucks and trains from November 1921 until the frequency of robberies was significantly reduced in March 1922. Robbery of the Elizabeth, New Jersey, postal facility on 14 October 1926 caused President Calvin Coolidge to reconstitute a mail guard of 2,500 marines under the command of General Smedley Butler to again discourage robbers.

Between the World Wars, the Marine Corps was headed by Commandant John A. Lejeune, and under his leadership, the Corps studied and developed amphibious techniques that would be of great use in World War II. Many officers, including Lieutenant Colonel Earl Hancock "Pete" Ellis, foresaw a war in the Pacific with Japan and undertook preparations for such a conflict. Through 1941, as the prospect of war grew, the Corps pushed urgently for joint amphibious exercises with the Army and acquired amphibious equipment that would prove of great use in the upcoming conflict.

=== World War II ===
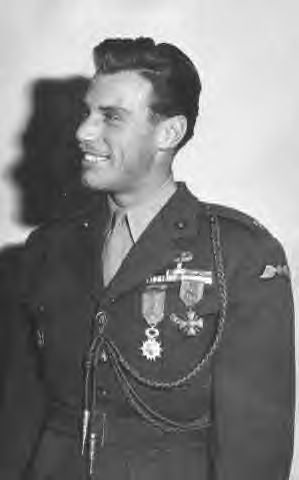
Former French Foreign Legion Lieutenant, and U.S. Marine Corps officer Peter J. Ortiz, who served in the European theater, often behind enemy lines

In World War II, the Marines performed a central role in the Pacific War, along with the U.S. Army. The battles of Guadalcanal, Bougainville, Tarawa, Guam, Tinian, Cape Gloucester, Saipan, Peleliu, Iwo Jima, and Okinawa saw fierce fighting between Marines and the Imperial Japanese Army. Some 600,000 Americans served in the U.S. Marine Corps in World War II.

The Battle of Iwo Jima, which began on 19 February 1945, was arguably the most famous Marine engagement of the war. The Japanese had learned from their defeats in the Marianas Campaign and prepared many fortified positions on the island including pillboxes and network of tunnels. The Japanese put up fierce resistance, but American forces reached the summit of Mount Suribachi on 23 February. The mission was accomplished with high losses of 26,000 American casualties and 22,000 Japanese.

The Marines played a comparatively minor role in the European theater. Nonetheless, they did continue to provide security detachments to U.S. embassies and ships, contributed personnel to small special ops teams dropped into Nazi-occupied Europe as part of Office of Strategic Services (OSS, the precursor to the CIA) missions, and acted as staff planners and trainers for U.S. Army amphibious operations, including the Normandy landings.

By the end of the war, the Corps had expanded from two brigades to six divisions, five air wings, and supporting troops, totaling about 485,000 Marines. In addition, 20 defense battalions and a parachute battalion were raised. Nearly 87,000 Marines were casualties during World War II (including nearly 20,000 killed), and 82 were awarded the Medal of Honor.

Photograph of the Marine Corps War Memorial, which depicts the second U.S. flag-raising atop Mount Suribachi, on Iwo Jima. The memorial is modeled on Joe Rosenthal's famous Raising the Flag on Iwo Jima.

In 1942, the Navy Seabees were created with the Marine Corps providing their organization and military training. Many Seabee units were issued the USMC standard issue and were re-designated "Marine". Despite the Marine Corps giving them their military organization and military training, issuing them uniforms, and redesignating their units, the Seabees remained Navy. (Note: See: 17th Marines, 18th Marines, 19th Marines, and 20th Marines) USMC historian Gordon L. Rottmann writes that one of the "Navy's biggest contributions to the Marine Corps during WWII was the creation of the Seabees."

Despite Secretary of the Navy James Forrestal's prediction that the Marine flag raising at Iwo Jima meant "a Marine Corps for the next five hundred years", the Corps faced an immediate institutional crisis following the war because of a suddenly shrunken budget. Army generals pushing for a strengthened and reorganized defense establishment attempted to fold the Marine mission and assets into the Navy and Army. Drawing on hastily assembled congressional support, and with the assistance of the so-called "Revolt of the Admirals", the Marine Corps rebuffed such efforts to dismantle the Marine Corps, resulting in statutory protection of the Marine Corps in the National Security Act of 1947. Shortly afterward, in 1952 the Douglas–Mansfield Act afforded the commandant an equal voice with the Joint Chiefs of Staff on matters relating to the Marines and established the structure of three active divisions and air wings that remain today.

=== Korean War ===
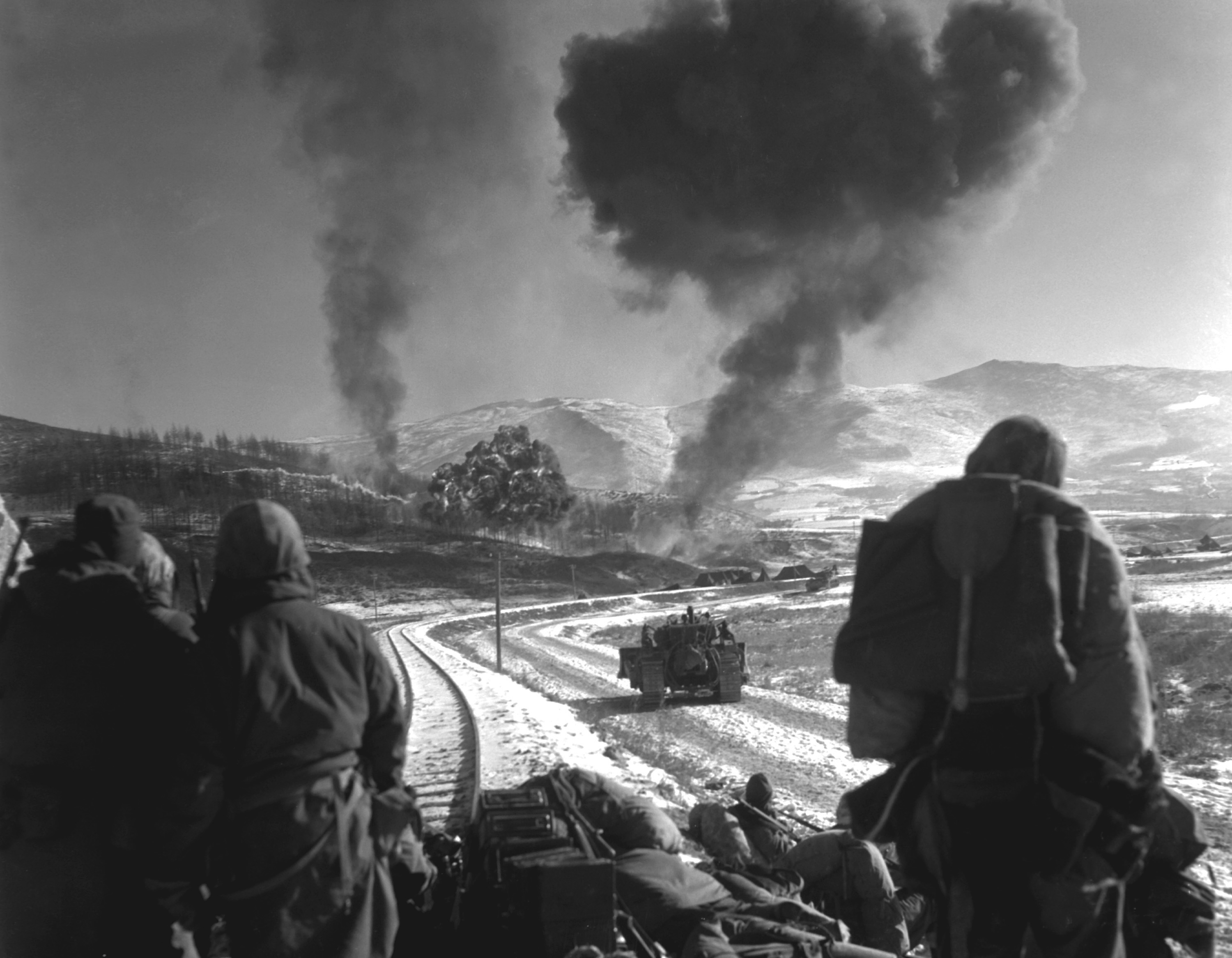
F4U Corsairs providing close air support to Marines of the 1st Marine Division fighting Chinese forces in North Korea, December 1950

The beginning of the Korean War (1950–1953) saw the hastily formed Provisional Marine Brigade holding the defensive line at the Pusan Perimeter. To execute a flanking maneuver, General Douglas MacArthur called on United Nations forces, spearheaded by U.S. Marines, to make an amphibious landing at Inchon. The successful landing resulted in the collapse of North Korean lines and the pursuit of North Korean forces north near the Yalu River until the surprise entrance of the People's Republic of China into the war which overwhelmed the overextended and outnumbered the United Nations forces. 1st Marine Division, which was attached to the U.S. Army's X Corps, regrouped and inflicted heavy casualties during its fighting withdrawal to the coast of Hungnam, known as the Battle of Chosin Reservoir.

After their evacuation from Hungnam, 1st Marine Division would go on to participate in some of the most important battles of the war until the signing of the armistice in 1953. These included the First and second battles of Wonju, Operation Ripper, Chinese spring offensive and UN May–June 1951 counteroffensive. 1st Marine Division played a central role in repelling the Chinese assault at the Battle of the Samichon River, the final battle of the war.

During the war, the Corps expanded from 75,000 regulars to a force of 261,000 Marines, mostly reservists; 30,544 Marines were killed or wounded during the war, and 42 were awarded the Medal of Honor.

=== Vietnam War ===
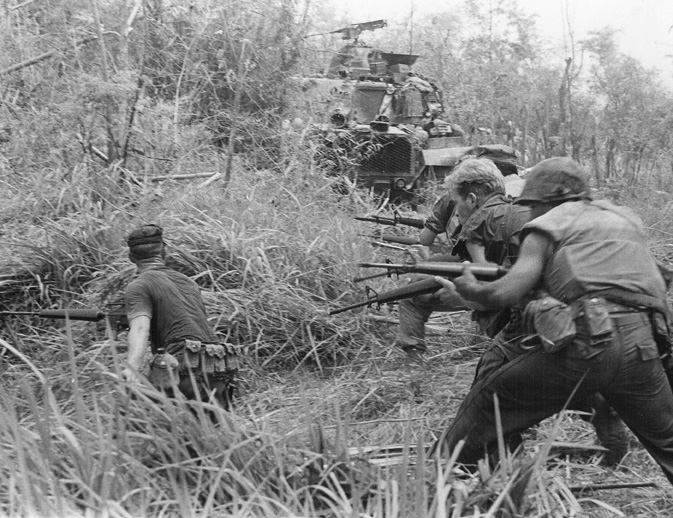
U.S. Marines of "G" Company, 2nd Battalion, 7th Marines in action during Operation Allen Brook in South Vietnam, 1968

The Marine Corps served in the Vietnam War, taking part in such battles as the Battle of Hue and the Battle of Khe Sanh in 1968. Individuals from the USMC generally operated in the Northern I Corps Regions of South Vietnam. While there, they were constantly engaged in a guerrilla war against the Viet Cong, along with an intermittent conventional war against the North Vietnamese Army, this made the Marine Corps known throughout Vietnam and gained a frightening reputation from the Viet Cong. Portions of the Corps were responsible for the less-known Combined Action Program that implemented unconventional techniques for counterinsurgency and worked as military advisors to the Republic of Vietnam Marine Corps. Marines were withdrawn in 1971 and returned briefly in 1975 to evacuate U.S. personnel and other civilians from Saigon and attempt a rescue of the crew of the SS Mayaguez. Vietnam was the longest war up to that time for the Marines; by its end, 13,091 had been killed in action, 51,392 had been wounded, and 57 Medals of Honor had been awarded. Because of policies concerning rotation, more marines were deployed for service during Vietnam than World War II.

While recovering from Vietnam, the Corps hit a detrimental low point in its service history caused by courts-martial and non-judicial punishments related partially to increased unauthorized absences and desertions during the war. Overhaul of the Corps began in the late 1970s, discharging the most delinquent, and once the quality of new recruits improved, the Corps focused on reforming the non-commissioned officer Corps, a vital functioning part of its forces.

=== Interim: Vietnam War to the war on terror ===
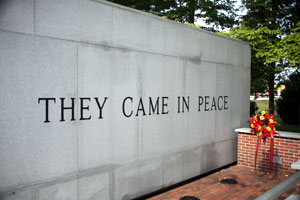
Beirut Memorial at Marine Corps Base Camp Lejeune

After the Vietnam War, the U.S. Marines resumed their expeditionary role, participating in the failed 1980 Iran hostage rescue attempt Operation Eagle Claw, the Operation Urgent Fury and the Operation Just Cause. On 23 October 1983, the Marine barracks in Beirut was bombed, causing the highest peacetime losses to the Corps in its history (220 Marines and 21 other service members were killed) and leading to the American withdrawal from Lebanon. In 1990, Marines of the Joint Task Force Sharp Edge saved thousands of lives by evacuating British, French and American nationals from the violence of the Liberian Civil War.

During the Persian Gulf War of 1990 to 1991, Marine task forces formed for Operation Desert Shield and later liberated Kuwait, along with Coalition forces, in Operation Desert Storm. In April 1992, U.S. marines supported Operation Hot Rock, assisting Italian authorities in efforts to divert lava flows from the erupting Mount Etna that threatened the town of Zafferana Etnea. Marines also participated in combat operations in Somalia (1992–1995) during Operation Continue Hope (formerly known as Restore Hope), and Operation United Shield to provide humanitarian relief. In 1997, marines took part in Operation Silver Wake, evacuating US citizens during the civil unrest in Albania and providing humanitarian assistance to Albanian citizens fleeing the country.

=== Global war on terrorism ===
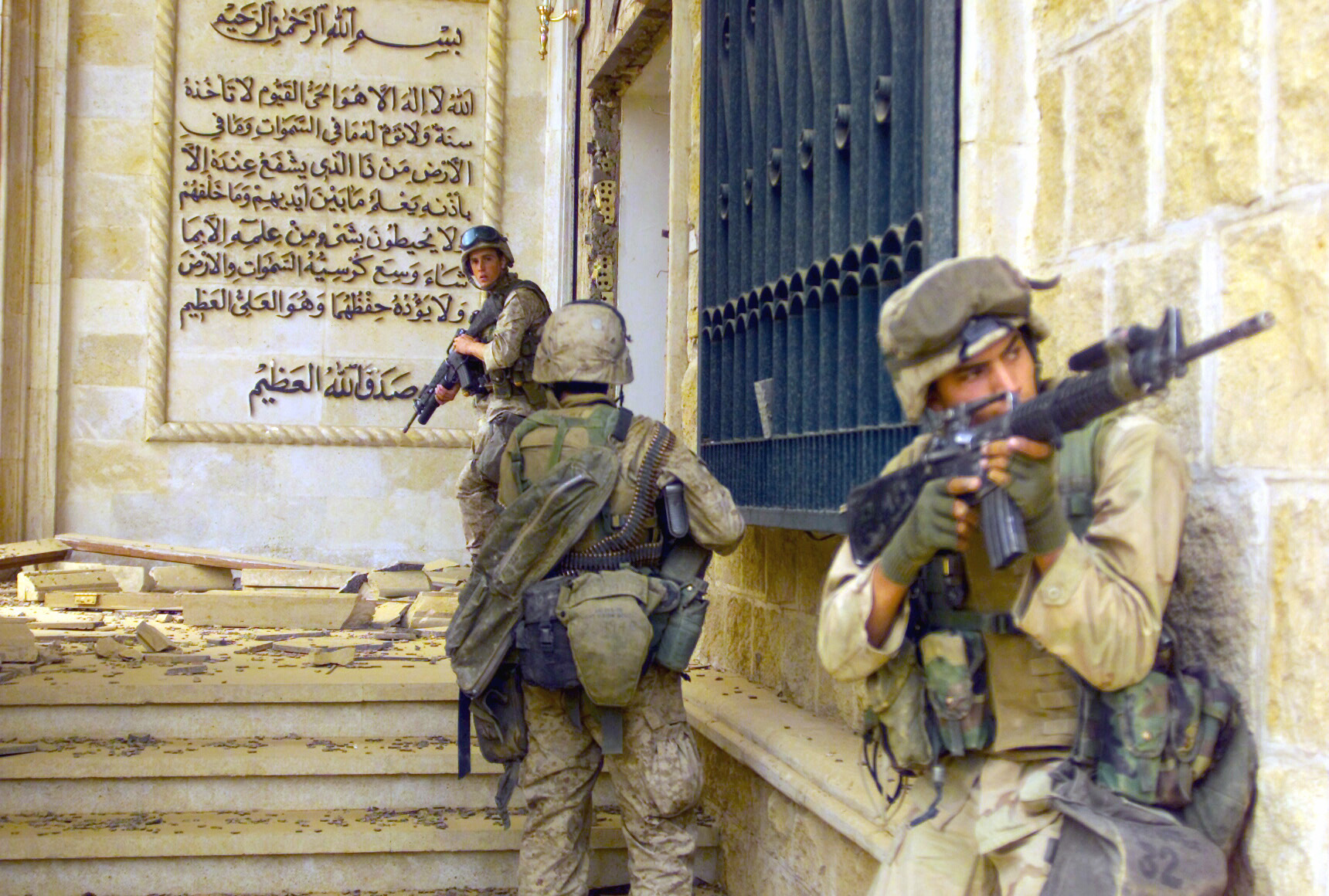
U.S. Marines from 1st Battalion, 7th Marines entering Saddam's Palace in Baghdad, 2003

Following the attacks on 11 September 2001, President George W. Bush announced the Global War on Terrorism. The stated objective of the Global War on Terror is "the defeat of Al-Qaeda, other terrorist groups and any nation that supports or harbors terrorists". Since then, the Marine Corps, alongside the other military services, has engaged in global operations around the world in support of that mission.

In spring 2009, President Barack Obama's goal of reducing spending in the Defense Department was led by Secretary Robert Gates in a series of budget cuts that did not significantly change the Corps's budget and programs, cutting only the VH-71 Kestrel and resetting the VXX program. However, the National Commission on Fiscal Responsibility and Reform singled the Corps out for the brunt of a series of recommended cuts in late 2010. In light of budget sequestration in 2013, General James Amos set a goal of a force of 174,000 marines. He testified that this was the minimum number that would allow for an effective response to even a single contingency operation, but it would reduce the peacetime ratio of time at home bases to time deployed down to a historical low level.

==== Afghanistan Campaign ====
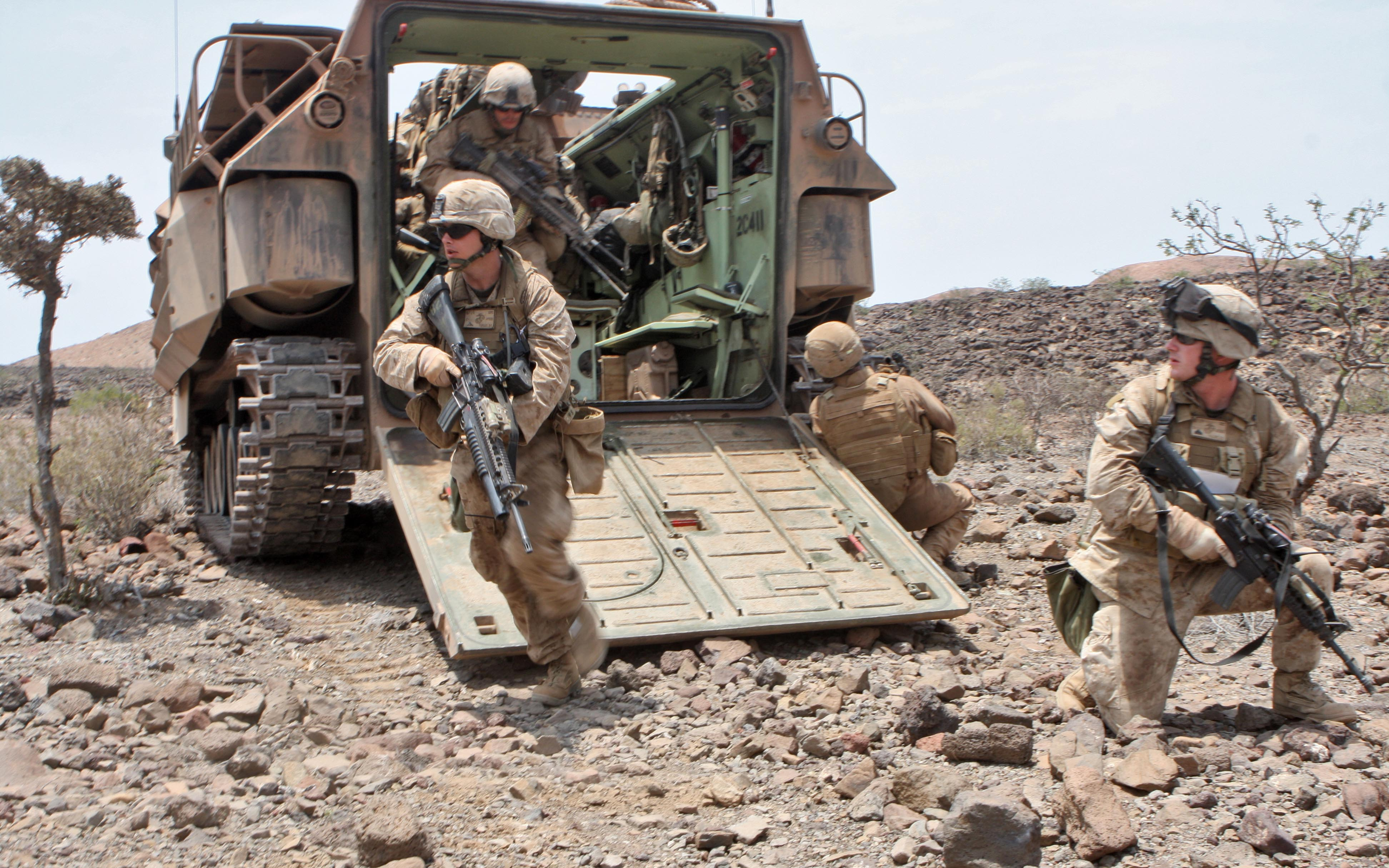
U.S. Marines dismounting from an Assault Amphibious Vehicle in Djibouti

Marines and other American forces began staging in Pakistan and Uzbekistan on the border of Afghanistan as early as October 2001 in preparation for Operation Enduring Freedom. The 15th and 26th Marine Expeditionary Units were some of the first conventional forces into Afghanistan in support of Operation Enduring Freedom in November 2001.

After that, Marine battalions and squadrons rotated through, engaging the Taliban and Al-Qaeda forces. Marines of the 24th Marine Expeditionary Unit flooded into the Taliban-held town of Garmsir in Helmand Province on 29 April 2008, in the first major American operation in the region in years. In June 2009, 7,000 marines with the 2nd Marine Expeditionary Brigade (2nd MEB) deployed to Afghanistan in an effort to improve security and began Operation Strike of the Sword the next month. In February 2010, the 2nd MEB launched the largest offensive of the Afghan Campaign since 2001, the Battle of Marjah, to clear the Taliban from their key stronghold in Helmand Province. After Marjah, marines progressed north up the Helmand River and cleared the towns of Kajahki and Sangin. Marines remained in Helmand Province until 2014.

==== Iraq Campaign ====
U.S. Marines during the Second Battle of Fallujah in 2004

U.S. Marines served in the Iraq War, along with its sister services. The I Marine Expeditionary Force, along with the U.S. Army's 3rd Infantry Division, spearheaded the 2003 invasion of Iraq. The Marines left Iraq in the summer of 2003 but returned in the beginning of 2004. They were given responsibility for the Al Anbar Province, the large desert region to the west of Baghdad. During this occupation, the Marines lead assaults on the city of Fallujah in April (Operation Vigilant Resolve) and November 2004 (Operation Phantom Fury) and saw intense fighting in such places as Ramadi, Al-Qa'im and Hīt. The service's time in Iraq courted controversy with events such as the Haditha killings and the Hamdania incident. The Anbar Awakening and 2007 surge reduced levels of violence. The Marine Corps officially ended its role in Iraq on 23 January 2010 when it handed over responsibility for Al Anbar Province to the U.S. Army. Marines returned to Iraq in the summer of 2014 in response to growing violence there.

==== Operations in Africa ====
Throughout the Global War on Terrorism, the U.S. Marines have supported operations in Africa to counter Islamic extremism and piracy in the Red Sea. In late 2002, Combined Joint Task Force – Horn of Africa was stood up at Camp Lemonnier, Djibouti to provide regional security. Despite transferring overall command to the Navy in 2006, the Marines continued to operate in the Horn of Africa into 2007.

=== Reshaped for China threat ===
In the 2020s, as the U.S. national strategy shifted from the war on terrorism to competition with China, the Marine Corps abandoned its previous plan to focus on land operations and strengthened its firepower configuration in the Indo-Pacific region to defeat the Chinese People's Liberation Army in possible island operations. As part of this shift the USMC has established a joint deployment with the Australian military in Darwin starting with 200 marines in 2011.

=== Domestic operations ===
In 1992, President George H.W Bush invoked the Insurrection Act and deployed 1,500 marines from the 3rd battalion, 1st Marine Division, 1st Light Armored Infantry Battalion (later redesignated the 1st Light Armored Reconnaissance Battalion) and 1st Combat Engineer Battalion to Los Angeles in response to violence and civil disorder during the 1992 Los Angeles Riots.

In 2025, President Donald Trump's administration deployed 700 marines with the 2nd Battalion, 7th Marines, and 1st Marine Division from Marine Corps Air Ground Combat Center Base near Twentynine Palms, California within the United States to Los Angeles to integrate with the Title 10 forces (Note: Title 10 forces are activated by and under the authority of the president; whereas, Title 32 activation is by a state's governor and the forces are under state control.) under Task Force 51 who are tasked with protecting federal personnel, such as Immigrations Customs Enforcement personnel, and federal property in the greater Los Angeles area after incidents of violence & civil disorder associated with protests against Immigrations Custom Enforcement (ICE) raids in Los Angeles.

== Organization ==
Organization of the United States Marine Corps within the Department of Defense

=== Department of the Navy ===
The Department of the Navy, led by the secretary of the Navy, is a military department of the cabinet-level U.S. Department of Defense that oversees the Marine Corps and the Navy. The most senior Marine Corps officer is the commandant (unless a Marine Corps officer is the chairman of the Joint Chiefs or vice chairman of the Joint Chiefs), responsible to the secretary of the Navy for organizing, recruiting, training, and equipping the Marine Corps so that its forces are ready for deployment under the operational command of the combatant commanders. The Marine Corps is organized into four principal subdivisions: Headquarters Marine Corps (HQMC), the Operating Forces, the Supporting Establishment, and the Marine Forces Reserve (MARFORRES or USMCR).

=== Headquarters Marine Corps ===
The Headquarters Marine Corps (HQMC) consists of the commandant of the Marine Corps, the assistant commandant of the Marine Corps, the director of the Marine Corps Staff, several deputy commandants, the sergeant major of the Marine Corps, and various special staff officers and Marine Corps agency heads that report directly to either the commandant or assistant commandant. HQMC is supported by the Headquarters and Service Battalion, USMC providing administrative, supply, logistics, training, and services support to the Commandant and his staff. Additionally, Marine Corps' aircraft arm and intelligence arm are both organized under HQMC; those being the Marine Corps Aviation and Marine Corps Intelligence respectively.

=== Operating Forces ===
The Operating Forces are divided into three categories: Marine Corps Forces (MARFOR) assigned to unified combatant commands, namely, the Fleet Marine Force (FMF) within each operating fleet; Security Forces guarding high-risk naval installations; and Security Guard detachments at U.S. embassies. Under the "Forces for Unified Commands" memo, in accordance with the Unified Command Plan, Marine Corps Forces are assigned to each of the combatant commands at the discretion of the secretary of defense. Since 1991, the Marine Corps has maintained component headquarters at each of the regional unified combatant commands.

Marine Corps forces are divided into United States Marine Corps Forces Command (MARFORCOM) and United States Marine Corps Forces, Pacific (MARFORPAC), each headed by a lieutenant general. They are dual-posted as the commanding general of either Fleet Marine Force, Atlantic (FMFLANT) or Fleet Marine Force, Pacific (FMFPAC), respectively. MARFORCOM/FMFLANT has operational control of the II Marine Expeditionary Force; MARFORPAC/FMFPAC has operational control of the I Marine Expeditionary Force and III Marine Expeditionary Force.

Additional service components under the Marine Corps Forces includes: the Marine Corps Forces Europe and Africa (MARFOREUR/AF) under U.S. European Command (EURCOM) and U.S. Africa Command (AFRICOM); the Marine Corps Forces Central Command (MARFORCENT) under U.S. Central Command (CENTCOM); the Marine Corps Forces South (MARFORSOUTH) under U.S. Southern Command (SOUTHCOM); the Marine Corps Forces Cyberspace Command (MARFORCYBER) under U.S. Cyber Command (CYBERCOM); the Marine Corps Forces Space Command (MARFORSPACE) under U.S. Space Command (SPACECOM); and the Marine Corps Forces Strategic Command (MARFORSTRAT) under U.S. Strategic Command (STRATCOM).

==== Marine Air-Ground Task Force ====
The basic framework for deployable Marine units is the Marine Air-Ground Task Force (MAGTF), a flexible structure of varying size. A MAGTF integrates a ground combat element (GCE), an aviation combat element (ACE), and a logistics combat element (LCE) under a common command element (CE), capable of operating independently or as part of a larger coalition. The MAGTF structure reflects a strong preference in the Corps toward self-sufficiency and a commitment to combined arms, both essential assets to an expeditionary force.

=== Supporting Establishment ===
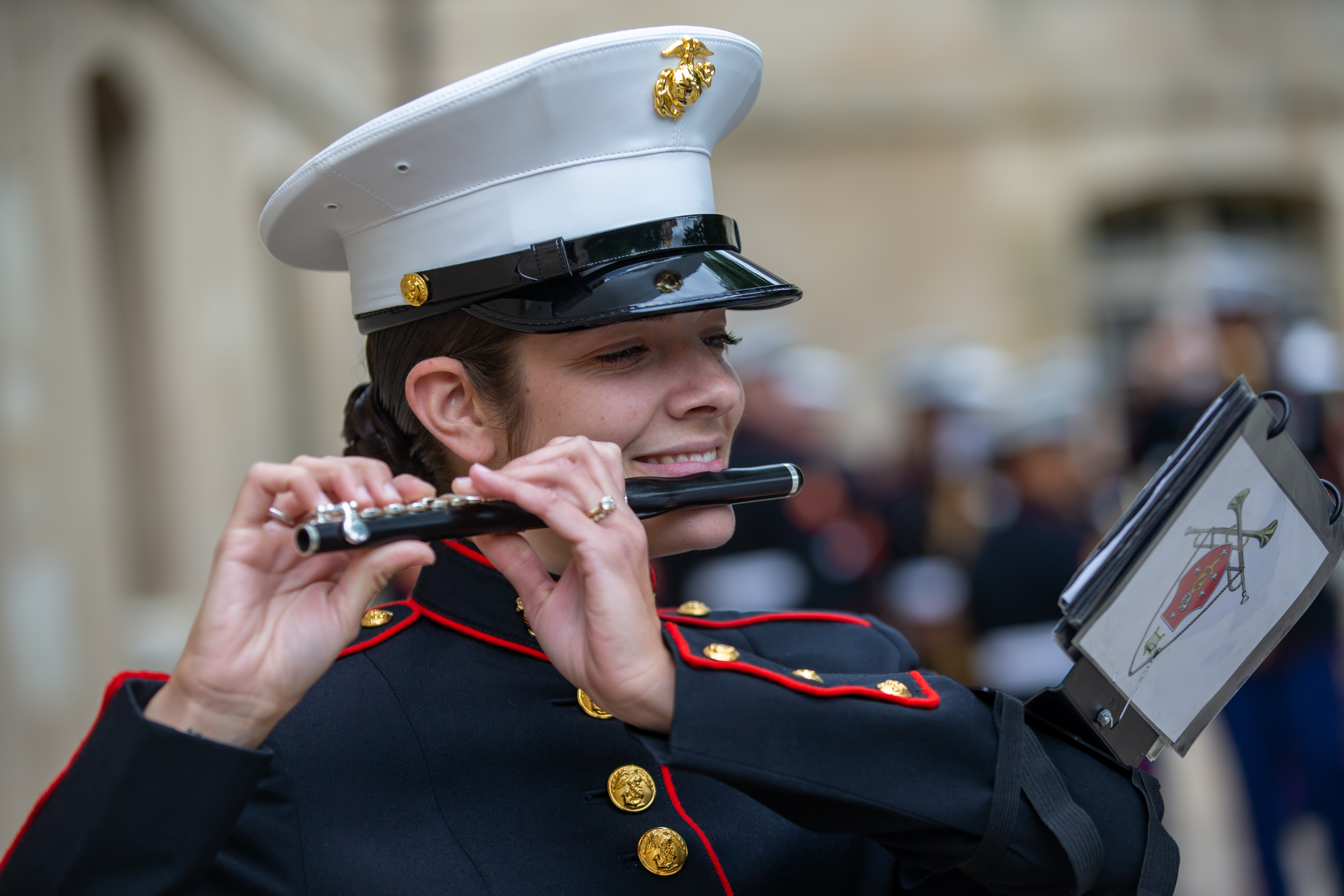
A member of the United States Marine Band playing at Les Invalides in Paris

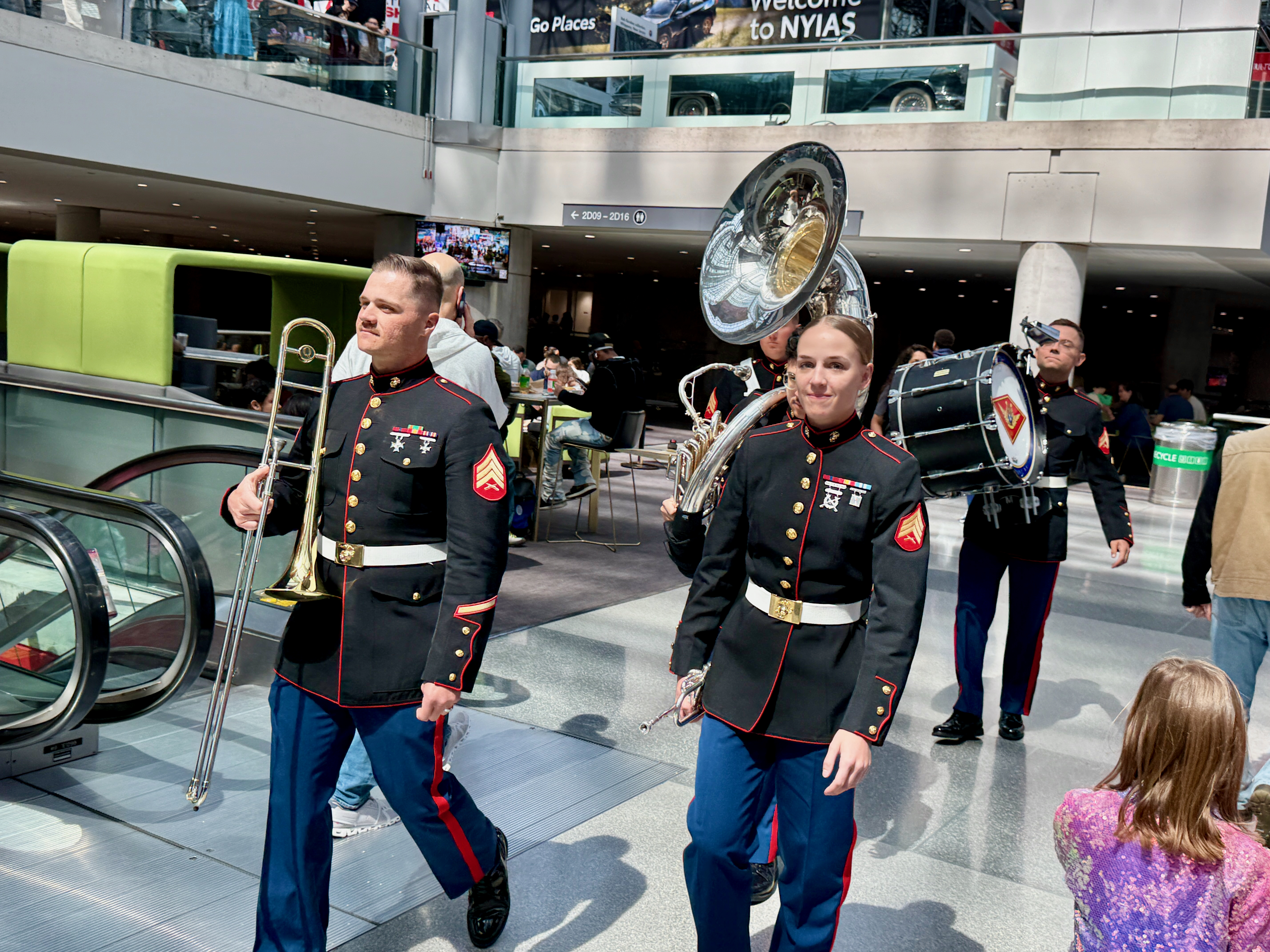
United States Marine Band at the New York Auto Show

The Supporting Establishment includes the Combat Development Command, the Logistics Command, the Systems Command, the Training and Education Command (including Recruiting Command), the Installations Command, the Marine Band, and the Marine Drum and Bugle Corps.

==== Marine Corps bases and stations ====
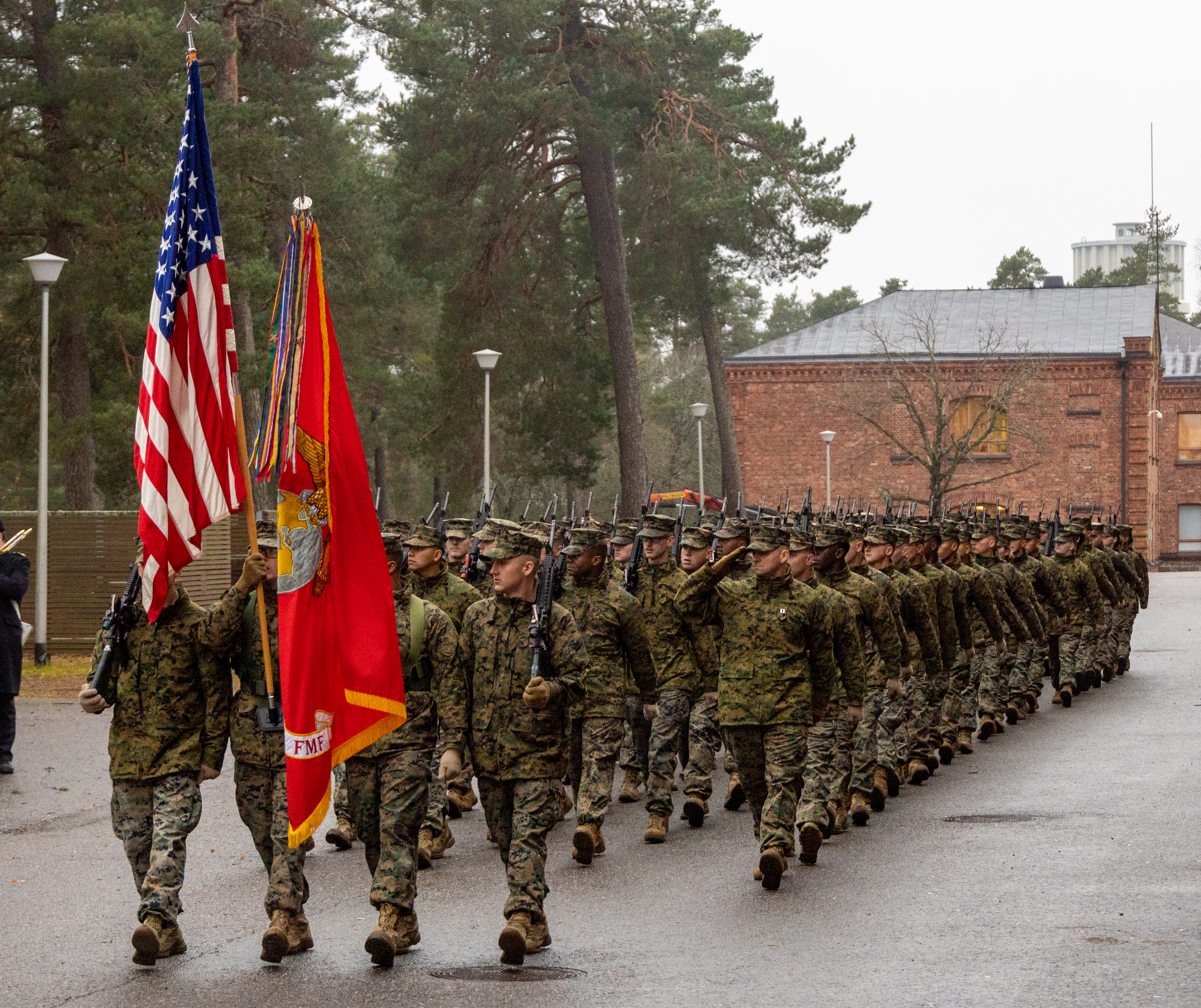
The Marine Corps extended the range of the training to Finland in connection with the DCA agreement. In the picture, marines participate in the Nyland Brigade's Swedish Heritage Parade in Dragsvik, Finland, on November 5, 2023.

The Marine Corps operates many major bases, 14 of which host operating forces, seven support and training installations, as well as satellite facilities. Marine Corps bases are concentrated around the locations of the Marine Expeditionary Forces, though reserve units are scattered throughout the U.S. The principal bases are Camp Pendleton on the West Coast, home to I Marine Expeditionary Force, Camp Lejeune on the East Coast, home to II Marine Expeditionary Force, and Camp Butler in Okinawa, Japan, home to III Marine Expeditionary Force.

Other important bases include air stations, recruit depots, logistics bases, and training commands. Marine Corps Air Ground Combat Center Twentynine Palms in California is the Marine Corps's largest base and home to the Corps's most complex combined-arms live-fire training. Marine Corps Base Quantico in Virginia is home to Marine Corps Combat Development Command and nicknamed the "Crossroads of the Marine Corps". The Marine Corps maintains a significant presence in the National Capital Region, with Headquarters Marine Corps scattered among the Pentagon, Henderson Hall, Washington Navy Yard, and Marine Barracks, Washington, D.C. Additionally, marines operate detachments at many installations owned by other branches to better share resources, such as specialty schools. Marines are also present at and operate many forward bases during expeditionary operations.

=== Marine Forces Reserve ===
The Marine Forces Reserve (MARFORRES/USMCR) consists of the Force Headquarters Group, 4th Marine Division, 4th Marine Aircraft Wing, and the 4th Marine Logistics Group. The MARFORRES/USMCR is capable of forming a 4th Marine Expeditionary Force or reinforcing/augmenting active-duty forces.

== Special operations ==
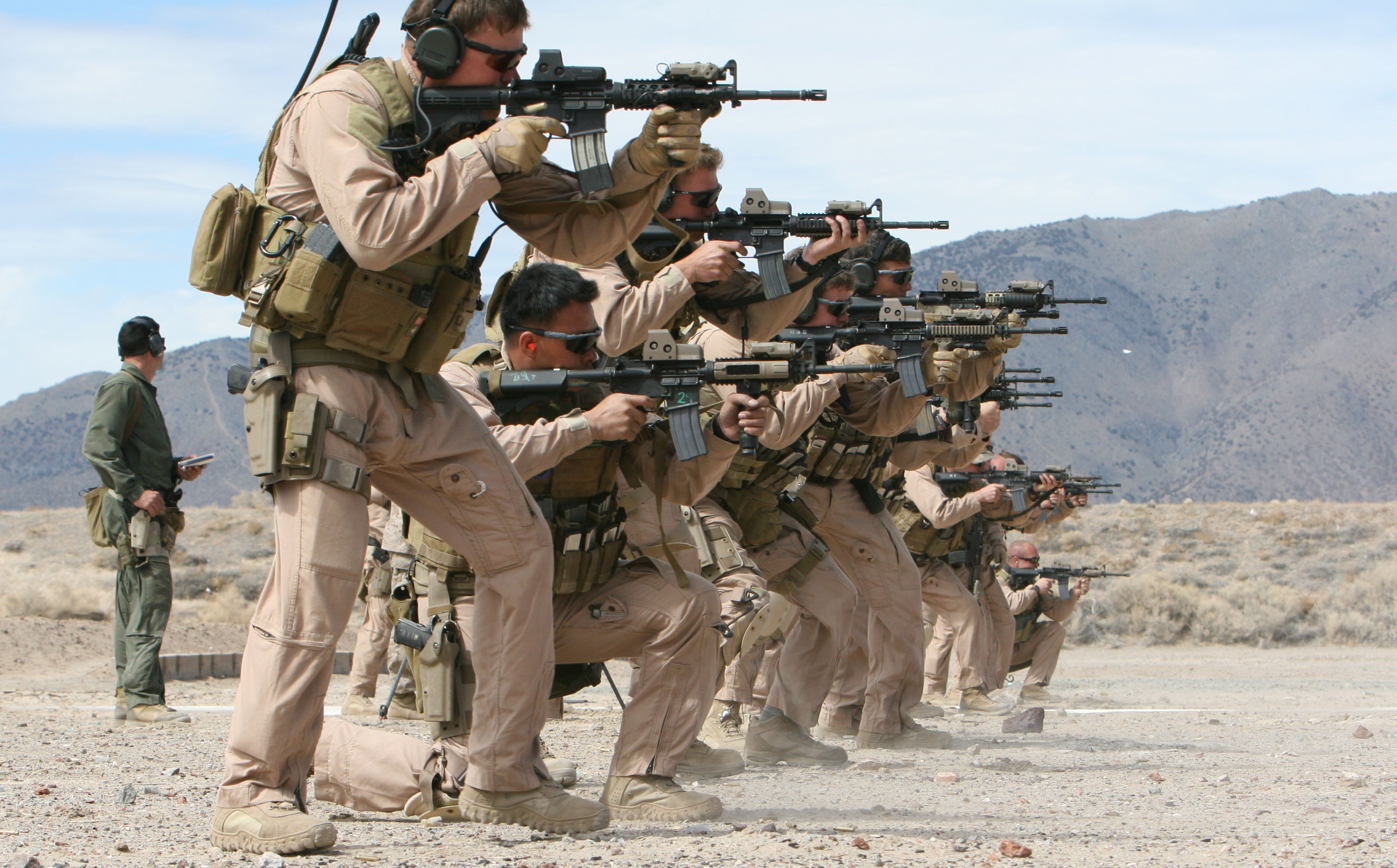
Marine raiders conducting shooting drills

The Marine Forces Special Operations Command (MARSOC) includes the Marine Raider Regiment, the Marine Raider Support Group, and the Marine Raider Training Center (MRTC). Both the Raider Regiment and the Raider Support Group consist of three battalions with a headquarters company. The MRTC conducts screening, assessment, selection, training and development functions for MARSOC units.

Although the notion of a Marine special operations forces contribution to the United States Special Operations Command (USSOCOM) was considered as early as the founding of USSOCOM in the 1980s, it was resisted by the Marine Corps. Commandant Paul X. Kelley expressed the belief that marines should only support marines and that the Marine Corps should not fund a special operations capability that would not directly support Marine Corps operations. However, much of the resistance from within the Marine Corps dissipated when Marine leaders watched the Marine Corps' 15th and 26th MEU(SOC)s "sit on the sidelines" during the very early stages of Operation Enduring Freedom while other conventional units and special operations units from the Army, Navy, and Air Force actively engaged in operations in Afghanistan. After a three-year development period, the Corps agreed in 2006 to supply a 2,500-strong unit, Marine Forces Special Operations Command, which would answer directly to USSOCOM.

Separate to the MARSOC, the 24th Marine Expeditionary Unit and the 26th Marine Expeditionary Unit both part of the II Marine Expeditionary Force are certified as "special operations capable" (MEU(SOC)).

Although the Marine Corps ground reconnaissance units, the Force Reconnaissance Companies and the Reconnaissance Battalions, are conventional forces and not special operations forces, they do share many of the same tactics, techniques, procedures, terms, and equipment.

== Personnel ==
=== Leadership ===
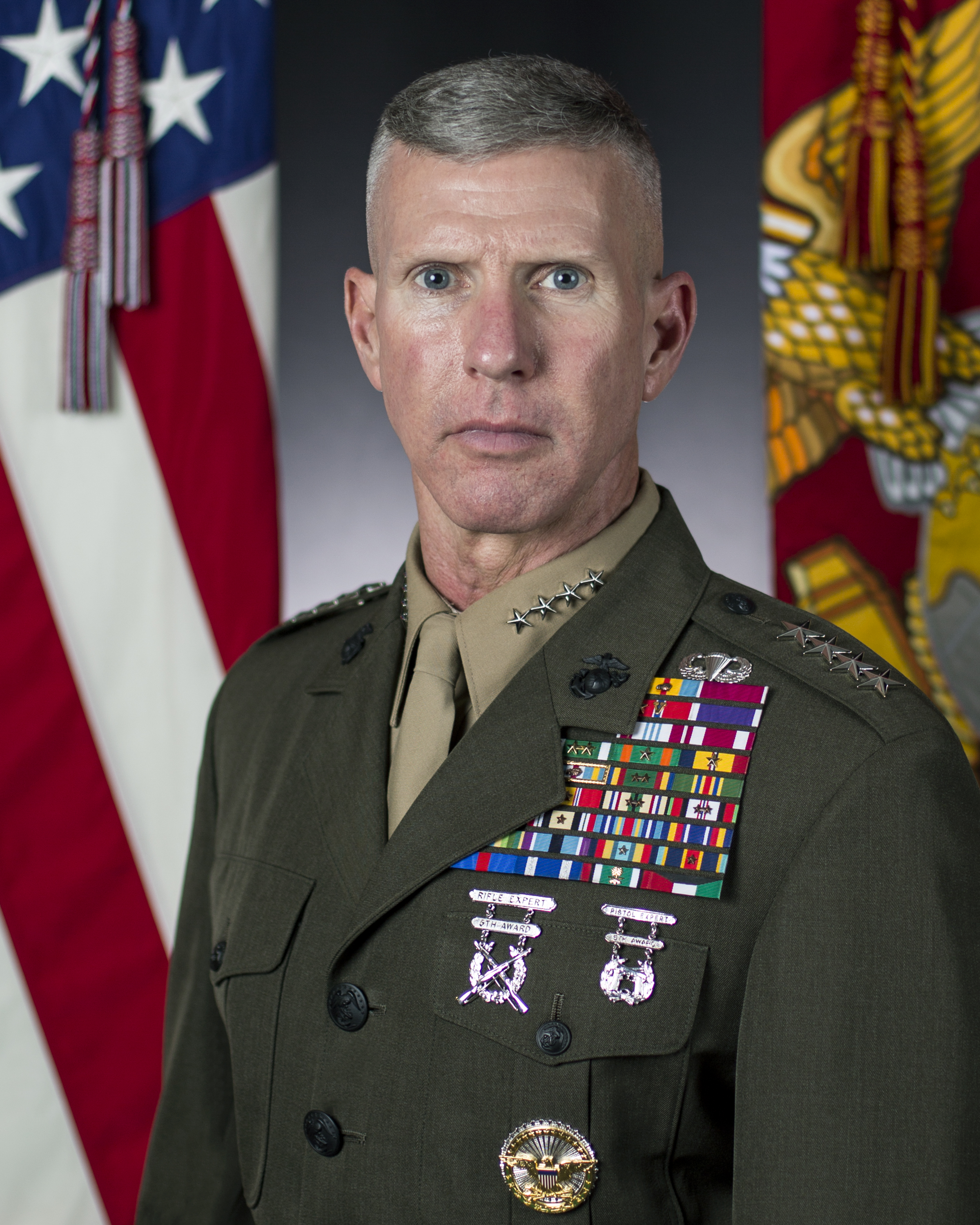
Eric M. Smith,
Commandant of the Marine Corps

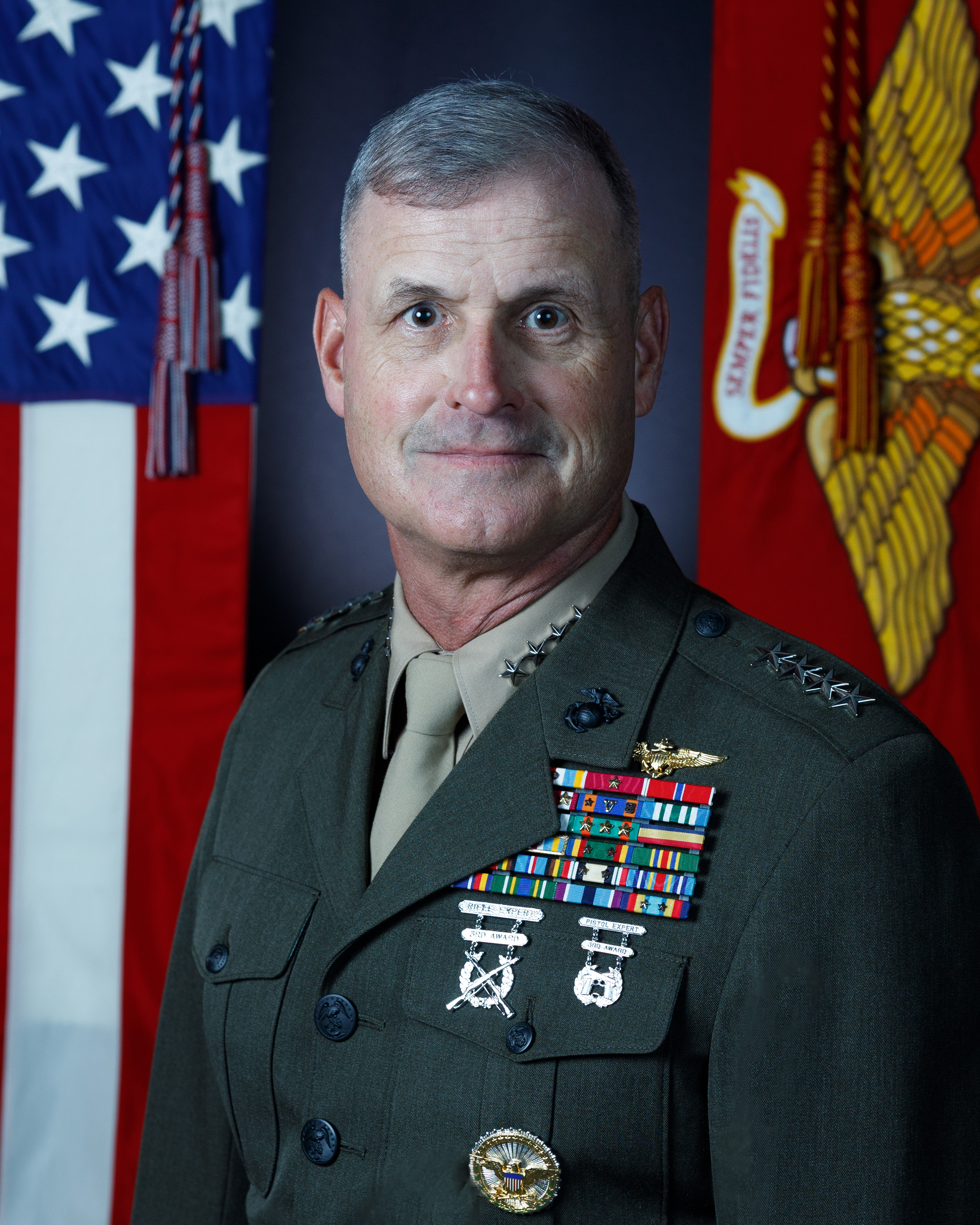
Bradford J. Gering,
Assistant Commandant of the Marine Corps

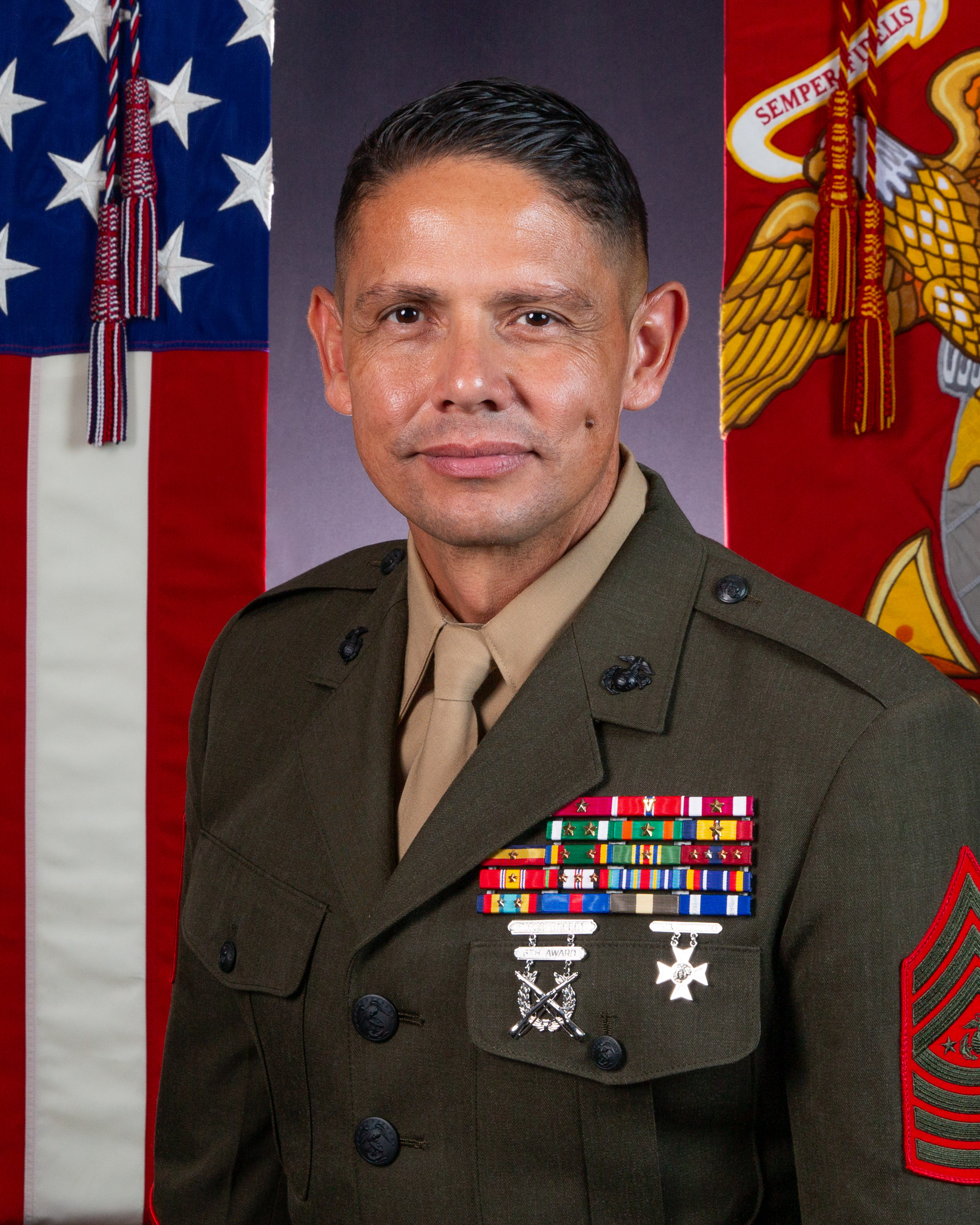
Carlos A. Ruiz,
Sergeant Major of the Marine Corps

The commandant of the Marine Corps is the highest-ranking officer of the Marine Corps, unless a marine is either the chairman or vice chairman of the Joint Chiefs of Staff. The commandant has the U.S. Code Title 10 responsibility to staff, train, and equip the Marine Corps and has no command authority. The commandant is a member of the Joint Chiefs of Staff and reports to the secretary of the Navy.

The assistant commandant of the Marine Corps acts as the chief deputy to the commandant. The sergeant major of the Marine Corps is the senior enlisted marine and acts as an adviser to the commandant. Headquarters Marine Corps comprises the rest of the commandant's counsel and staff, with deputy commandants that oversee various aspects of the Corps assets and capabilities. The 39th and current commandant is Eric M. Smith, while the 20th and current sergeant major is Carlos A. Ruiz.

=== Women ===
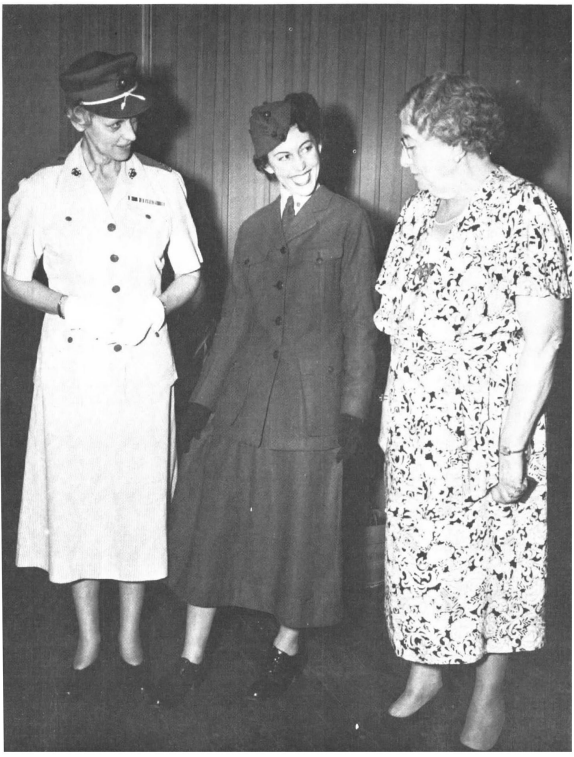
Sergeant Opha Johnson (far right) in 1946, with Colonel Katherine Towle (far left). They are looking at Opha Johnson's uniform being worn by PFC Muriel Albert.

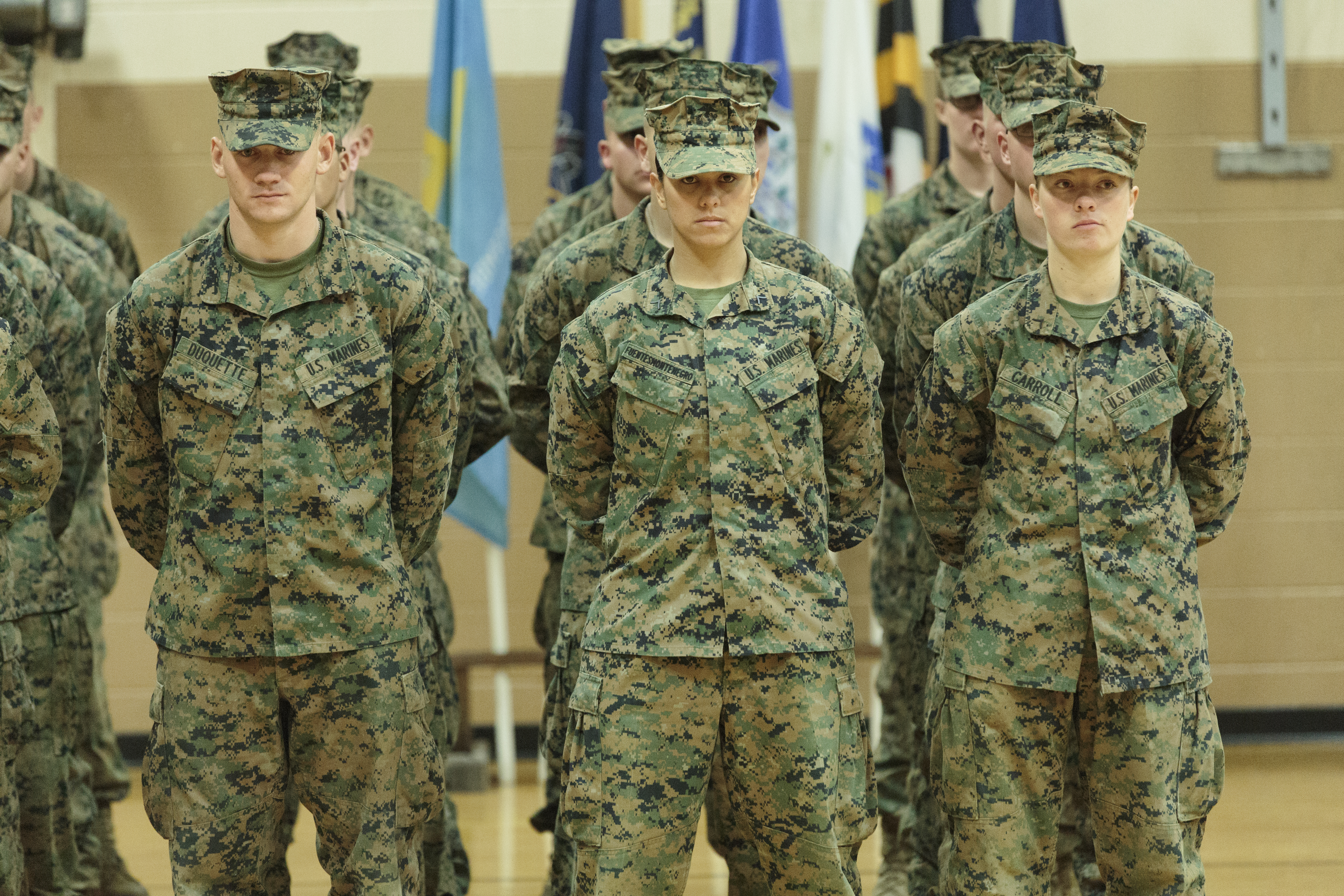
Two of the first female graduates of the School of Infantry-East's Infantry Training Battalion course, 2013

Women have served in the United States Marine Corps since 1918. The first woman to have enlisted was Opha May Johnson (1878–1955). In January 2017, three women joined an infantry battalion at Camp Lejeune. Women had not served as infantry marines prior to this. In 2017, the Marines released a recruitment advertisement that focused on women for the first time. As of October 2019, female marines make up 7.8% of the personnel.

In December 2020, the Marine Corps began a trial program to have female recruits integrated into the training companies at their recruit depot in San Diego as Congress has mandated an end to the male-only program there. For the 60 female recruits, scheduled to begin training in San Diego in February 2021, the Corps will transfer female drill instructors from their recruit depot in Parris Island, which already has a coed program. Fifty-three of these recruits successfully graduated from boot camp in April 2021 and became marines.

=== Racial integration ===
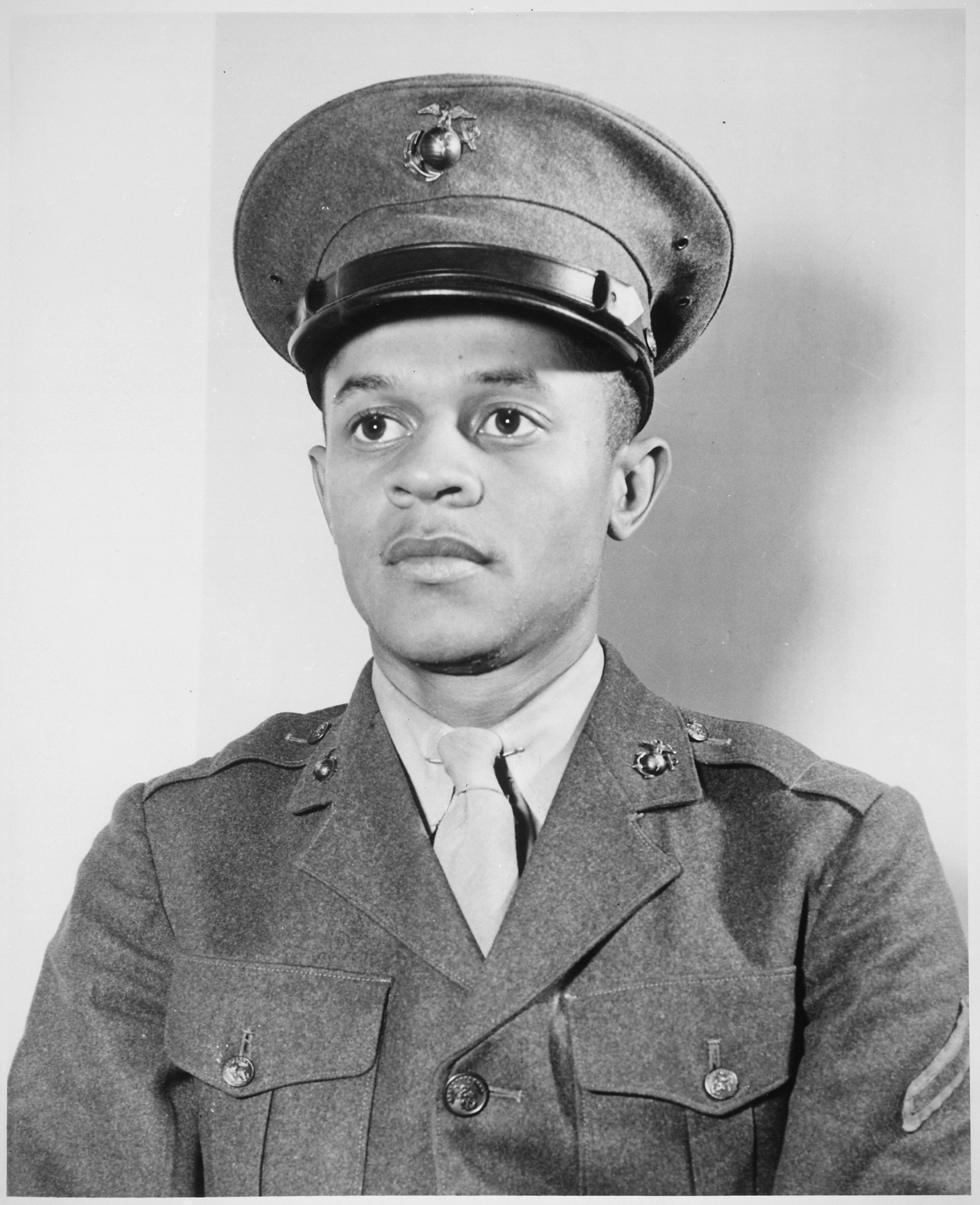
Howard P. Perry, the first black recruit in the U.S. Marine Corps, 1942.

In 1776 and 1777, a dozen African American marines served in the American Revolutionary War, but from 1798 to 1942, the Marine Corps followed a racially discriminatory policy of denying African Americans the opportunity to serve. The Marine Corps was the last of the services to recruit African Americans, and its own history page acknowledges that it was a presidential order that "forced the Corps, despite objections from its leadership, to begin recruiting African American marines in 1942." It accepted them as recruits into segregated all-black units. For the next few decades, the incorporation of black troops was not widely accepted within the Corps, nor was desegregation smoothly or quickly achieved. The integration of African American marines proceeded in stages from segregated battalions in 1942, to unified training in 1949, and finally full integration in 1960.

While racial segregation was in place, African American marines were trained at a separate training base than their white counterparts. African American marines were trained at Montford Point Camp. Twenty thousand African Americans were trained here from 1942 to 1949. In 1974, Montford Point was renamed Camp Gilbert H. Johnson, to honor one of the first Black marines, Sgt. Maj. Gilbert "Hashmark" Johnson.

=== Rank structure ===
As in the rest of the United States Armed Forces (excluding the U.S. Space Force, which does not currently appoint warrant officers), Marine Corps ranks fall into one of three categories: commissioned officer, warrant officer, and enlisted, in decreasing order of authority. To standardize compensation, each rank is assigned a pay grade.

==== Commissioned officers ====
Commissioned officers are distinguished from other officers by their commission, which is the formal written authority, issued in the name of the president of the United States, that confers the rank and authority of a Marine officer. Commissioned officers carry the "special trust and confidence" of the president of the United States. Marine Corps commissioned officers are promoted based on an "up or out" system in accordance with the Defense Officer Personnel Management Act of 1980.

US DoD pay grade	O-10	O-9	O-8	O-7	O-6	O-5	O-4	O-3	O-2	O-1
NATO code	OF-9	OF-8	OF-7	OF-6	OF-5	OF-4	OF-3	OF-2	OF-1
Insignia
Service uniform insignia
Blue dress uniform insignia
Title	General	Lieutenant general	Major general	Brigadier general	Colonel	Lieutenant colonel	Major	Captain	First lieutenant	Second lieutenant
Abbreviation	Gen	LtGen	MajGen	BGen	Col	LtCol	Maj	Capt	1stLt	2ndLt

==== Warrant officers ====
Warrant officers are primarily formerly enlisted experts in a specific specialized field and provide leadership generally only within that specialty.

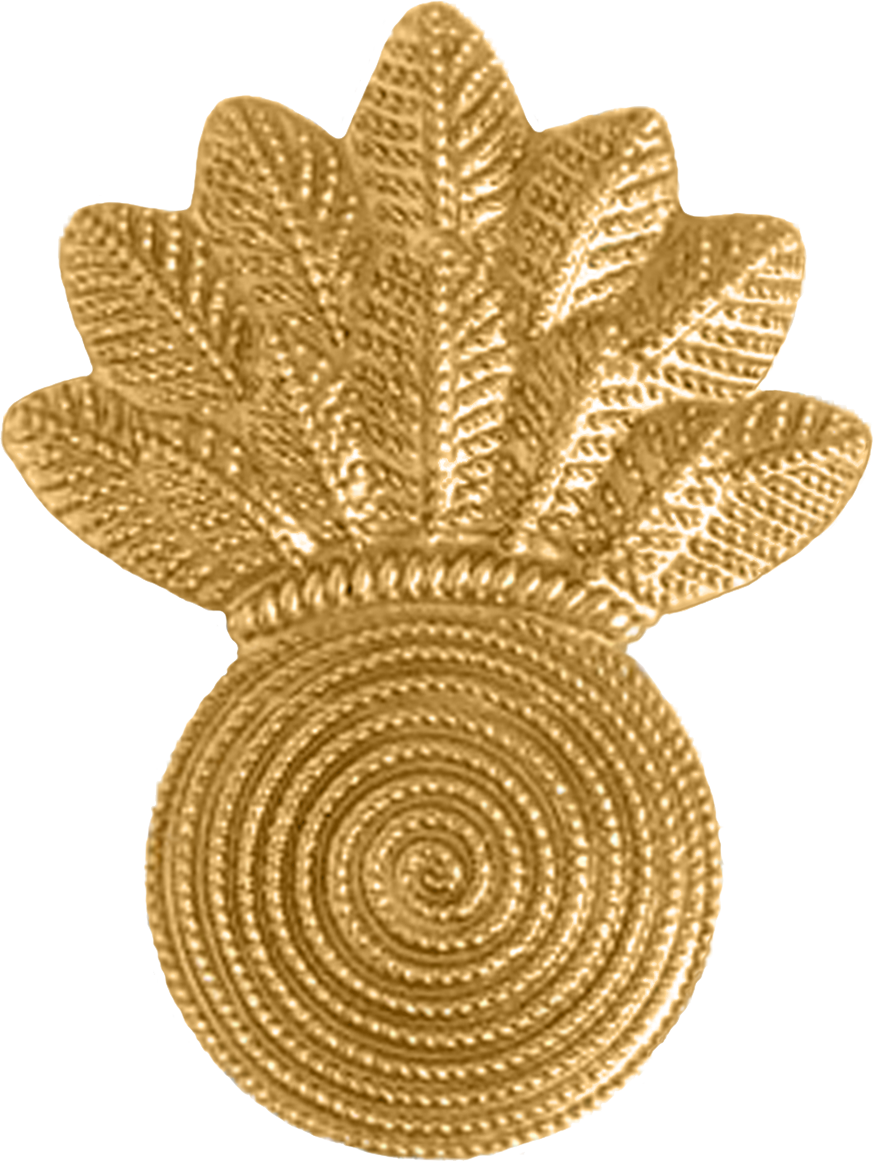
US DoD pay grade	Marine Gunner Insignia	W-5	W-4	W-3	W-2	W-1
NATO code	Marine Gunner Insignia	WO-5	WO-4	WO-3	WO-2	WO-1
Insignia
Service uniform insignia
Blue dress uniform insignia
Title		Chief warrant officer 5	Chief warrant officer 4	Chief warrant officer 3	Chief warrant officer 2	Warrant officer 1
Abbreviation		CWO5	CWO4	CWO3	CWO2	WO

==== Enlisted ====
Enlisted marines in the pay grades E-1 to E-3 make up the bulk of the Corps's ranks. Although they do not technically hold leadership ranks, the Corps's ethos stresses leadership among all marines, and junior marines are often assigned responsibilities normally reserved for superiors. Those in the pay grades of E-4 and E-5 are non-commissioned officers (NCOs). They primarily supervise junior marines and act as a vital link with the higher command structure, ensuring that orders are carried out correctly. Marines E-6 and higher are staff non-commissioned officers (SNCOs), charged with supervising NCOs and acting as enlisted advisers to the command.

The E-8 and E-9 levels have two and three ranks per pay grade, respectively, each with different responsibilities. The first sergeant and sergeant major ranks are command-oriented, serving as the senior enlisted marines in a unit, charged to assist the commanding officer in matters of discipline, administration, and the morale and welfare of the unit. Master sergeants and master gunnery sergeants provide technical leadership as occupational specialists in their specific MOS. The sergeant major of the Marine Corps is a billet conferred on the senior enlisted marine of the entire Marine Corps, personally selected by the commandant, and is given a special pay grade above E-9. It is possible for an enlisted marine to hold a position senior to the sergeant major of the Marine Corps which was the case when Sergeant Major Bryan B. Battaglia was appointed to the position of senior enlisted advisor to the chairman, who is the most senior enlisted member of the United States military, serving in the Joint Chiefs of Staff.

US DoD pay grade	E-9 Special (Note: SEAC and SMMC are within the E-9 pay grade but are given unique pay.)		E-9		E-8		E-7	E-6	E-5	E-4	E-3	E-2	E-1
NATO code	OR-9				OR-8		OR-7	OR-6	OR-5	OR-4	OR-3	OR-2	OR-1
Service uniform insignia													No insignia
Blue dress uniform insignia													No insignia
Title	Senior Enlisted Advisor to the Chairman	Sergeant Major of the Marine Corps	Sergeant major	Master gunnery sergeant	First sergeant	Master sergeant	Gunnery sergeant	Staff sergeant	Sergeant	Corporal	Lance corporal	Private first class	Private
Abbreviation	SEAC	SMMC	SgtMaj	MGySgt	1stSgt	MSgt	GySgt	SSgt	Sgt	Cpl	LCpl	PFC	Pvt

=== Military Occupational Specialty ===
The Military Occupational Specialty (MOS) is a system of job classification. Using a four digit code, it designates what field and specific occupation a marine performs. Segregated between officer and enlisted, the MOS determines the staffing of a unit. Some MOSs change with rank to reflect supervisory positions; others are secondary and represent a temporary assignment outside of a marine's normal duties or special skill.

=== Initial training ===
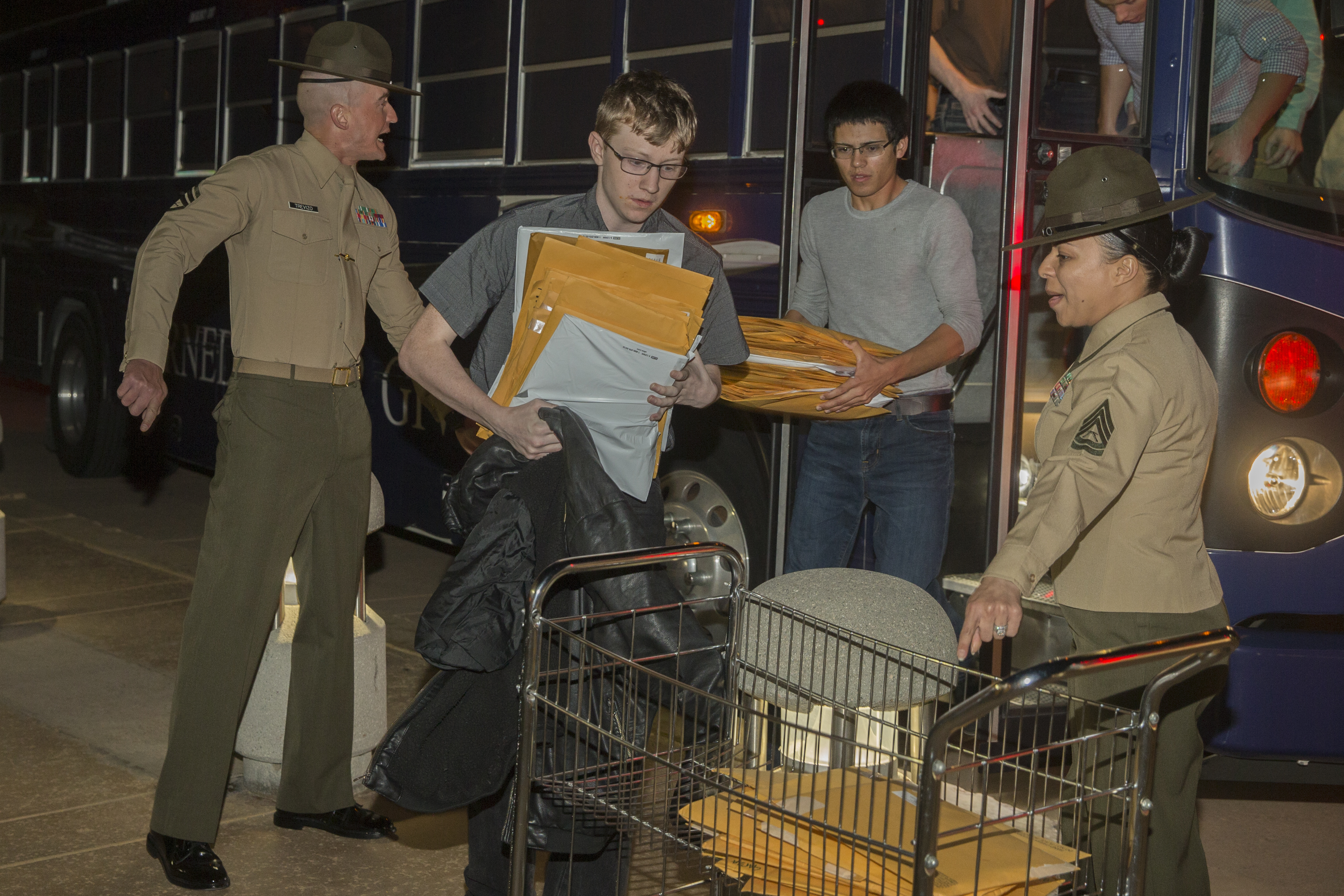
Marine recruits at Marine Corps Recruit Depot San Diego

Every year, over 2,000 new Marine officers are commissioned, and 38,000 recruits are accepted and trained. All new marines, enlisted or officer, are recruited by the Marine Corps Recruiting Command.

Commissioned officers are commissioned mainly through one of three sources: Naval Reserve Officer Training Corps, Officer Candidates School, or the United States Naval Academy. Following commissioning, all Marine commissioned officers, regardless of accession route or further training requirements, attend The Basic School at Marine Corps Base Quantico. At The Basic School, second lieutenants, warrant officers, and selected foreign officers learn the art of infantry and combined arms warfare.

Enlisted marines attend recruit training, known as boot camp, at either Marine Corps Recruit Depot San Diego or Marine Corps Recruit Depot Parris Island. Historically, the Mississippi River served as a dividing line that delineated who would be trained where, while more recently, a district system has ensured a more even distribution of male recruits between the two facilities. All recruits must pass a fitness test to start training; those who fail will receive individualized attention and training until the minimum standards are reached. Marine recruit training is the longest among the American military services; it is 13 weeks long including processing and out-processing.

Following recruit training, enlisted marines then attend the School of Infantry at Camp Geiger or Camp Pendleton. Infantry marines begin their combat training, which varies in length, immediately with the Infantry Training Battalion. Marines in all other MOSs train for 29 days in Marine Combat Training, learning common infantry skills, before continuing on to their MOS schools, which vary in length.

== Uniforms ==
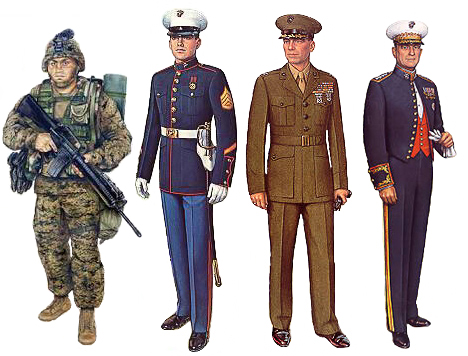
An illustration of U.S. marines in various uniform setups. From left to right: A U.S. marine in a Marine Corps Combat Utility Uniform with full combat load c. 2003, a U.S. marine in a (full) blue dress uniform, a U.S. Marine Corps officer in a service uniform, and a Corps general in an evening dress uniform.

The Marine Corps has the most stable and most recognizable uniforms in the American military; the Dress Blues dates back to the early 19th century and the service uniform to the early 20th century. Only a handful of skills (parachutist, air crew, explosive ordnance disposal, etc.) warrant distinguishing badges, and rank insignia is not worn on uniform headgear (with the exception of an officer's garrison service cover).

Marines have four main uniforms: dress, service, utility, and physical training. These uniforms have a few minor but very distinct variations from enlisted personnel to commissioned and non-commissioned officers. The Marine Corps dress uniform is the most elaborate, worn for formal or ceremonial occasions. There are four different forms of the dress uniform. The variations of the dress uniforms are known as "Alphas", "Bravos", "Charlies", or "Deltas". The most common being the "Blue Dress Alphas or Bravos", called "Dress Blues" or simply "Blues". It is most often seen in recruiting advertisements and is equivalent to black tie. There is a "Blue-White" Dress for summer, and Evening Dress for formal (white tie) occasions, which are reserved for SNCO's and officers. Versions with a khaki shirt in lieu of the coat (Blue Dress Charlie/Delta) are worn as a daily working uniform by Marine recruiters and NROTC staff.

The utility uniform, currently the Marine Corps Combat Utility Uniform, is a camouflage uniform intended for wear in the field or for dirty work in garrison, though it has been standardized for regular duty. It is rendered in MARPAT pixelated camouflage that breaks up the wearer's shape. Marines consider the utilities a working uniform and do not permit their wear off-base, except in transit to and from their place of duty and in the event of an emergency.

== Culture ==
=== Official traditions and customs ===
As in any military organization, the official and unofficial traditions of the Marine Corps serve to reinforce camaraderie and set the service apart from others. The Corps's embrace of its rich culture and history is cited as a reason for its high esprit de corps. An important part of the Marine Corps culture is the traditional seafaring naval terminology derived from its history with the Navy. "Marines" are not "soldiers" or "sailors".

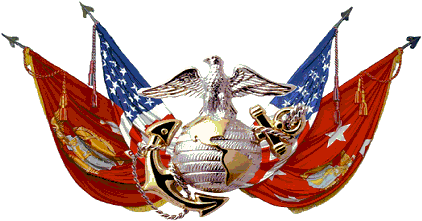
The Eagle, Globe and Anchor along with the U.S. flag, the Marine Corps flag and the Commandant's flag

The Marine Corps emblem is the Eagle, Globe, and Anchor, sometimes abbreviated "EGA", adopted in 1868. The Marine Corps seal includes the emblem, is found on the flag of the United States Marine Corps, and establishes scarlet and gold as the official colors. The Marine motto Semper Fidelis means Always Faithful in Latin, often appearing as Semper Fi. The "Marines' Hymn" dates back to the 19th century and is the oldest official song in the United States armed forces. Semper Fi is also the name of the official march of the Corps, composed by John Philip Sousa. The mottos "Fortitudine" (With Fortitude); By Sea and by Land, a translation of the Royal Marines' Per Mare, Per Terram; and To the Shores of Tripoli were used until 1868.

Semper Fidelis March
John Philip Sousa's "Semper Fidelis March", the official march of the U.S. Marine Corps. Performed by the U.S. Marine Band in June 1909.

Two styles of swords are worn by marines: the officers' Mameluke Sword, similar to the Persian shamshir presented to Lt. Presley O'Bannon after the Battle of Derna, and the Marine NCO sword. The Marine Corps Birthday is celebrated every year on 10 November in a cake-cutting ceremony where the first slice of cake is given to the oldest marine present, who in turn hands it off to the youngest marine present. The celebration includes a reading of Commandant Lejeune's Birthday Message. Close Order Drill is heavily emphasized early on in a marine's initial training, incorporated into most formal events, and is used to teach discipline by instilling habits of precision and automatic response to orders, increase the confidence of junior officers and noncommissioned officers through the exercise of command and give marines an opportunity to handle individual weapons.

Challenge Coins

One well-known tradition of the United States Marine Corps is presenting challenge coins to individual marines. A challenge coin is a commemorative coin that varies in size and appearance. Although their origins are widely disputed, they are presented to marines with notable accomplishments, special achievements, acts of service, and affiliations with specific organizations or units. Challenge coins are usually presented to the active-duty marine by commanders or senior leaders. The challenge coins serve as reminders of honor, appreciation, and recognition.

=== Unofficial traditions and customs ===
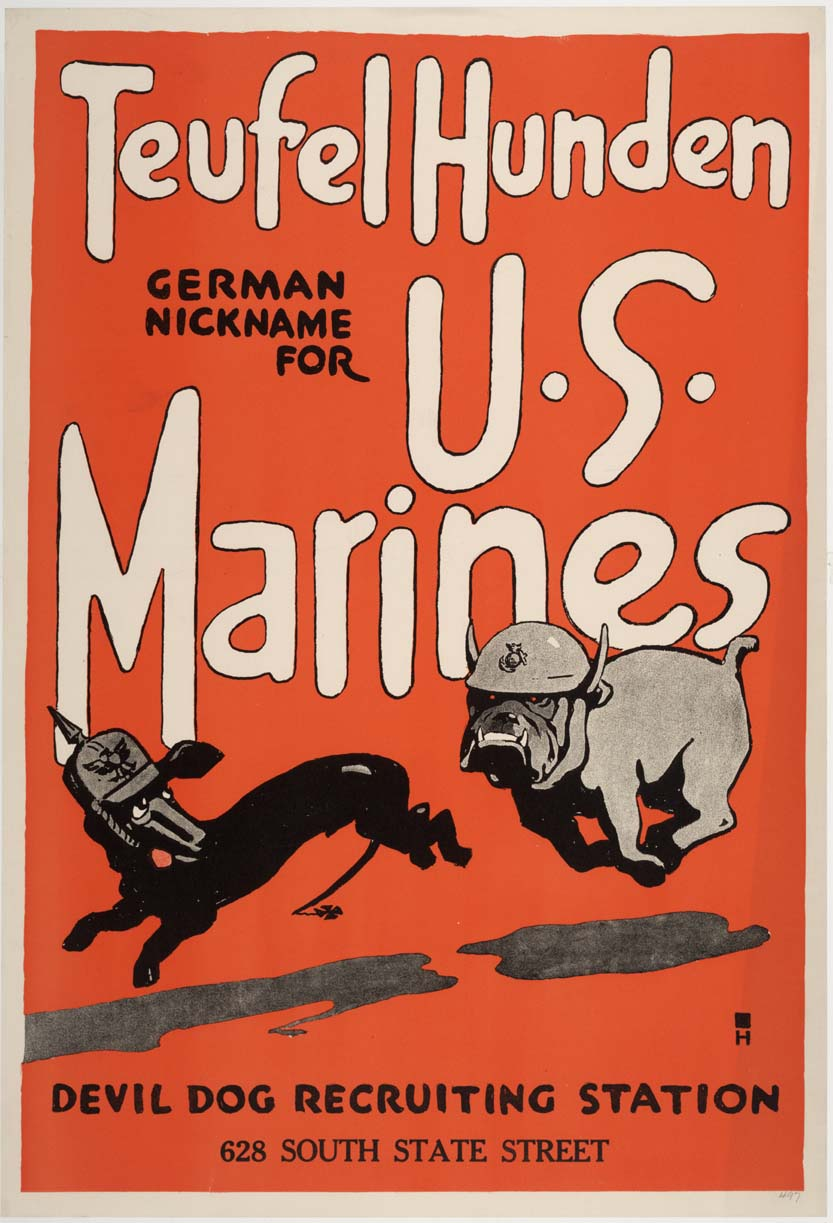
A recruiting poster making use of the "Teufel Hunden" [sic] nickname

Marines have several generic nicknames:

- Devil Dog: Marine Corps lore holds that German soldiers nicknamed U.S. marines "Teufelshunde" (Devil Dogs) at Belleau Wood. Although there is no evidence of German use or origin of the term, "Devil Dog" has remained a part of the culture of the Marine Corps.
- Gyrene: commonly used between fellow marines.
- Leatherneck: refers to a leather collar formerly part of the Marine uniform during the Revolutionary War period.
- Jarhead has several oft-disputed explanations.

Some other unofficial traditions include mottos and exclamations:

- Oorah is common among marines, being similar in function and purpose to the Army, Air Force, and Space Force's hooah and the Navy's hooyah cries. Many possible etymologies have been offered for the term.
- Semper Fi is a common greeting among serving and veteran marines.
- Improvise, Adapt and Overcome has become an adopted mantra in many units.

=== Negative associations ===
In 1976 the Camp Pendleton Chapter of the Ku Klux Klan, which had over 100 members, was headed by an active duty Marine. In 1986, a number of marines were implicated in the theft of weapons for the White Patriot Party. While the sale of the weapons was to a supremacist organization it was never verified that the marines were actual members of the organization. The USMC, along with the rest of the military, has since made an effort to address extremism in the ranks.

=== Veteran marines ===
The Marine Corps encourages the idea that "Marine" is an earned title, and Marine Corps personnel take to heart the phrase "Once a Marine, always a Marine." This phrase reflects the long-standing tradition that recognizes marines as marines due to the continued bond between marines who have left active duty and those who continue to serve. The term "ex-Marine" is discouraged in most circumstances.There are no regulations concerning the address of people who have left active service, so several customary terms have come into common use.

=== Martial arts program ===
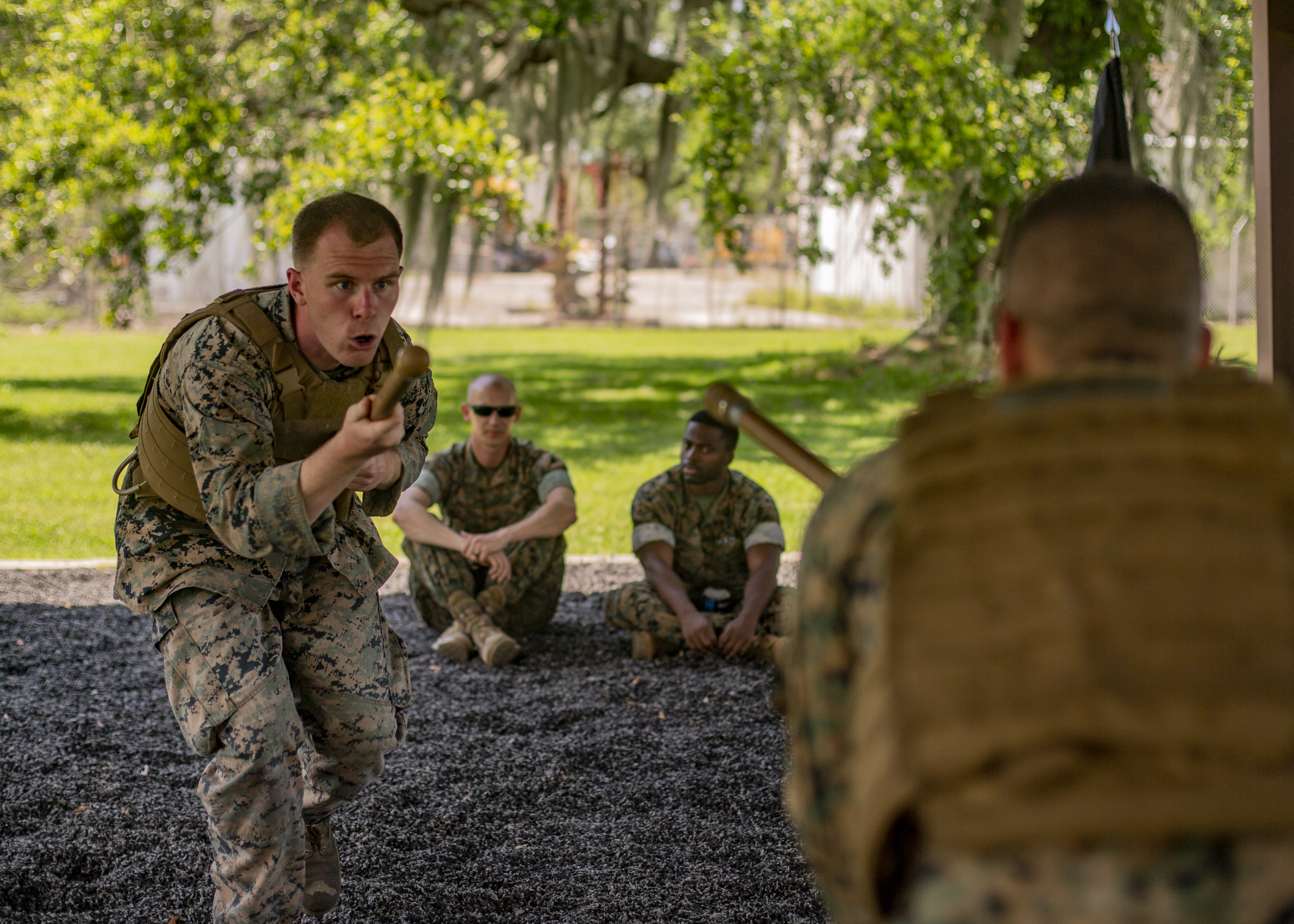
Marines training in martial arts

In 2001, the Marine Corps initiated an internally designed martial arts program, called Marine Corps Martial Arts Program (MCMAP). Because of an expectation that urban and police-type peacekeeping missions would become more common in the 21st century, placing marines in even closer contact with unarmed civilians, MCMAP was implemented to provide marines with a larger and more versatile set of less-than-lethal options for controlling hostile, unarmed individuals. It is a stated aim of the program to instill and maintain the "Warrior Ethos" within marines.

MCMAP is an eclectic mix of different styles of martial arts melded together. This program consists of punches and kicks from Taekwondo and Karate, opponent weight transfer from Jujitsu, ground grappling involving joint locking techniques and chokes from Brazilian jiu-jitsu, and a mix of knife and baton/stick fighting derived from Eskrima, and elbow strikes and kick boxing from Muay Thai. marines begin MCMAP training in boot camp, where they will earn the first of five available belts. The belts begin at tan and progress to black and are worn with standard utility uniforms.

== Equipment ==
As of 2013, the typical infantry rifleman carries $14,000 worth of gear (excluding night-vision goggles), compared to $2,500 a decade earlier. The number of pieces of equipment (everything from radios to trucks) in a typical infantry battalion has also increased, from 3,400 pieces of gear in 2001 to 8,500 in 2013.

=== Infantry weapons ===
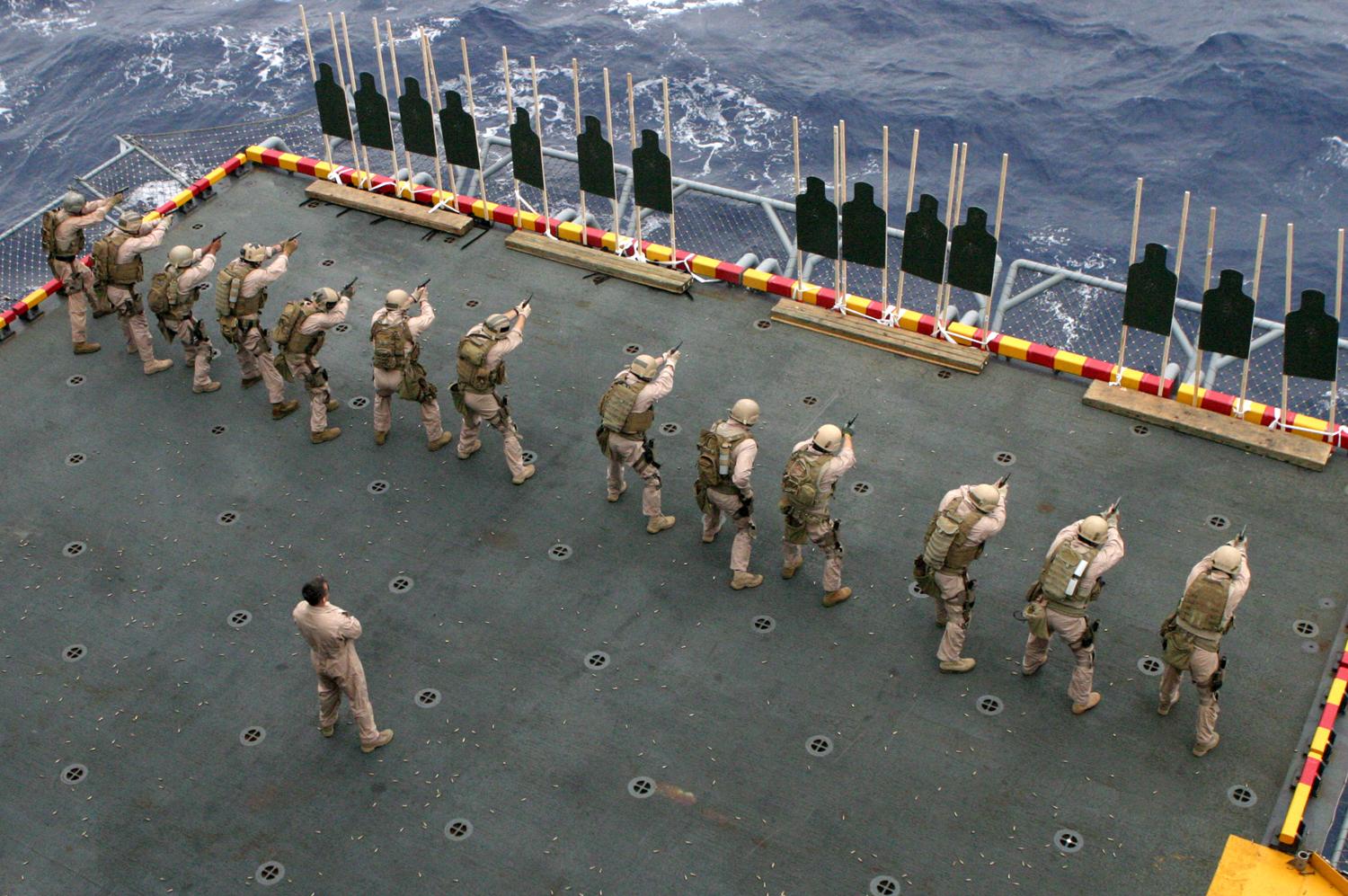
Marines firing MEU(SOC) pistols while garrisoned aboard a ship

The infantry weapon of the Marine Corps is the M27 IAR service rifle. Most non-infantry marines have been equipped with the M4 carbine or Colt 9mm SMG as of 2006. The standard side arm is the SIG Sauer M17/M18 The M18 will replace all other pistols in the Marine Corps inventory, including the M9, M9A1, M45A1 and M007, as the M45A1 Close Quarter Battle Pistol (CQBP) in small numbers. Suppressive fire is provided by the, M249 SAW, and M240 machine guns, at the squad and company levels respectively. In 2018, the M27 IAR was selected to be the standard-issue rifle for all infantry squads. In 2021, the Marine Corps committed to fielding suppressors to all its infantry units, making it the first branch of the U.S. military to adopt them for widespread use.

The USMC infantry issued grenade launcher is the M320, which shoots a 40 mm grenade. Indirect fire is also provided by the M203 grenade launcher and the M32 grenade launcher in fireteams, M224 60 mm mortar in companies, and M252 81 mm mortar in battalions. The M2 .50 caliber heavy machine gun and MK19 automatic grenade launcher (40 mm) are available for use by dismounted infantry, though they are more commonly vehicle-mounted. Precision firepower is provided by the M40 series and the Barrett M107, while designated marksmen use the DMR variant of the M27, known as the M38, and the SAM-R.

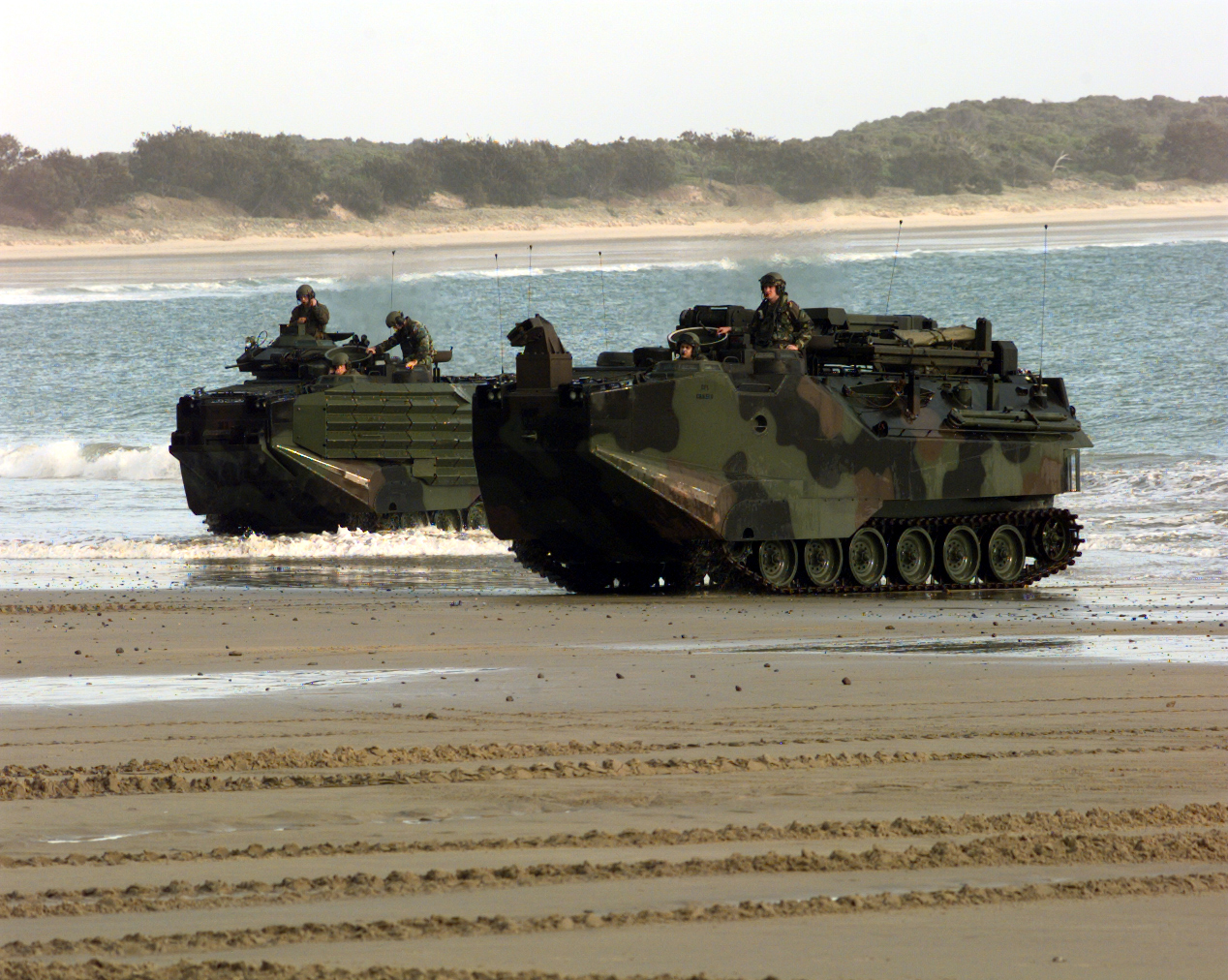
Marine Amphibious Assault Vehicles emerge from the surf onto the sand of Freshwater Beach, Australia

The Marine Corps uses a variety of direct-fire rockets and missiles to provide infantry with an offensive and defensive anti-armor capability. The Mk 153 SMAW and AT4 are unguided rockets that can destroy armor and fixed defenses (e.g., bunkers) at ranges up to 500 meters. The smaller and lighter M72 LAW can destroy targets at ranges up to 200 meters. The FGM-172 SRAW, FGM-148 Javelin and BGM-71 TOW are anti-tank guided missiles. The Javelin can use top-attack profiles to avoid heavy frontal armor. The SRAW is a close range missile system that uses a Predicted Line of Sight (PLOS) guidance system. The Javelin and TOW are heavier missiles effective past 2,000 meters that give infantry an offensive capability against armor.

=== Ground vehicles ===
The Corps operates the same HMMWV as does the Army, which is in the process of being replaced by the Joint Light Tactical Vehicle (JLTV). However, for its specific needs, the Corps uses a number of unique vehicles. The LAV-25 is a dedicated wheeled armored personnel carrier, similar to the Army's Stryker vehicle, used to provide strategic mobility. Amphibious capability is provided by the AAV-7A1 Assault Amphibious Vehicle, an armored tracked vehicle that doubles as an armored personnel carrier, due to be replaced by the Amphibious Combat Vehicle, a faster vehicle with superior armor and weaponry. The threat of land mines and improvised explosive devices in Iraq and Afghanistan has seen the Corps begin purchasing heavily armored vehicles that can better withstand the effects of these weapons as part of the Mine Resistant Ambush Protected vehicle program.

The Marines also operate the M777 155 mm howitzer and the High Mobility Artillery Rocket System (HIMARS), a truck-mounted rocket artillery system. Both are capable of firing guided munitions. In 2020, the Marine Corps retired its M1A1 Abrams tanks and eliminated all of its tank units. General David Berger explained the decision describing the long-serving Marine weapons system as "operationally unsuitable for our highest-priority challenges." The move leaves the Army as the sole American operator of tanks.

=== Aircraft ===
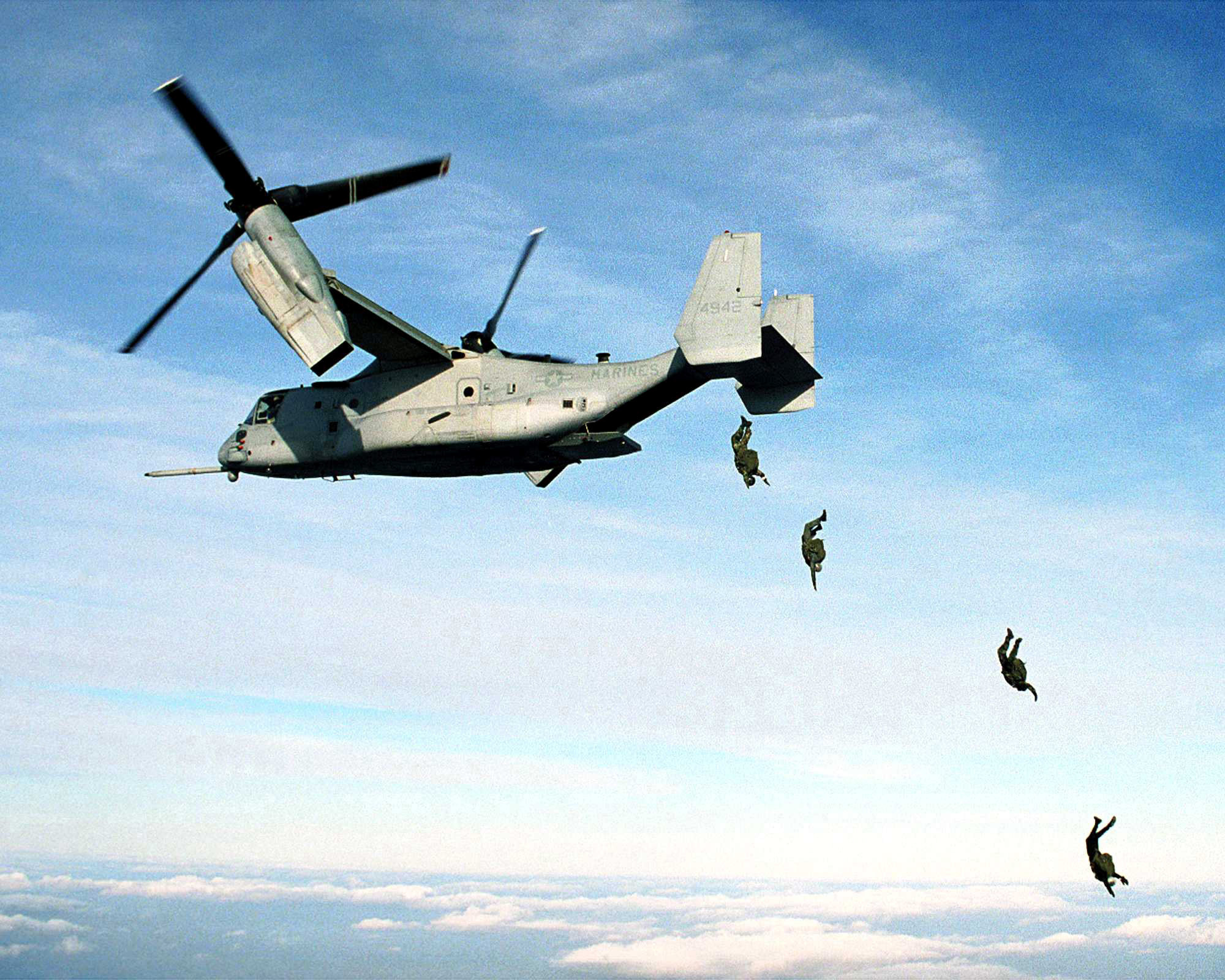
Marine parachutists jumping from an MV-22 Osprey at 10,000 feet

The organic aviation capability of the Marine Corps is essential to its amphibious mission. Marine Corps Aviation operates both rotary-wing and fixed-wing aircraft mainly to provide Assault Support and close air support to its ground forces. Other aircraft types are used in a variety of support and special-purpose roles. The light transport and attack capabilities are provided by the Bell UH-1Y Venom and Bell AH-1Z Viper. Medium-lift squadrons use the MV-22 Osprey tiltrotor. Heavy-lift squadrons are equipped with the CH-53E Super Stallion helicopter, which are being replaced with the upgraded CH-53K.

Marine attack squadrons flew the AV-8B Harrier II until it was retired in 2026. The fighter/attack mission is handled by the single-seat and dual-seat versions of the F/A-18 Hornet strike-fighter aircraft. The AV-8B is a V/STOL aircraft that can operate from amphibious assault ships, land air bases and short, expeditionary airfields, while the F/A-18 can only be flown from land or aircraft carriers. Both are slated to be replaced by 340 of the STOVL B version of the F-35 Lightning II and 80 of the carrier F-35C versions for deployment with Navy carrier air wings.

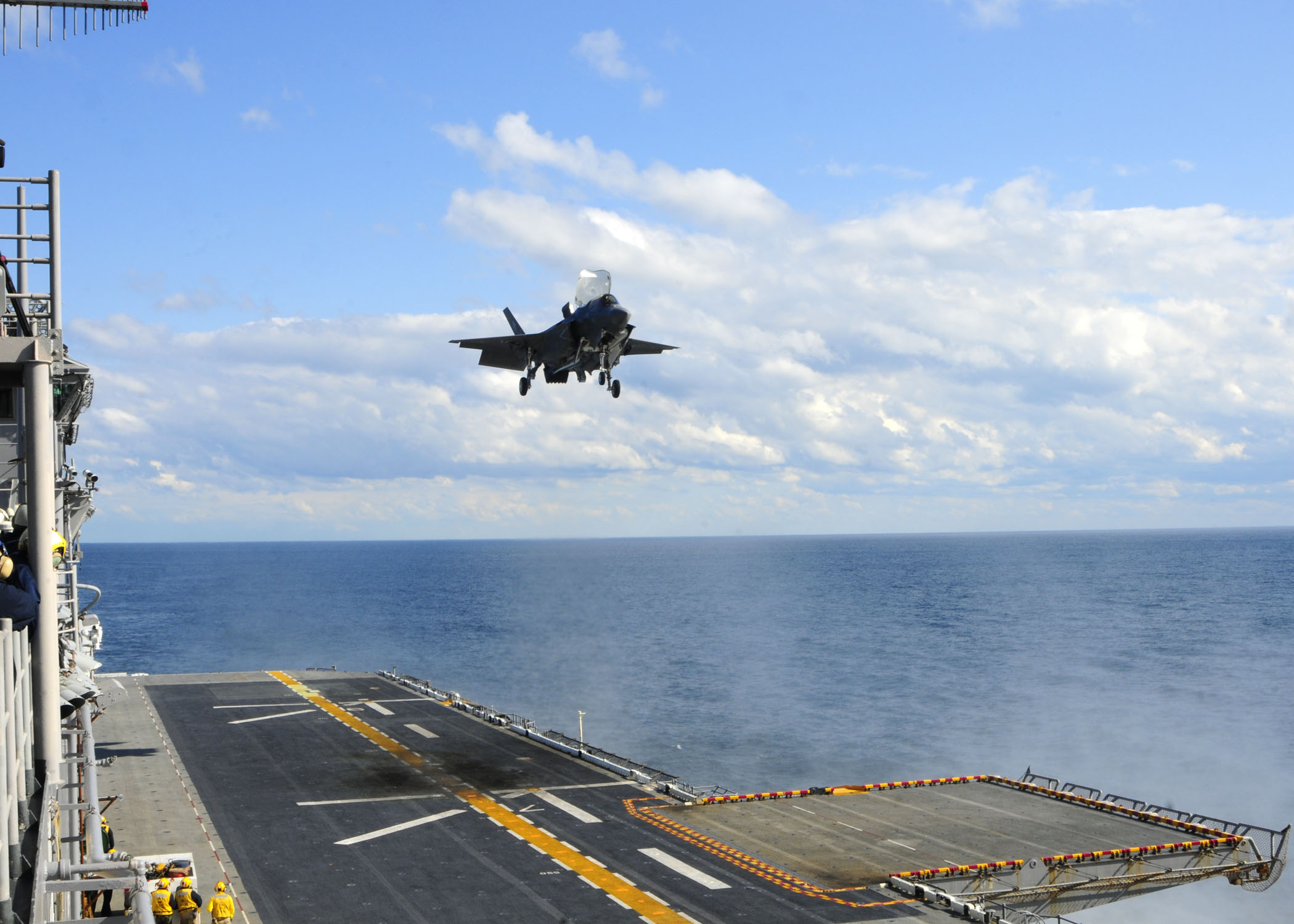
A Marine Corps F-35B, the vertical-landing version of the F-35 Lightning II multirole fighter landing aboard USS Wasp

The Corps operates its own organic aerial refueling assets in the form of the KC-130 Hercules; however, it also receives a large amount of support from the U.S. Air Force. The Hercules doubles as a ground refueler and tactical-airlift transport aircraft. The USMC electronic warfare plane, the EA-6B, was retired in 2019. The Marines operate unmanned aerial vehicles: the RQ-7 Shadow and Scan Eagle for tactical reconnaissance.

Marine Fighter Training Squadron 401 (VMFT-401), operates F-5E, F-5F and F-5N Tiger II aircraft in support of air combat adversary (aggressor) training. Marine Helicopter Squadron One (HMX-1) operates the VH-3D Sea King and VH-60N Whitehawk helicopters in the VIP transport role, most notably Marine One, but are due to be replaced with the VH-92 Patriot. A single Marine Corps C-130 Hercules aircraft, "Fat Albert", is used to support the U.S. Navy's flight demonstration team, the "Blue Angels".

== Relationship with other services ==
In general, the Marine Corps shares many resources with the other branches of the United States Armed Forces. However, the Corps has consistently sought to maintain its own identity with regard to mission, funding, and assets, while using support available from the larger branches. While the Marine Corps has far fewer installations both in the U.S. and worldwide than the other branches, many Army posts, Naval stations, and Air Force bases have a Marine presence. They also cross-train with other countries.

=== United States Navy ===
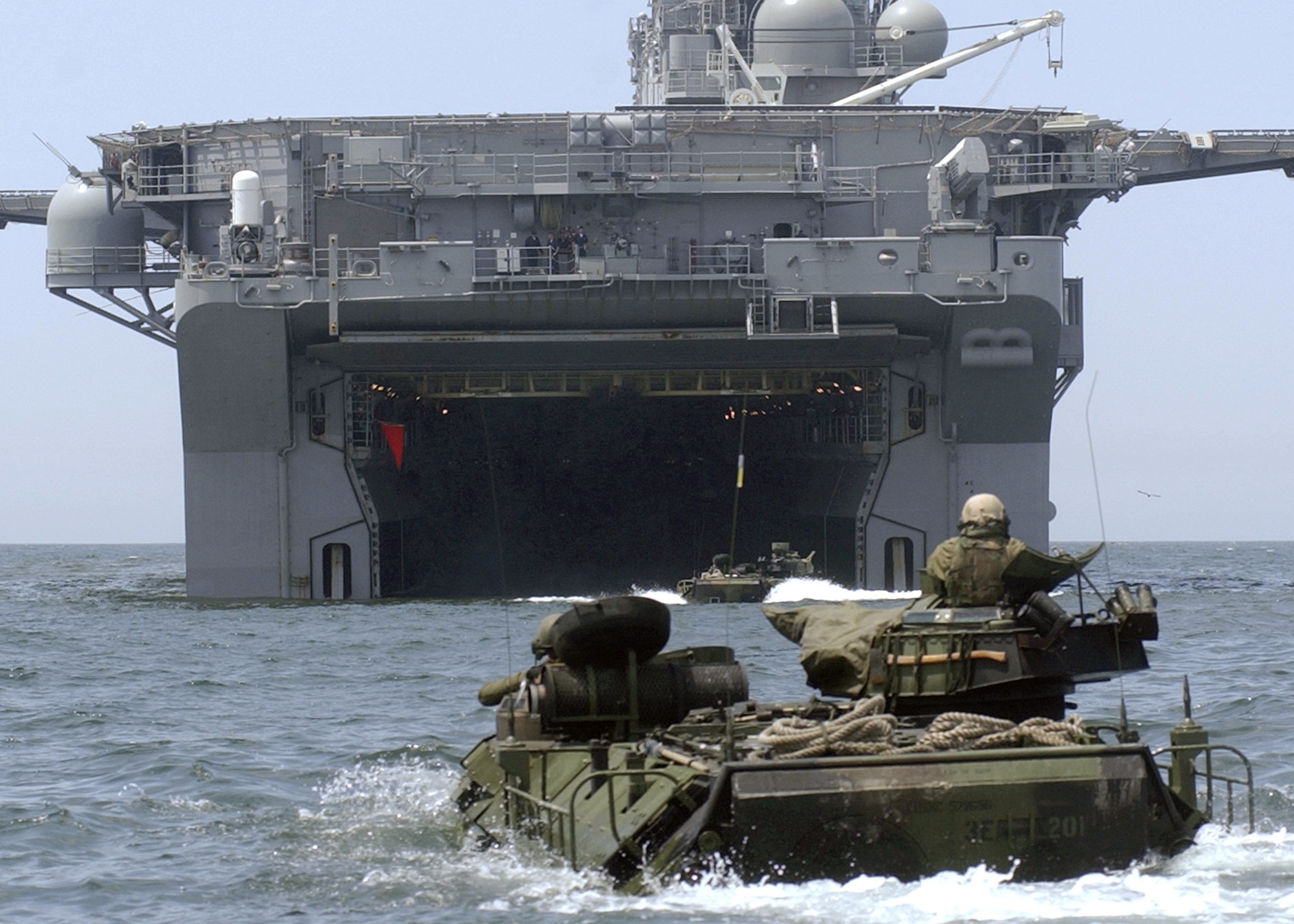
Assault Amphibious Vehicles approaching the well deck of USS Bonhomme Richard

The Marine Corps's counterpart under the Department of the Navy is the United States Navy. As a result, the Navy and Marine Corps have a close relationship, more so than with other branches of the military. White papers and promotional literature have commonly used the phrase "Navy-Marine Corps Team", or refer to "the Naval Service". Both the chief of naval operations (CNO) and commandant of the Marine Corps report directly to the secretary of the Navy.

Operationally, the Marine Corps provides the Fleet Marine Forces for service with the Navy's fleets, including the forward-deployed Marine Expeditionary Units embarked aboard Navy amphibious warships. The Corps also contributes some Marine Aviation fixed-wing fighter/attack assets (aircraft squadrons and related aircraft maintenance augmentation units) as part of the Carrier Air Wings deployed aboard aircraft carriers. The Marine Corps Security Force Regiment provides infantry-based security battalions and Fleet Anti-terrorism Security Team companies to guard and defend high-priority and overseas Navy bases. Security for the Presidential Retreat located at Camp David is provided by the Marine infantry battalion stationed as part of the garrison aboard Marine Barracks Washington.

Cooperation between the two services includes the training and instruction of some future Marine Corps officers (most are trained and commissioned through Marine Corps OCS), all Marine Corps Naval Aviators (aircraft pilots) and Naval Flight Officers (airborne weapons and sensor system officers), and some Navy and Marine Corps enlisted personnel. The Corps receives a significant portion of its officers from the United States Naval Academy (USNA) and Naval Reserve Officers Training Corps (NROTC). USNA and NROTC staff and faculty includes Marine Corps instructors. Marine Corps aviators and flight officers are trained in the Naval Air Training Command (NATRACOM) and are designated, or winged as Naval Aviators or Naval Flight Officers. The Marine Corps provides flight instructors to the Naval Air Training Command as well as drill instructors to the Navy's Officer Candidate School. Many enlisted Marines, particularly those in the aviation maintenance specialties, are trained at Navy technical training centers. The Marine Corps also provides ground combat training support to various Navy field medical (Hospital Corpsmen), Naval Construction Force (Seabee), and Navy Expeditionary Warfare personnel, units, and commands.

Training alongside each other is viewed as critical, as the Navy provides transport, logistical, and combat support to put Marine units into the fight, such as maritime prepositioning ships and naval gunfire support. Most Marine aviation assets ultimately derive from the Navy, with regard to acquisition, funding, and testing, and Navy aircraft carriers typically deploy with a Marine squadron alongside Navy squadrons. Marines do not recruit or train noncombatants such as chaplains or medical/dental personnel; naval personnel fill these roles. Some of these sailors, particularly Hospital corpsmen and Religious program specialists, generally wear Marine uniforms emblazoned with Navy insignia. Conversely, the Marine Corps is responsible for conducting land operations to support naval campaigns, including the seizure of naval bases. Both services operate a network security team in conjunction.

Marines and sailors share many naval traditions, especially terminology and customs. Marine Corps Medal of Honor recipients wear the Navy variant of this and other awards; and with few exceptions, the awards and badges of the Navy and Marine Corps are identical. Much of testing for new Marine Corps aircraft is done at Naval Air Station Patuxent River. The Navy's Blue Angels flight demonstration team is staffed by both Navy and Marine officers and enlisted personnel.

In 2007, the Marine Corps joined with the Navy and Coast Guard to adopt a new maritime strategy called A Cooperative Strategy for 21st Century Seapower that raises the notion of prevention of war to the same philosophical level as the conduct of war. This new strategy charts a course for the Navy, Coast Guard and Marine Corps to work collectively with each other and international partners to prevent regional crises, human-made or natural, from occurring or reacting quickly should one occur to avoid negative impacts to the United States.

=== United States Army ===
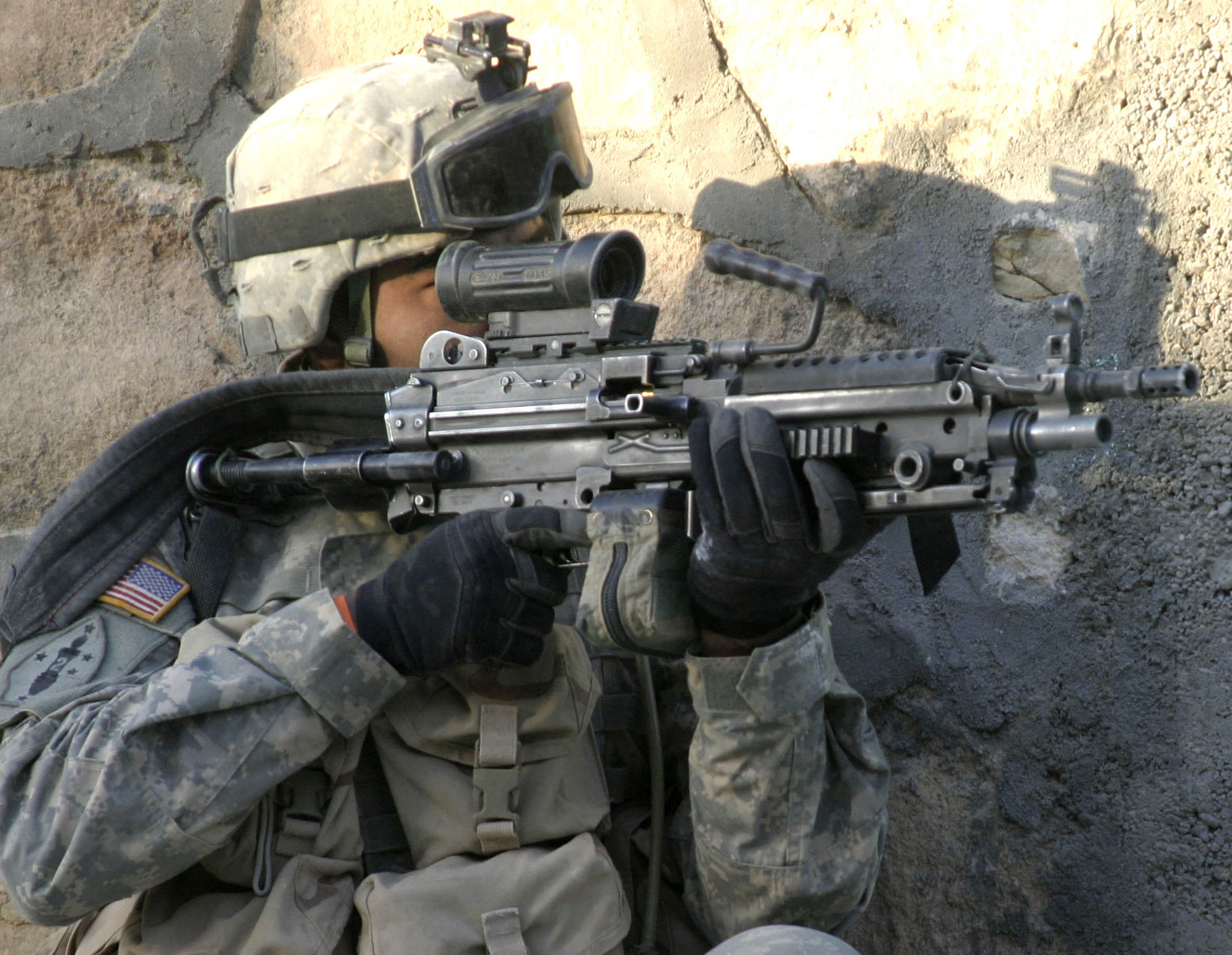
A soldier from the 1st Infantry Regiment provides security for a joint Army-Marine patrol in Rawa in 2006. The shoulder sleeve insignia has the logo of the 2nd Marine Division.

The Marine Corps capabilities overlap with those of the United States Army, historically creating competition for funding and missions. The competition dates back to the founding of the Continental Marines, when General George Washington refused to allow the initial Marine battalions to be drawn from among his Continental Army. In the aftermath of World War II, Army leadership made efforts to restructure the American defense establishment including the dissolution of the Marine Corps and the folding of its capabilities into the other services. Leading this movement were such prominent Army officers as General Dwight D. Eisenhower and Army chief of staff George C. Marshall.

The Goldwater-Nichols Act significantly reshaped the services roles and relationships with each other, enforcing more joint decision making. Department of Defense Directive 5100.01 tasks both the Army and Marine Corps with expeditionary and amphibious operations. With most of the 2000s spent in operations in Afghanistan and Iraq, Secretary of Defense Robert Gates voiced concerns that the Marine Corps are becoming a "second Army". Since these comments, the Marine Corps has shed its main battle tanks, reduced its size, and focused more on operations in littoral areas where the Army is not explicitly tasked to operate.

The Army maintains much larger and diverse combat arms, special operations, and logistics forces. The Army has much lighter and expeditionary forces in its infantry and airborne infantry brigade combat teams. The Army also maintains heavier and more logistically taxing armored brigade combat teams. The Marine Corps, in comparison, maintains forces between these two extremes of mobility and protection. The Marine Corps organizes much smaller deployable units with integrated aviation support. The Marine Corps was historically hesitant to provide forces to U.S. Special Operations Command, instead making specialty units available to its division commanders. The Army has maintained Special Forces, Rangers, civil affairs, psychological operations, special operations aviation, and special missions units for decades. In 2003, the Marine Corps created the present-day successors to the Marine Raiders and provided them to Special Operations Command starting with the establishment of MCSOCOM Detachment One. The modern Marine Raider training pipeline was based on input from U.S. Army Ranger and Special Forces units.

Culturally, Marines and soldiers share most of the common U.S. military slang and terminology, but the Corps uses a large number of naval terms and traditions incompatible with Army lifestyle, as well as its own unique vernacular. As the Army Reserve and Army National Guard is much larger than the Marine Corps's Reserve, many more former active duty Marines continue their service in the Army's reserve components. The Army does not require transfers from the Marines, Air Force Security Forces, or special operations of any branch to attend Army Basic Combat Training. Due to the requirement that all inter-service transfers attend Marine Corps Recruit Training, very few former soldiers serve in the Marine Corps.

=== United States Air Force ===
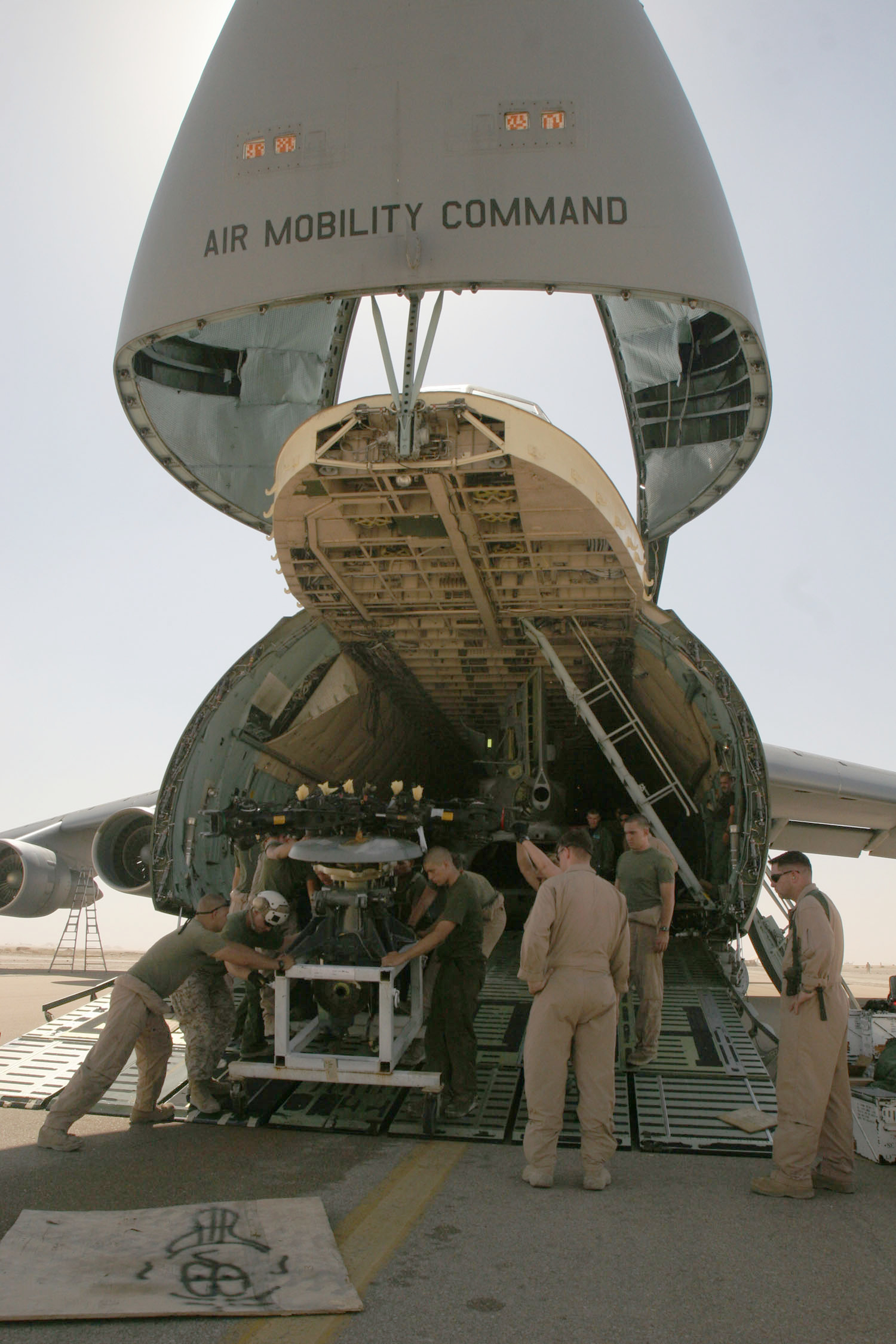
Marines unloading CH-46 Sea Knight helicopters from an Air Force C-5 Galaxy

While some of Marine Corps Aviation assets ultimately derive from the Navy, a large amount of support is drawn from the United States Air Force. The Marine Corps makes extensive use of the USAF Air Mobility Command to airlift Marines and equipment, along with using close air support from the Air Force. The Air Force may also attach Tactical Air Control Party units to conventional Marine ground forces to provide coordination for close air support.

The Air Force traditionally provides the Joint Force Air Component Commander (JFACC) who controls "sorties for air defense, and long range interdiction and reconnaissance" while the MAGTF commander retains control of the Marines' organic aviation assets, however Marine Aviation missions not directly in the support of the MAGTF will be typically controlled by the JFACC.

=== United States Coast Guard ===
The Marine Corps shares a sphere of operation with units of the United States Coast Guard, including operation of the Joint Maritime Training Center (JMTC) (previously known as the Special Missions Training Center (SMTC)), a joint Coast Guard, Navy, and Marine Corps training facility located on the Marine Corps Base Camp Lejeune in Camp Lejeune, North Carolina.

== Budget ==
According to the Department of the Navy (from whence the Marine Corps receives its funding), for FY 2019, the Marine Corps received $43.2B in funding.

Appropriation Summary – United States Marine Corps (in millions of dollars)
Area	FY2018	FY2019
Military Personnel	13,197	13,888
Reserve Personnel	763	785
Medicare-Eligible Retiree Health Fund Contribution	903	831
Medicare-Eligible Retiree Health Fund Contribution, Reserves	81	74
Operation and Maintenance	8,118	7,843
Operation and Maintenance, Reserve	287	275
Procurement	2,019	2,858
Procurement of Ammunition, Navy/Marine Corps	1,038*	1,182*
Military Construction, Navy and Marine Corps	1,993*	2,593*
Total Appropriated	28,399	30,329

* not exact since certain fields are combined with Navy expenditures

In 2013, the USMC became the first American military branch to ever have a fully audited annual budget.

== See also ==
- Category:Ad hoc units and formations of the United States Marine Corps
- Marine Corps Key Volunteer Network
- Marine Corps Planning Process
- United States Marine Corps Women's Reserve
- List of United States Marine Corps acronyms and expressions
