= Solar power at the White House =

History of solar panels at the Executive Mansion

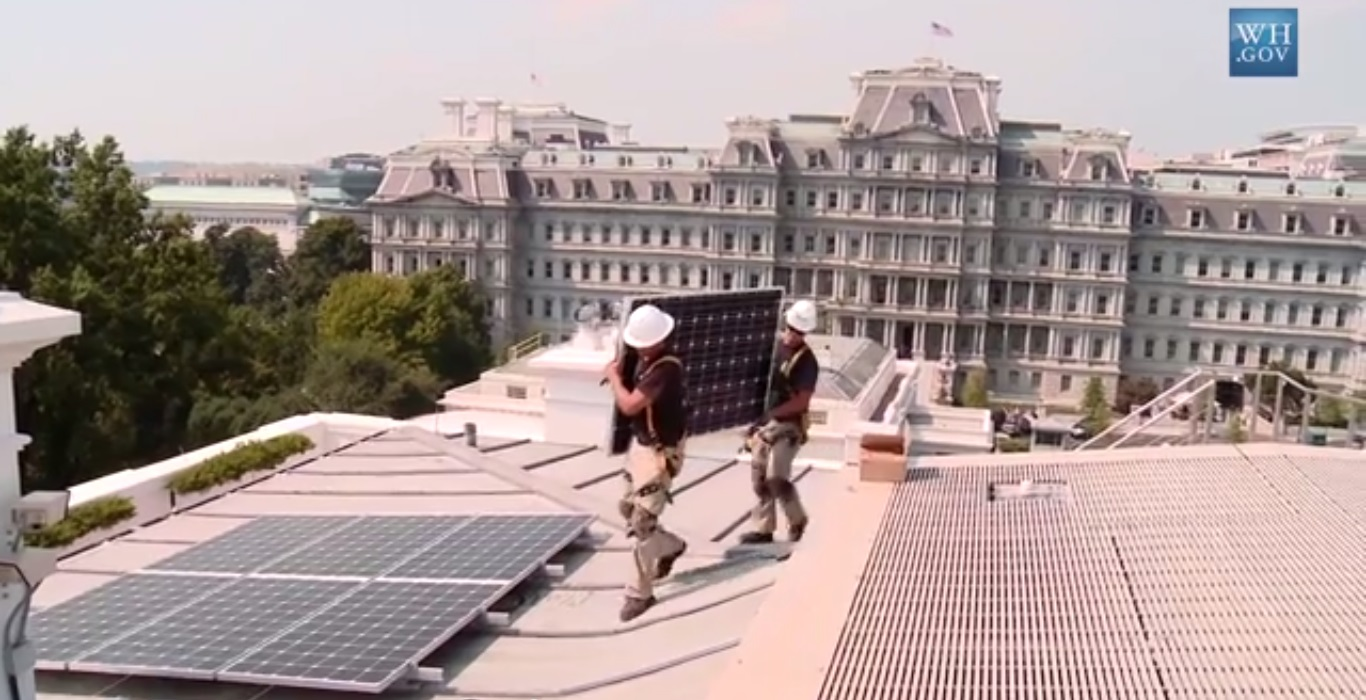
Solar panels being installed on the White House roof, 2014

Solar power at the White House was first introduced in 1979. The solar panels were removed in 1986. Solar power was reintroduced early in the 21st century.

== Background ==
Mechanical engineer Fred Morse was approached by the Richard Nixon administration to assess the potential of solar power. He took several years to work out what could be installed on the roof of the White House. The panels could not alter or change the look of the house, and were ultimately white as opposed to a darker colour for aesthetic reasons.

The need for alternative sources of energy than fossil fuels and energy independence grew in the wake of the oil crises of 1973 and 1979. Jimmy Carter's reviewing stand for his inauguration was warmed by solar panels. The Carter administration increased the budget for the development of energy technology research and introduced tax credits for solar power.

== Carter administration ==
On June 20, 1979, 32 solar water heating panels were placed on the roof of the West Wing. The panels were made by InterTechnology/Solar Corp. from Warrenton, Virginia and installed by Hector Guevara of Alternate Energy Industries Corp. At the dedication ceremony for the panels, President Carter said, "In the year 2000 this solar water heater behind me, which is being dedicated today, will still be here supplying cheap, efficient energy... A generation from now, this solar heater can either be a curiosity, a museum piece, an example of a road not taken or it can be just a small part of one of the greatest and most exciting adventures ever undertaken by the American people".

The panels provided almost 75 percent of the energy to heat 1,000 US gallons (3,800 L) of water in the staff kitchen of the White House. The Carter administration had set a goal for renewable energy in the United States to generate 20 percent of the nation's energy needs by the year 2000. Tax breaks for solar panels were eliminated under the Ronald Reagan administration.

== Removal under the Reagan administration ==
The panels were removed in 1986 during the Reagan administration during the resurfacing of the roof, and stored in a warehouse in Franconia, Virginia.

An official from Unity College asked that they be released to them, and they were moved to the college in an old school bus and installed in 1992. The panels were used to reheat water for the college's dining hall. The college received a letter from Carter expressing his happiness at their installation. In October 2004, the college planned to auction the solar panels as they had become outdated.

Three of the panels are part of museum collections. One of the panels was donated by Unity College to the National Museum of American History in 2009. Another is on display at the Jimmy Carter Presidential Center. A third panel has been part of the Solar Science and Technology Museum in Dezhou, China since 2013.

== 21st century ==
In August 2002, the George W. Bush administration reinstalled solar thermal heaters. These units are used to heat water for landscape maintenance personnel and for the presidential pool and spa. One hundred and sixty-seven solar photovoltaic grid-tied panels were installed at the same time on the roof of the maintenance facility. The changes were not publicized, as a White House spokeswoman said the changes were an internal matter. The story was picked up by industry trade journals.

In 2010, Steven Chu, the secretary of energy under the Barack Obama administration, announced that solar panels would be installed on the roof saying that "As we move towards a clean energy economy, the White House will lead by example". The panels were installed in 2013, making it the first time any solar power would be used for the president's living quarters.
