= Flags at Buckingham Palace =

The Royal Standard of the United Kingdom used outside Scotland

The Union Flag is the national flag that represents the country.

Flags at Buckingham Palace vary according to the movements of court and tradition. The King's Flag Sergeant is responsible for all flags flown from the palace.

== Tradition ==
Until 1997 the only flag to fly from Buckingham Palace was the Royal Standard, the official flag of the reigning British sovereign, and only when the sovereign was in residence at the palace.

Even in times of mourning, the Royal Standard would not fly at half mast ("The king is dead, long live the king!"). However, it flew at half-mast for several hours from the death of King Edward VII until King George V discovered the error.

The only time a different flag would be flown from the Palace would be upon the death of the sovereign, when the flag of the next most senior member of the Royal Family present at the palace would be raised.

The size of the flag is varied according to the importance of the event, with a normal-sized flag being used most of the time. On state or ceremonial occasions, such as the wedding of Prince William and Catherine Middleton, the Diamond Jubilee in 2012 and the sovereign's official birthday, a much larger flag is flown.

== Change of protocol ==
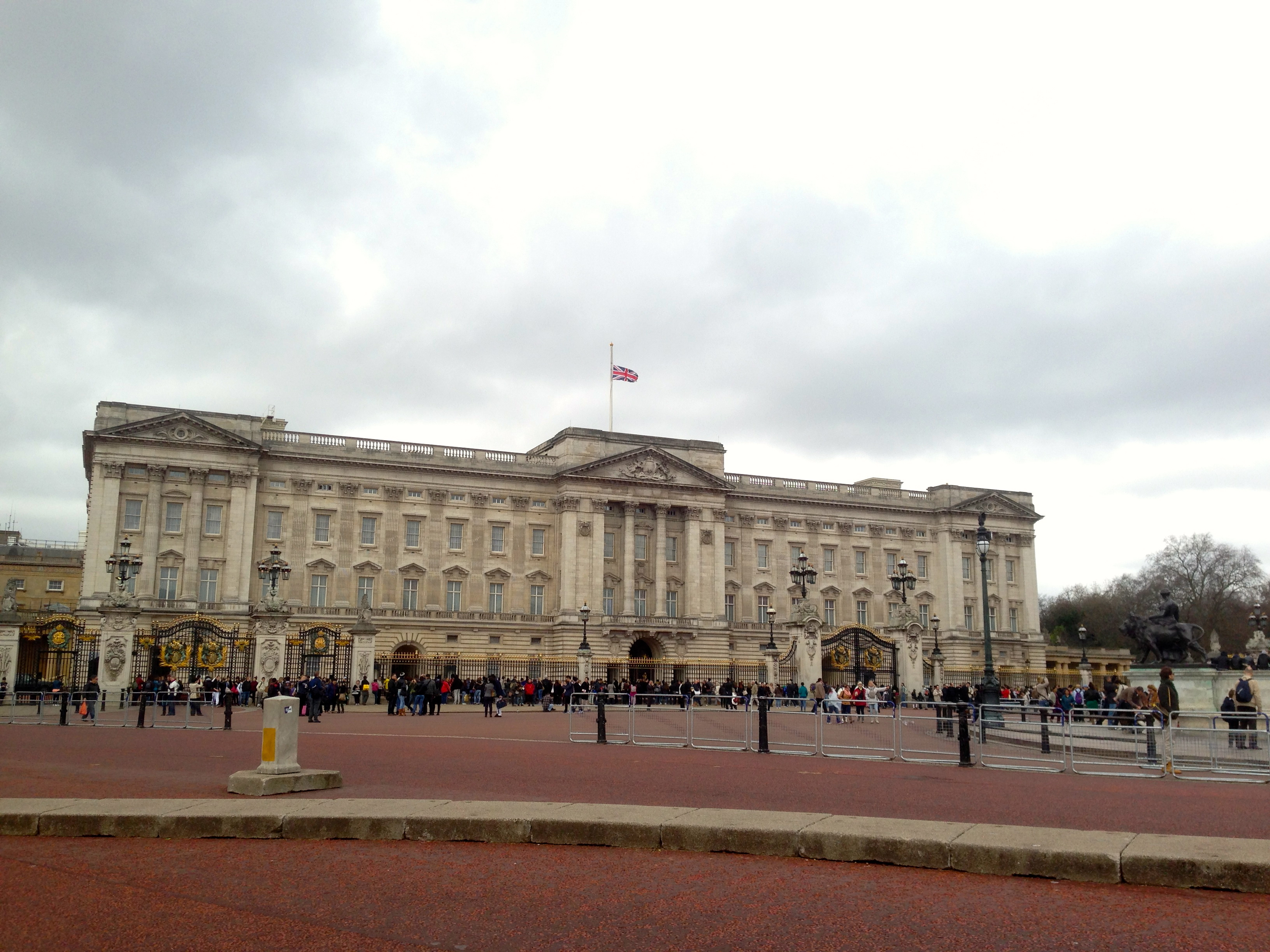
The Union Flag flies at half-mast over Buckingham Palace after the death of Baroness Thatcher.

This tradition changed in 1997, following the death of Diana, Princess of Wales, when the tabloid press reported alleged public outrage because the palace did not fly a flag at half mast. Queen Elizabeth II was at Balmoral Castle at the time, and so there was no flag flying. In response to this display of public opinion, Queen Elizabeth II ordered a break with protocol and the Union Flag was flown at half mast over the Palace on the day of Diana's funeral. Since Diana's death, the Union Flag flies from the Palace when the monarch is not in residence, and has flown at half mast upon the deaths of members of the Royal Family such as Princess Margaret and the Queen Mother in 2002, the Prince Philip, Duke of Edinburgh in 2021, Queen Elizabeth II in 2022, the Duchess of Kent in 2025, and other times of national mourning such as following the terrorist bombings in London in 2005, the deaths of former U.S. President Gerald Ford and former British Prime Minister Margaret Thatcher, and the Christchurch mosque shootings in 2019 as well as the London Bridge stabbing on 29 November that year.

Since King Charles III’s accession to the throne in 2022, he has maintained Clarence House as his primary residence in London while Buckingham Palace undergoes renovation. The Royal Standard is therefore currently flown at Buckingham Palace and Clarence House at the same time when he is present in either building.

== Other royal residences ==
Similar protocols are followed at different royal residences, depending on location and the member of the royal family in residence. Clarence House, for example, was latterly the official London residence of King Charles III when he was Prince of Wales, so would fly his personal standard when he was in residence. Similarly, when it was the home of Queen Elizabeth The Queen Mother, it would fly her personal standard. After her death in 2002, her standard was flown at half mast during the mourning period.

== See also ==
- Flags at the White House
