= South Lawn =

Location within the White House campus in Washington, DC

Coordinates: 38°53′49″N 77°02′12″W

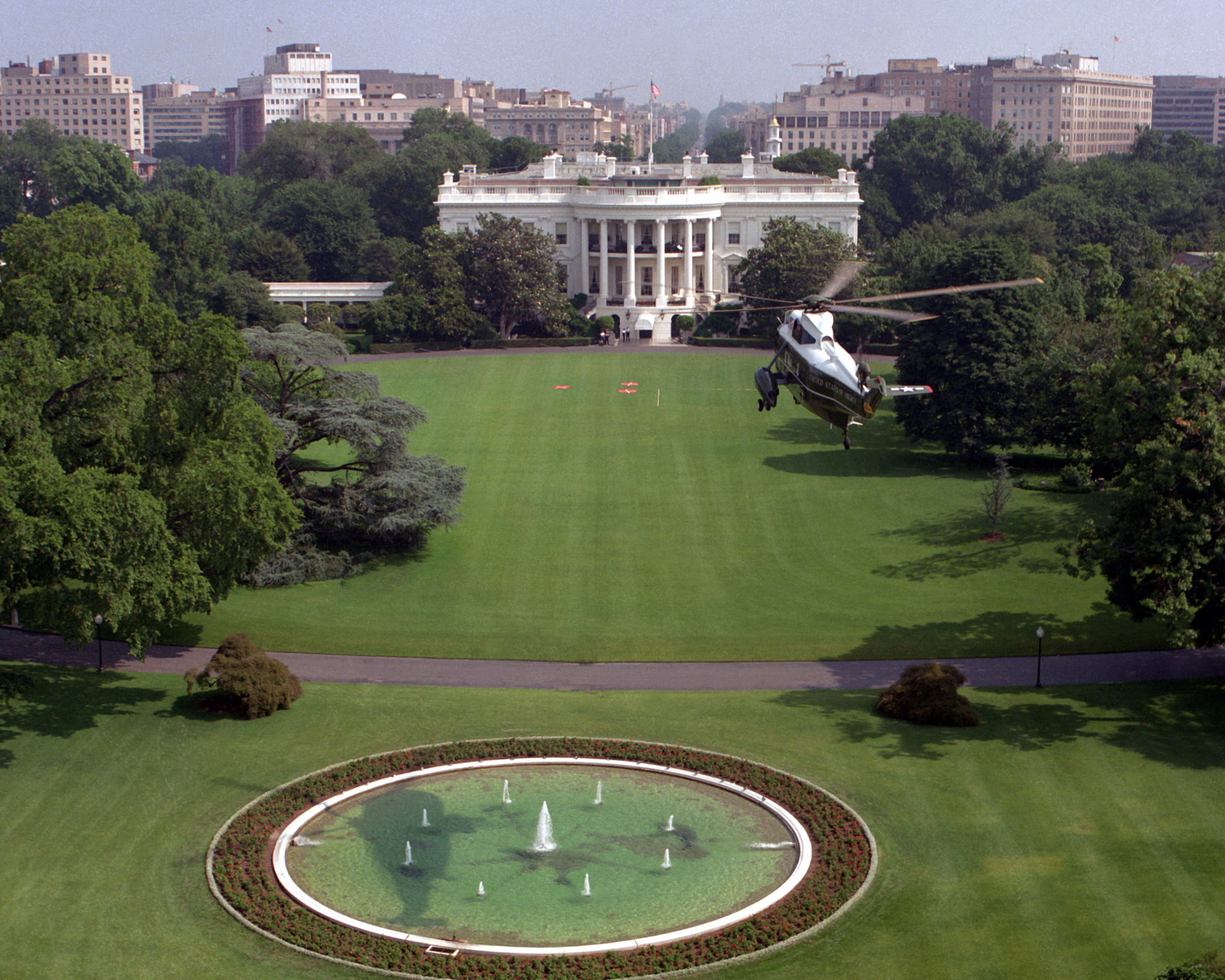
Marine One descending to its landing on the South Lawn in July 1987

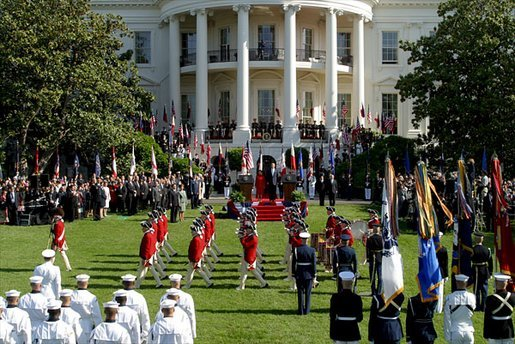
State Arrival Ceremony for President Gloria Macapagal Arroyo of the Philippines in May 2003

The South Lawn at the White House in Washington, D.C., is directly south of the house and is bordered on the east by East Executive Drive and the Treasury Building, on the west by West Executive Drive and the Old Executive Office Building, and along its curved southern perimeter by South Executive Drive and a large circular public lawn called The Ellipse.

Since the address of the White House is 1600 Pennsylvania Avenue NW, and the North Lawn faces Pennsylvania Avenue, the South Lawn is sometimes described as the back lawn of the White House.

== Description and use ==
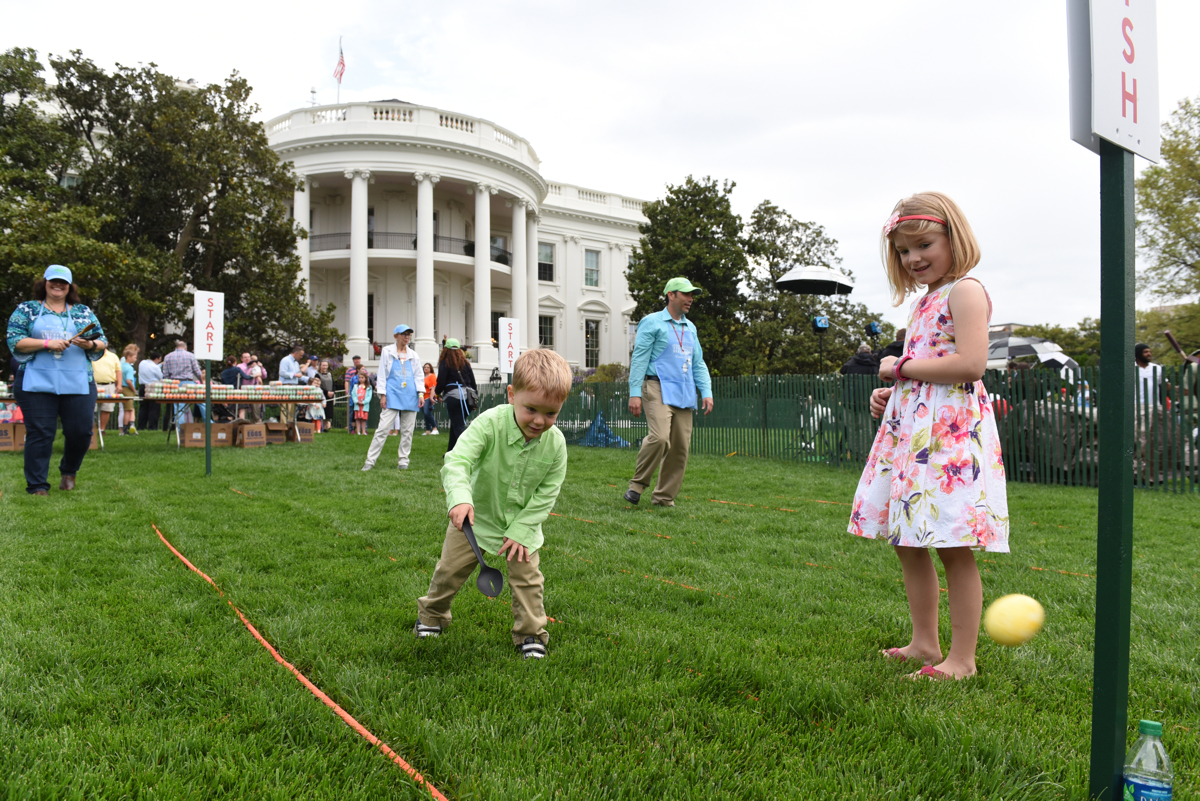
The Easter Egg Roll on the South Lawn in April 2017

The South Lawn presents a long north–south vista from the White House. Open to the public until World War II, it is now a closed part of the White House grounds that provides a setting for official events like the State Arrival Ceremony as well as informal gatherings including the annual White House Egg Rolling Contest and staff barbecues. Marine One, the presidential helicopter, departs from and lands on the South Lawn.

== History and design ==
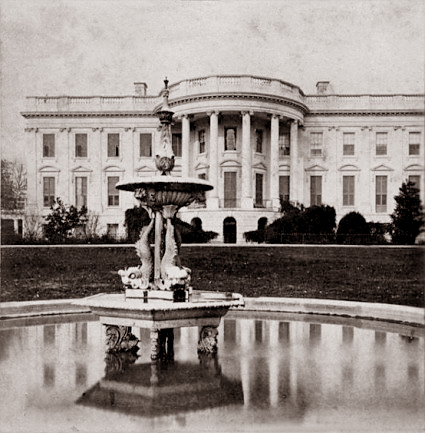
A stereograph showing the earliest fountain on the South Lawn, c. 1868

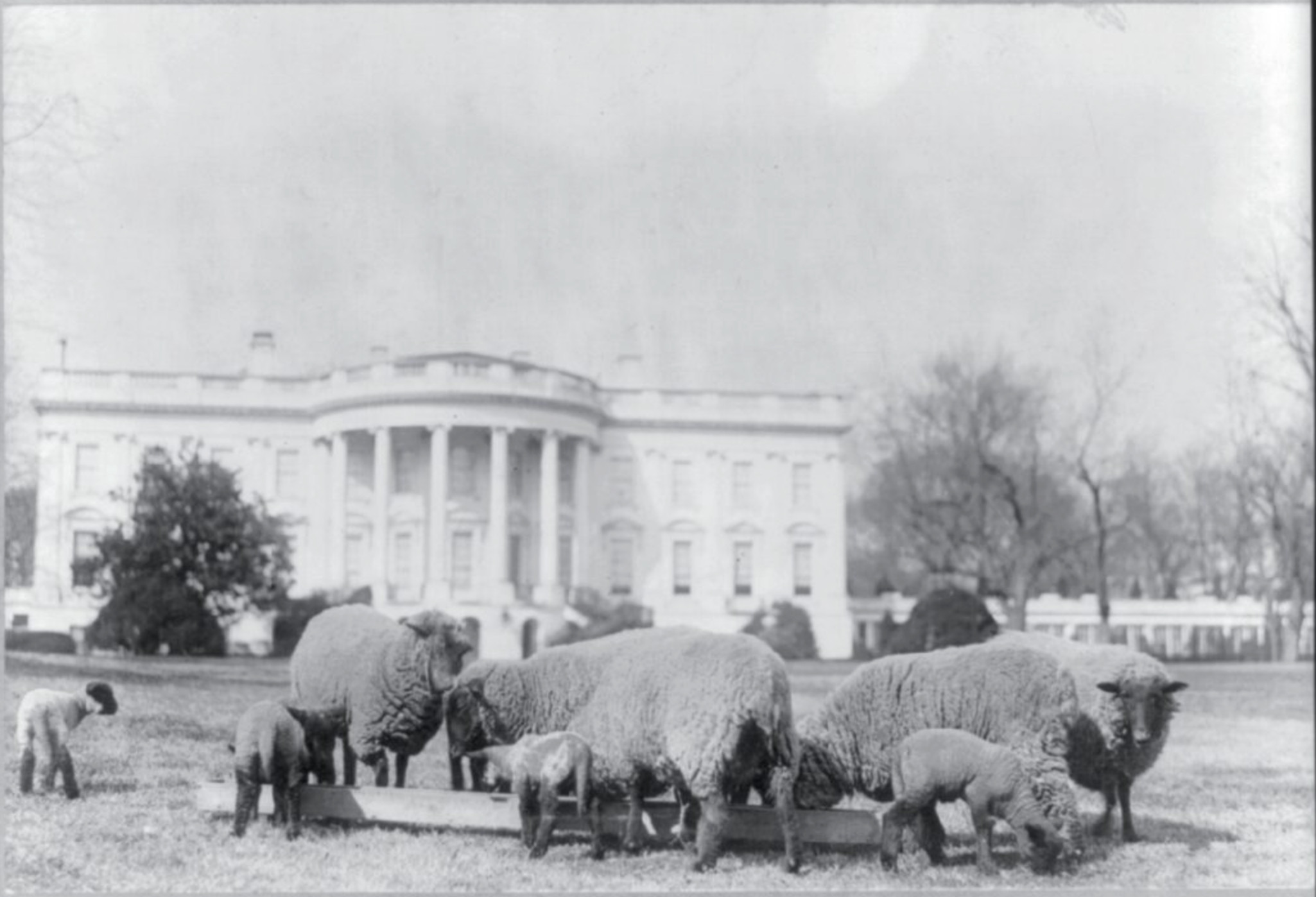
Sheep graze on the South Lawn during the administration of Woodrow Wilson, 1918

When the White House was first occupied in 1800 the site of the South Lawn was an open meadow gradually descending to a large marsh, the Tiber Creek, and Potomac River beyond. Thomas Jefferson completed grading of the South Lawn, building up mounds on either side of a central lawn. Jefferson, working with architect Benjamin Henry Latrobe located a triumphal arch as a main entry point to the grounds, just southeast of the White House. Pierre-Charles L'Enfant's 1793 plan of the city of Washington, indicates a setting of terraced formal gardens descending to Tiber Creek. Later in 1850, landscape designer Andrew Jackson Downing attempted to soften the geometry of the L'Enfant plan, incorporating a semicircular southern boundary and meandering paths. Andrew Jackson Downing's changes included enlarging the South Lawn, creating a large circular lawn he termed the "Parade or President's Park" and bordered by densely planted shrubs and trees. During the administration of Ulysses S. Grant the marsh to the south was drained, and the South Lawn received additional grading and 8 to 10 feet (2.4 to 3.0 m) of fill to make the descent to the Potomac more gradual.

During the administrations of Rutherford B. Hayes and Grover Cleveland's first term, the U.S. Army Corps of Engineers were engaged to reconfigure the South Lawn, reducing the size of Downing's circular parade, and creating the current boundaries much as they presently are. Theodore Roosevelt, who had engaged the architectural firm of McKim, Mead, and White to reconfigure and rebuild parts of the White House in 1902, was influenced to remove the complex of Victorian era glass houses built up the West Colonnade and the site of the present West Wing. In 1934, President Franklin D. Roosevelt engaged Frederick Law Olmsted Jr. to evaluate the grounds and recommend changes. Olmsted understood the need to offer presidents and their families a modicum of privacy balancing with the requirement for public views of the White House. The Olmsted plan presented the landscape largely as seen today: retaining or planting large specimen trees and shrubs on the perimeter to create boundaries for visual privacy, but punctuated with generous sight lines of the house from north and south.

The 1974 White House helicopter incident ended on the South Lawn.

In 2025, President Donald Trump installed a pair of 88-foot tall flagpoles on the South and North Lawns.

A temporary 5,000-seat arena was erected on the South Lawn for UFC Freedom 250 in 2026, the only professional sporting event to be held on White House grounds. After the event, the arena was replaced with a granite helipad to accommodate the new Sikorsky VH-92 Patriot, which scorched and uprooted the grass beneath it.

== Horticulture ==
=== Grass ===
The lawn is planted with a grass variety called tall fescue.

=== Specimen trees ===
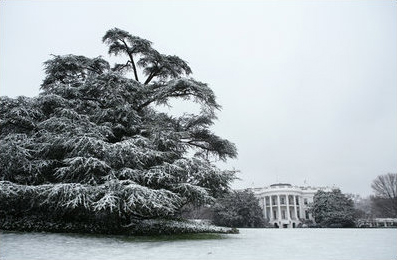
Snow on the Atlas Cedar on the South Lawn in January 2007

Trees on the South Lawn include southern magnolias (Magnolia grandiflora) on either side of the South portico, Japanese threadleaf maple (Acer palmatum dissectum), American elm (Ulmus americana), white oak (Quercus alba), white saucer magnolia (Magnolia × soulangeana), Atlas cedar (Cedrus atlantica), sugar maple (Acer saccharum), and northern red oak (Quercus rubra).

=== Seasonal plantings ===
The South Lawn pool and fountain is planted seasonally with borders of tulips edged by grape hyacinth (Muscari armeniacum) for spring, red geranium (Pelargonium) and Dusty Miller (Senecio cineraria) in summer, and chrysanthemum (Chrysanthemum cinerariaefolium) in fall.

== Amenities ==
=== Ceremonial gardens ===
The two ceremonial gardens of the White House (the Rose Garden and the Jacqueline Kennedy Garden) face the South Lawn. The Rose Garden (sometimes referred to as "The presidents Garden") is located south-west of the main residence along the west colonnade, just outside the Oval Office. The Jacqueline Kennedy Garden is located south-east of the main residence along the east colonnade. The garden was dedicated by Lady Bird Johnson as the Jacqueline Kennedy Garden on April 22, 1965, although it has been called the "First Lady's Garden" by some later administrations.

=== Tennis and basketball court ===
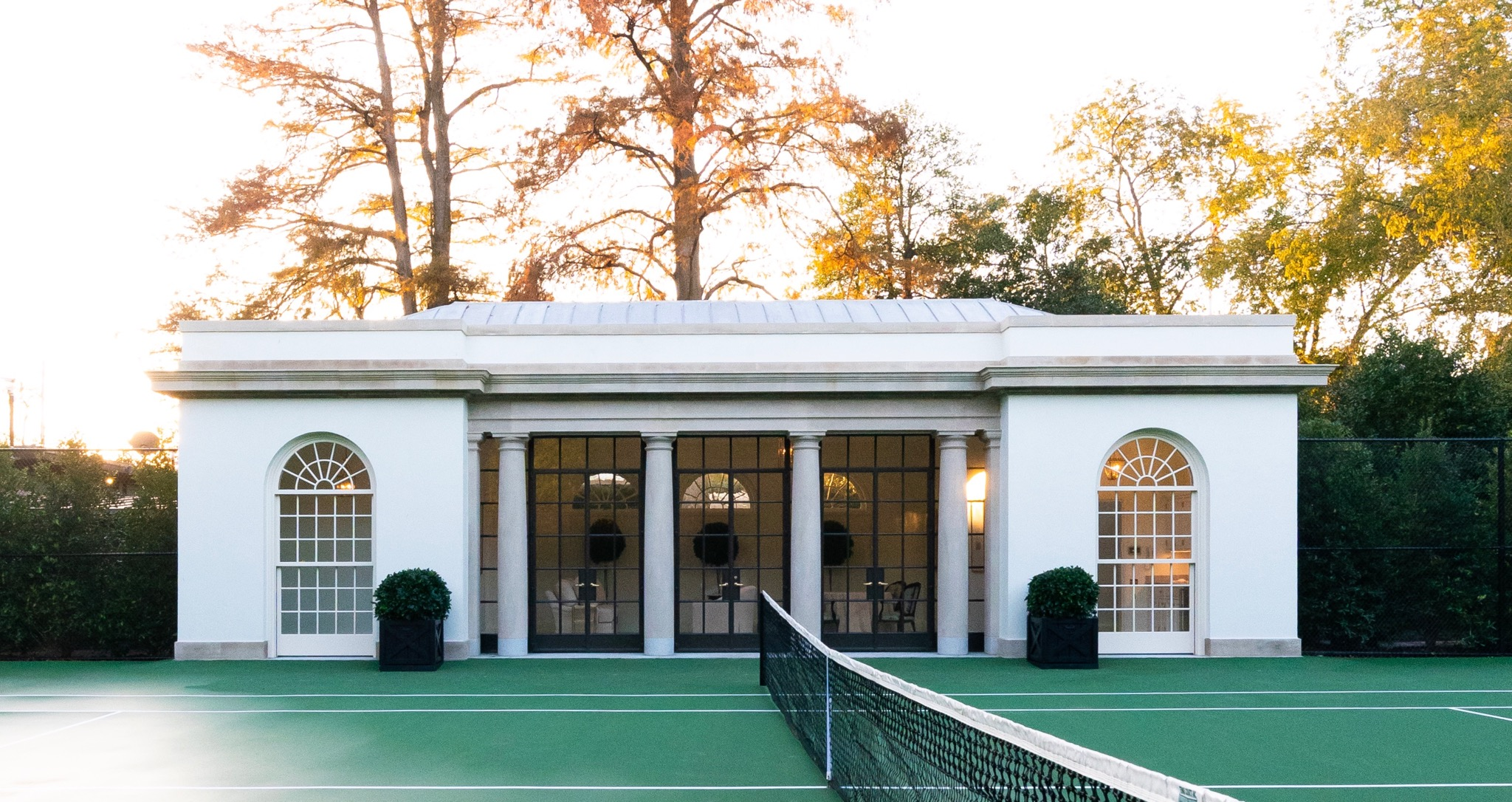
Tennis Pavilion on the South Lawn in 2020

A tennis court was first installed during the Theodore Roosevelt administration on the south lawn. Since then, the court has been moved several times, eventually landing in its current position in the south-west area. President Obama had basketball court lines and removable baskets installed so he could play full court basketball. Located just west of the tennis and basketball court is a half-court basketball area that also housed a horseshoe pit. During Donald Trump's first term, Melania Trump oversaw the design and construction of the White House Tennis Pavilion by the firm Steven W. Spandle Architect in 2020.

=== Swimming pool ===
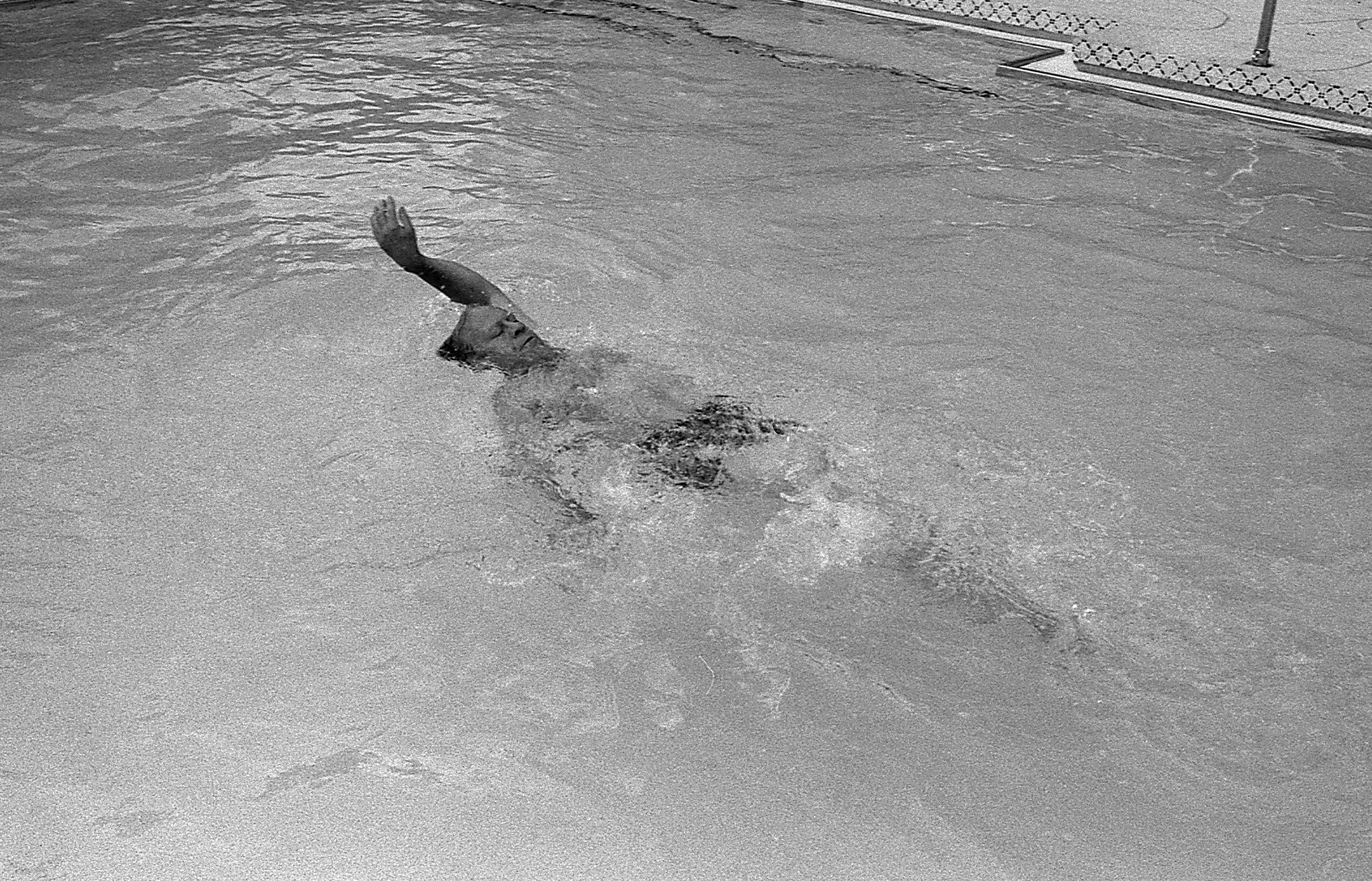
President Ford swimming in the White House swimming pool in July 1975

In 1975, the outdoor swimming pool was installed by President Gerald Ford. It is located directly south of the West Wing, surrounded by a thick row of trees for privacy. A cabana was later added. The original pool at the White House was indoors, located in between the main residence and the West Wing. However, President Richard Nixon turned it into an area for the press, now known as the James S. Brady Press Briefing Room.

=== Putting green ===
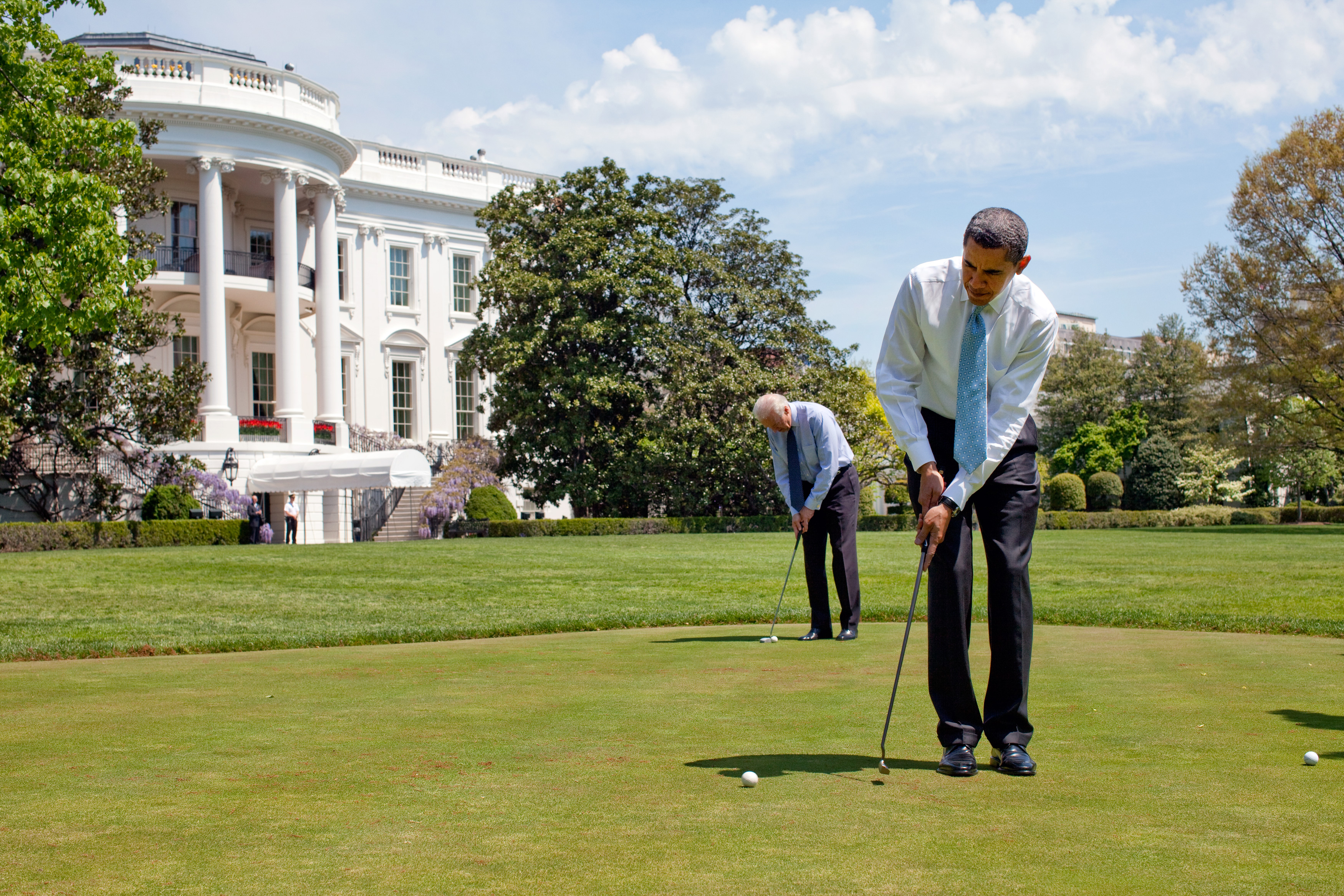
Barack Obama and Joe Biden on the White House Putting Green in April 2009

The putting green was first installed in 1954 by President Dwight D. Eisenhower who was an avid golfer. It was removed by President Nixon and later reinstalled by President George H. W. Bush in 1991. President Bill Clinton moved it to its current location just south of the Rose Garden, a short walk from the Oval Office.

=== Horseshoe pit ===
A horseshoe pit was created on the site of the present putting green by Harry Truman, and later re-established near the swimming pool by George H. W. Bush who was an avid player. Two month long horseshoe tournaments were held bi-annually during Bush's presidency, with teams consisting of maintenance and house staff and family members and administration personnel. Bush would frequently demonstrate his prowess at horseshoes for foreign dignitaries.

=== Children's garden ===
The children's garden is located between the tennis court and basketball court to the south-west area of the property. The garden was a gift to the White House in 1968 from President Johnson and his wife. The garden supplies a secluded location for children to play in private. The garden features a goldfish pond in the sitting area. Footprints and handprints of various President's children and grandchildren are embedded in various stones making up the walkway.

=== Helipad ===
Sikorsky VH-92 Patriot initial takeoff from the helipad in September 2026

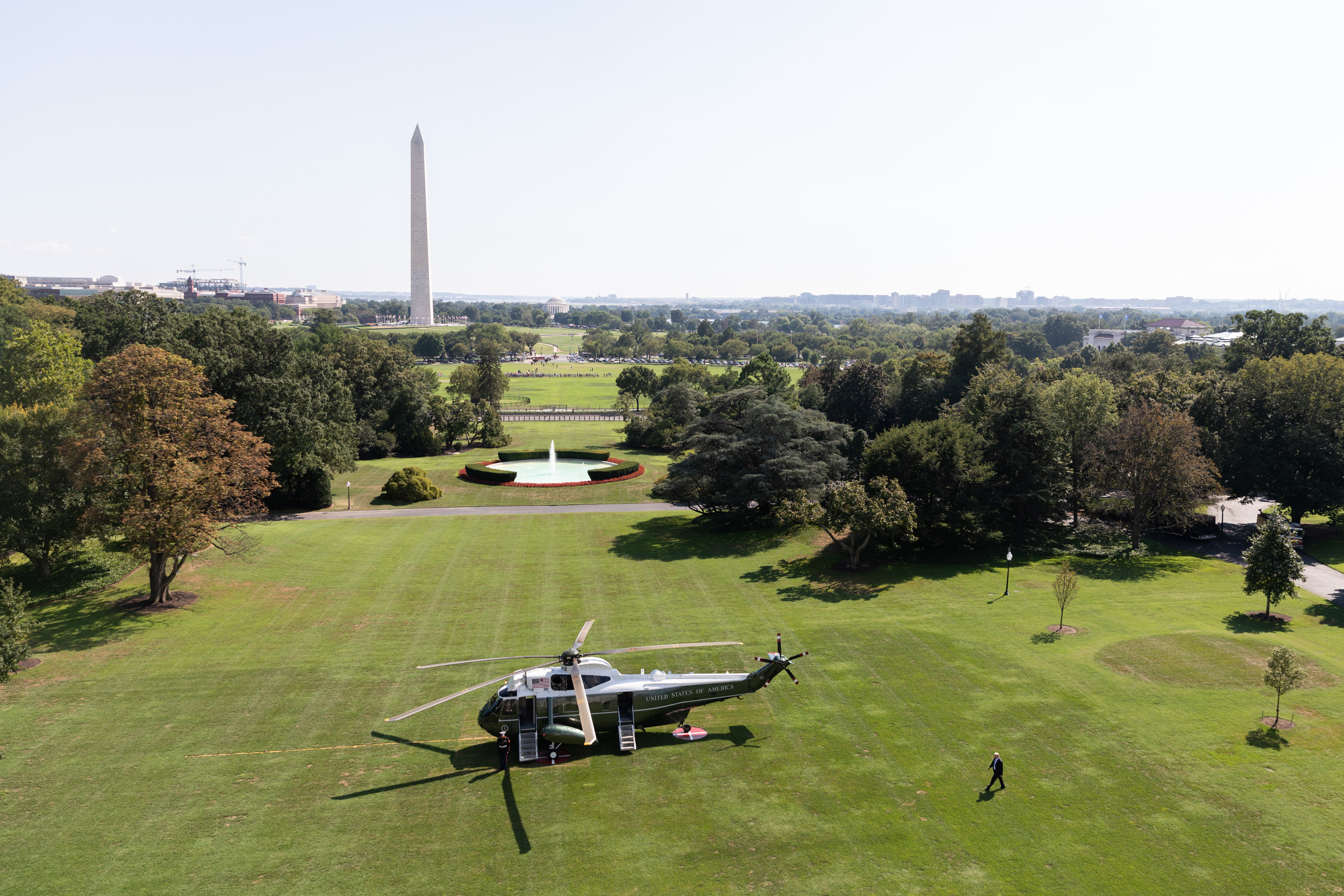
VH-3D on South Lawn with the Washington Monument and the Jefferson Memorial (background) in September 2018

The South Lawn includes a helipad for the president's helicopter, Marine One, to land directly on the White House grounds. Beginning in 1957, the presidential helicopter landed on manually-placed temporary metal disks on the South Lawn. In 2018, the Sikorsky VH-92 Patriot was found to uproot grass and create hazardous flying debris. To accommodate the VH-92 Patriot, in 2026 President Trump ordered the construction of a roughly 100-foot (30 m) diameter helipad depicting the presidential seal on the former landing zone in June 2026. The helipad was completed in early September 2026 financed entirely by Sikorsky Aircraft.

=== Running track ===
President Clinton had a quarter-mile (0.4 km) long jogging track installed during his presidency in 1993. An avid runner, Clinton would regularly want to go on runs, but his doing so greatly disrupted Washington traffic; thus the track was built adjacent to the South Lawn driveway. At a distance, its spongy surface is virtually indistinguishable from the driveway's asphalt.

=== Playground ===
A playground was installed in 2009 under President Obama for his two children, Sasha and Malia Obama. The playground was located just south of the Oval Office near the Rose Garden, but removed at the end of the Obama administration.

=== Vegetable garden ===
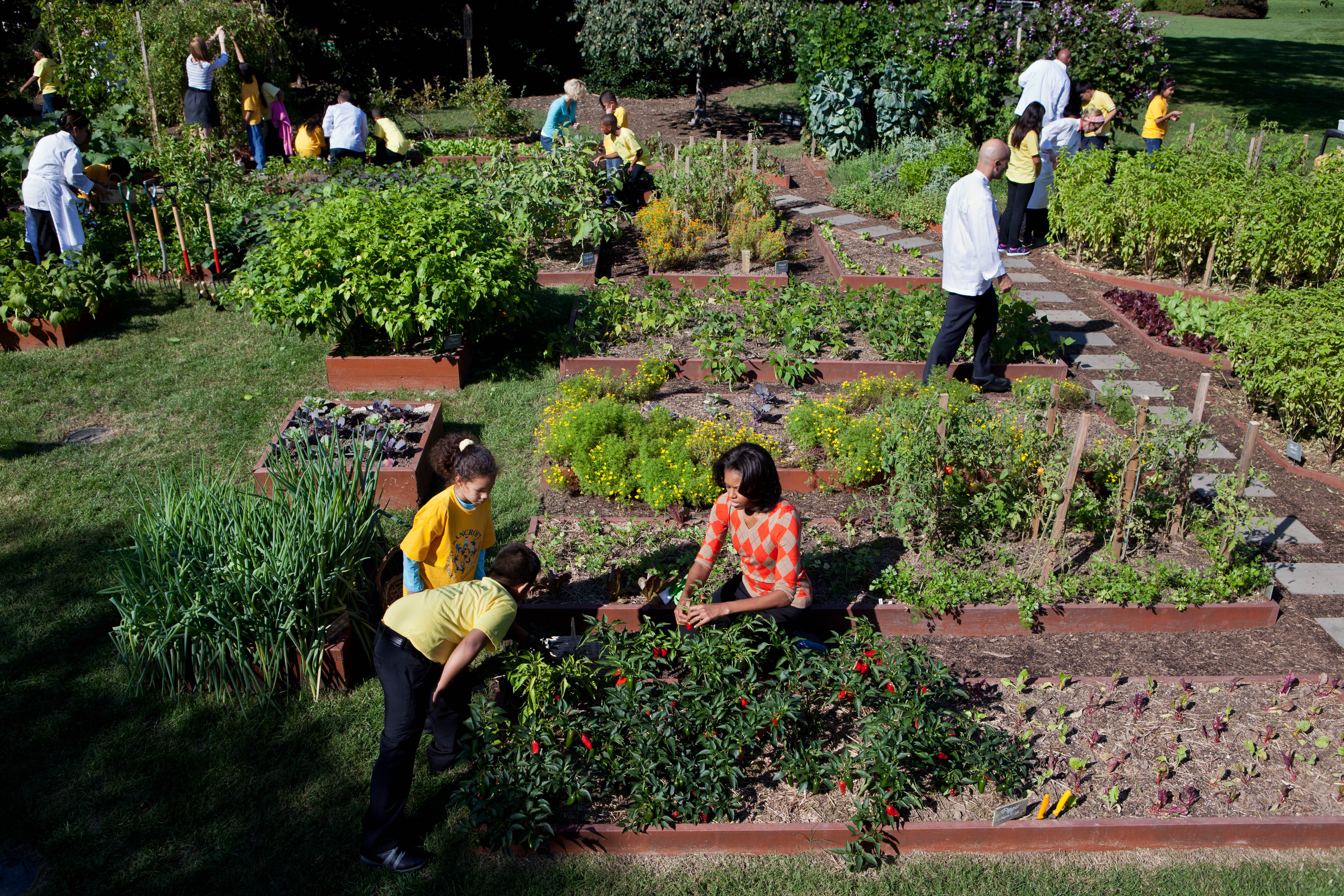
First Lady Michelle Obama harvests vegetables with Washington, D.C. students in 2011.

Michelle Obama installed a vegetable garden during her husband's presidency on the far south area of the property. The vegetables grown are used at the White House for meals as well as donated to area shelters.

=== Beehives ===
Artisan beehive installed in 2026

In 2009, Michelle Obama moved two beehives to the South Lawn that White House Carpenter Charlie Brandt installed on the complex a few years prior as a hobby. The organic honey is used in food preparation for the First Family, state dinners, and gatherings while serving as official gifts.

In 2026, Melania Trump announced the expansion of the White House honey program with the addition of a newly installed beehive. Hand-crafted by a local artisan in the image of the White House, the new hive added two bee colonies, bringing the number of colonies to four.

=== Belleau Wood tree ===
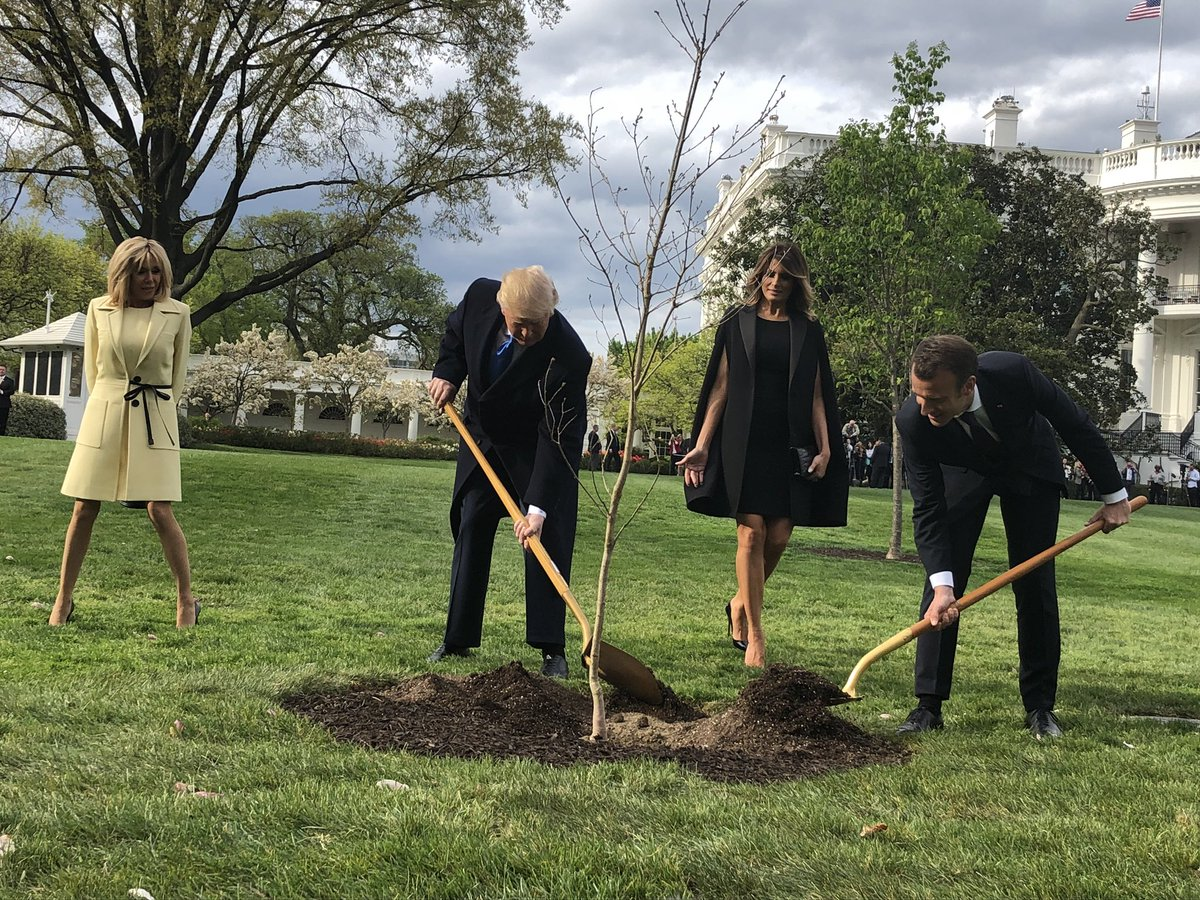
President Trump and French president Emmanuel Macron plant the Belleau Wood tree on the South Lawn in commemoration of the Battle of Belleau Wood as First Lady Melania Trump and Brigitte Macron look on in April 2018.

During French president Emmanuel Macron's 2018 state visit to the United States, President Donald Trump, First Lady Melania Trump, French President Macron and his wife Brigitte Macron planted a "European sessile oak from the Belleau Wood" on the South Lawn to commemorate the Battle of Belleau Wood. The oak was originally sprouted at the World War I Battle of Belleau Wood grounds in northern France. The tree was removed to quarantine soon after planting. The Department of Agriculture's Animal and Plant Health Inspection Service said at least two years of monitoring and testing may be required before the tree and the backup tree can be planted. The tree died in quarantine in 2019.
