= Steven W. Spandle Architect =

American architectural firm (2015-Present)

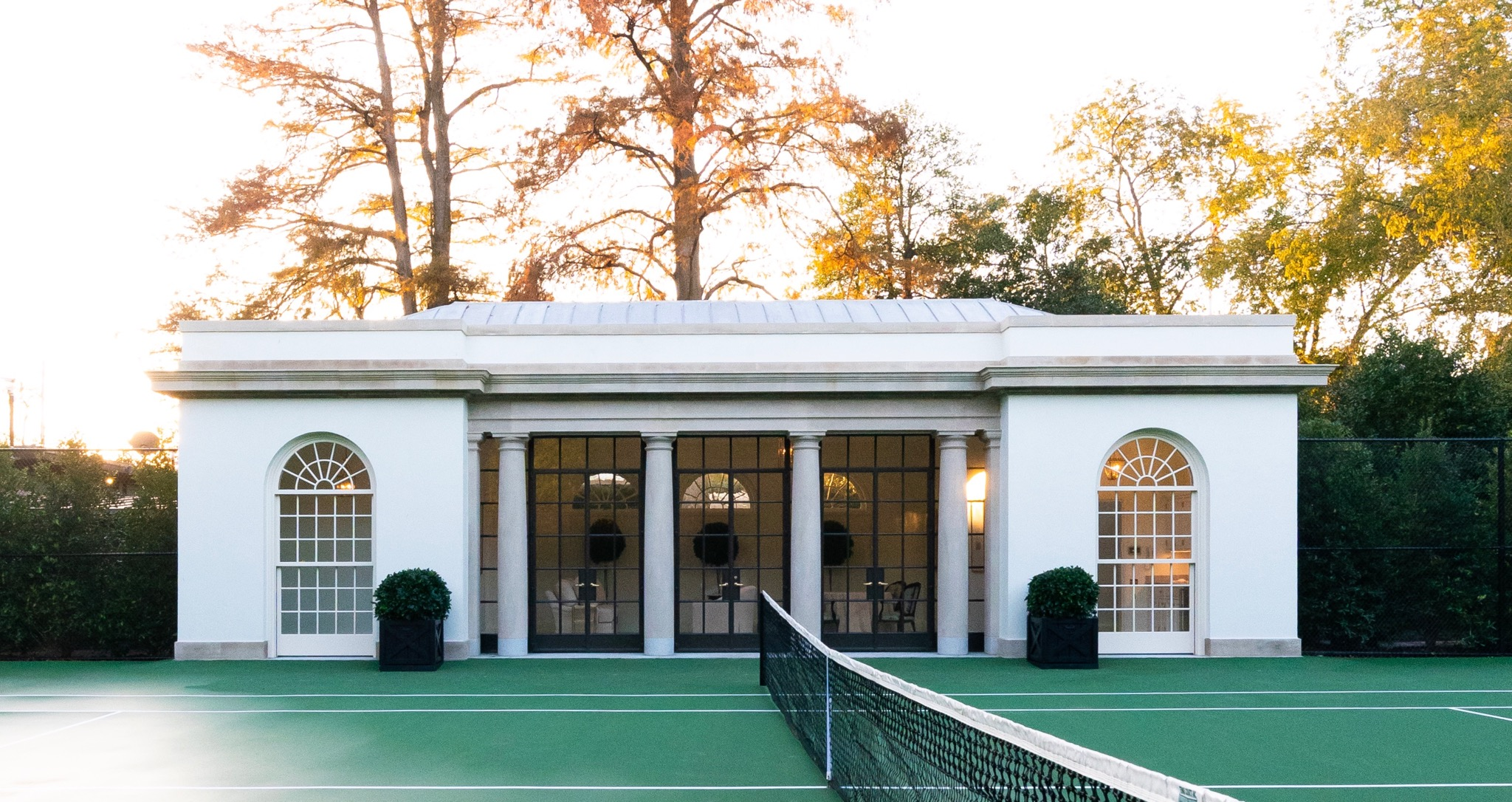
New Tennis Pavilion on the South Lawn

Steven W. Spandle Architect is the architectural firm of Steven W. Spandle. He established the firm in New York City in 2015. The firm has become known for architecting the White House Tennis Pavilion building in the year 2020, the first new free standing building on the White House grounds in decades.

== History ==
Spandle established the firm focusing on classical architecture in New York in 2015. After working on various projects he was engaged by the First Trump Administration in 2019 to design a new tennis pavilion building on the South Lawn of the White House. The project was completed in late 2020.

The firm has gone on to win multiple awards such as the Palladio Award in 2025 for architecture.
