= The Highest Court in the Land =

Basketball court in the United States Supreme Court

- Location in Washington, D.C. Location in the District of Columbia Location in the United States
- Address: 1 First Street
- Location: Washington, D.C., U.S.
- Coordinates: 38°53′26″N 77°0′16″W

The Highest Court in the Land is the basketball court located on the fifth floor of the United States Supreme Court Building. The Supreme Court of the United States is nicknamed the "highest court in the land" because it is the highest court in the federal judiciary of the United States, and the basketball court is located on a higher floor than the courtroom where the Supreme Court meets, hence the basketball court's nickname. While Supreme Court law clerks regularly play on the court, it is less common for the justices to do so. The first justice to play basketball on the court was Byron White, according to fellow justice Sandra Day O'Connor.

== Design and use ==
The ceiling of the court is 14 feet and 4 inches tall, with the floor being approximately 78 feet long and 37 feet wide, which is smaller than NBA regulation size. The floor was originally made of concrete, though a new floor was installed in 1984 and a 2015 renovation installed a "pristine" hardwood floor. The court originally had wooden backboards, though they were changed to plexiglass in 1984 or 1997. The room does not have any benches. The responsibility of maintaining the court is assigned to the Marshal of the Supreme Court. Due to the court's low ceiling, players with skill in long-range shooting are disadvantaged. The room has a warning sign which declares: "Playing basketball and weightlifting are prohibited while the Court is in session." Mike Lee, who clerked for Justice Samuel Alito in the 2006–07 term, recalled how a player dribbling would translate into "big booms" in the court chambers.

The court is not used exclusively for basketball, with other sports being played in it and an adjacent gym. Justice Hugo Black and Chief Justice William Rehnquist both used it for tennis, Justice Sandra Day O'Connor used it for aerobics, and several justices weightlifted. However, basketball is the game of choice for most. The games are mostly played by Supreme Court law clerks, though the building's security guards, cafeteria workers, librarians, and clerk's office personnel sometimes fill-in, with justices also playing infrequently. Former clerks have described the court as offering a much-needed break in a job that often requires working extremely long hours. The teams on the court are not decided by judicial philosophy or ideology.

== History ==
The Supreme Court Building, finished in 1935, featured a storage area on its fifth floor, the top floor. During the 1940s the storage area was transformed into a gymnasium, with wooden backboards being added, enabling basketball to be played. Who was responsible for this transformation and its precise date are unknown, although there is an unverified account that the transformation was suggested by Cass Gilbert Jr., the son of the building's architect. One of the gym's earliest users was Justice Hugo Black, who played tennis.

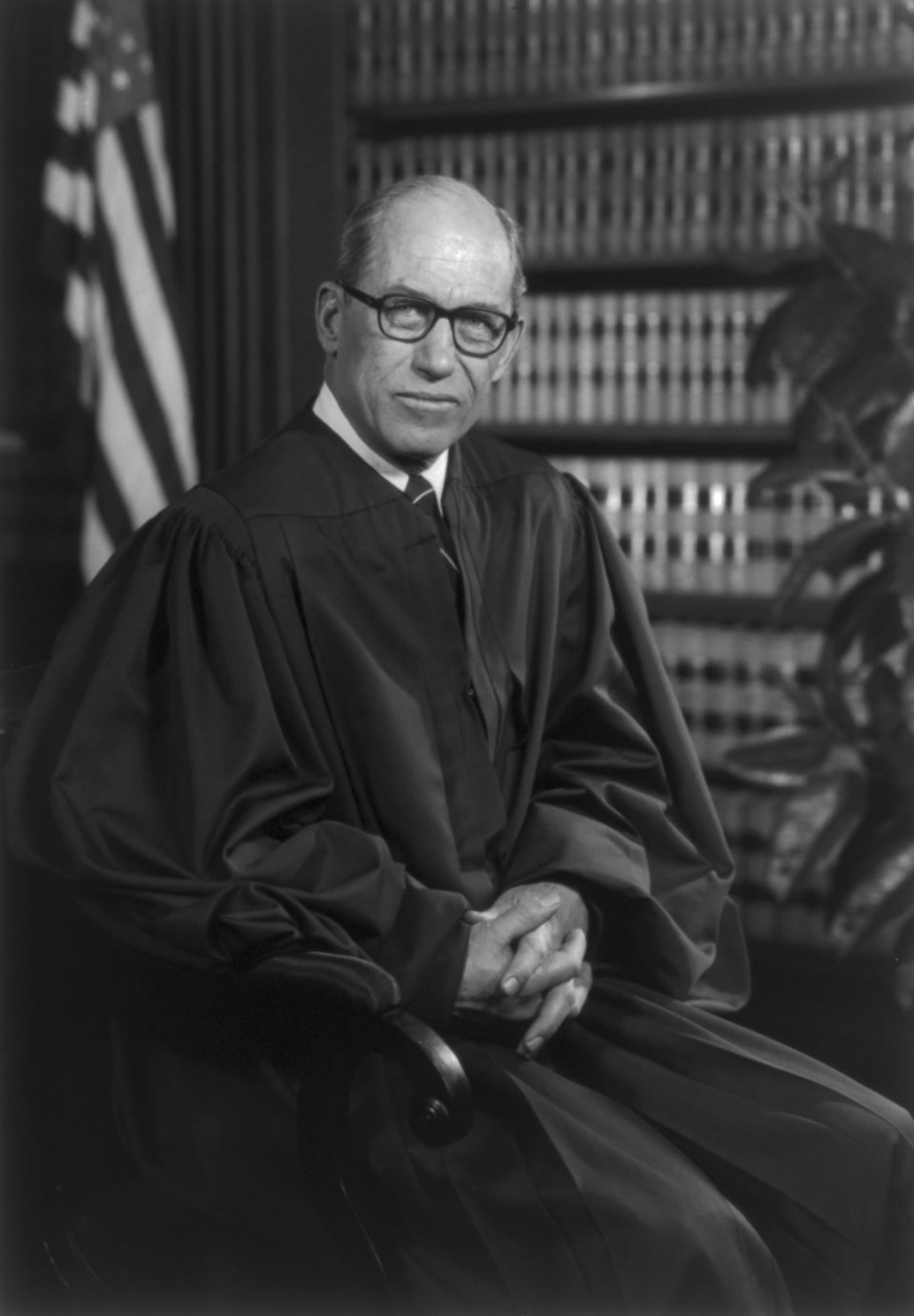
Byron White, believed to be the first Justice to play on the court

In the 1947–48 term, according to John Paul Stevens, who clerked for Justice Wiley Rutledge, a clerk for Chief Justice Fred M. Vinson, former National Football League player Byron White, was practicing layups while the Supreme Court was hearing arguments in its courtroom downstairs. The sound could be heard by the justices, and Vinson quickly directed that no basketball would be played while the Supreme Court was in session. White was appointed to the Supreme Court by John F. Kennedy in 1962 at the age of 44 and, according to Sandra Day O'Connor, became the first justice to play on the court. He took an active interest in maintaining the court and would invite his clerks to play games every afternoon, continuing to play well into his seventies. After the Supreme Court decided against the government in New York Times Co. v. United States, Solicitor General Erwin Griswold revealed that he had received reliable leaks of the Court's decisions, and intimated that it was because staff members of his were friends with some of the justices' law clerks. Chief Justice Warren E. Burger's attempts to have the FBI interrogate clerks was rebuffed, but Burger succeeded in prohibiting the clerks from scheduling basketball matches with the solicitor general's office. In 1974, clerks playing on the court had to race out of it to review filings after Watergate special prosecutor Leon Jaworski unexpectedly petitioned for certiorari in his case seeking access to the smoking gun tape.

At the end of the 1979–80 term, there was a tournament among the nine justices' law clerks, which one clerk described as a "nice diversion and distraction" during a stressful period of the year. The clerks of Justice Harry Blackmun and Chief Justice Burger made it to the final; waving a banner reading "BEAT THE CHIEF" and with Blackmun watching, his clerks were defeated on the face of a dominating performance by Burger clerk Neil Eggleston. John Roberts clerked for Rehnquist in the 1980–81 term and frequently played him on the court. Roberts described his playstyle as "forty minutes of what the hell" (a reference to Nolan Richardson's forty minutes of hell), and colleagues recalled that while he lacked skill, he had plenty of enthusiasm and played aggressively.

External image
- Ruth Bader Ginsburg playing on the court
- Instagram post by Sheryl Swoopes

The court has primarily been used by men, reflecting the hiring disparity women seeking clerkships have faced. Penda Hair, who worked for Justice Blackmun in the 1979–80 term, was initially hesitant to ask to join in; however, she recalled being "conscious of the place of women in the building and in the legal profession, so I did not think that there should be an all-male basketball game." Her male coworkers accepted her request to join in. Some women compete in all-women games, while others compete in mixed-sex games. In the 1987–88 term, Richard Cordray, who clerked for White, made sure to set up shots for his coworkers, with the Thurgood Marshall clerk Elena Kagan occasionally hitting jump shots as a result. Sandra Day O'Connor, the first woman to serve on the Supreme Court, recognized the gender disparity on the court and reserved it in the mornings to host aerobics classes, encouraging other women to attend. In 1995, O'Connor and Justice Ruth Bader Ginsburg gave a tour of the court to Team USA. During the tour, O'Connor and Team USA were able to make a field goal, but Ginsburg missed. The court is a refuge for law clerks during capital punishment cases; Noah Feldman, who clerked for Justice David Souter in the 1998–99 term, recalled how stressed clerks are during those cases, as a "human being's life is in the balance". In 2002, when the average age of the justices was 68 and with White having retired, there were no active players among the justices.

In 2017, during Neil Gorsuch's nomination hearings, Senator Ted Cruz, who clerked for Rehnquist in the 1996–97 term, asked Gorsuch, who clerked for White and Justice Anthony Kennedy in the 1993–94 term, whether he had gotten the opportunity to play with White on the court. Gorsuch replied that he had not, but that White had played some H-O-R-S-E during his clerkship. In 2018, during Brett Kavanaugh's nomination hearings, Cruz noted that no member of the Supreme Court since Justice Clarence Thomas, many years prior, had played on the court and asked Kavanaugh, who clerked for Kennedy in the 1993–94 term, whether he would play if confirmed, with Kavanaugh answering in the affirmative. On September 7, Mother Jones called the question one of the softest softball questions Kavanaugh received during his hearings.

=== Injuries ===
In the 1971–72 term, White was injured while playing on the court and had to use crutches for a few days. On one occasion, White injured his ankle after missing a rebound. He was forced off the court for a season, though his clerks gifted him a game of foosball to compensate. White sought to keep how he was injured secret. White was fiercely competitive and often elbowed his clerks and called fouls, while reportedly "bitching" when fouls were called on him. One clerk broke their foot playing against White. O'Connor recalled an occasion when White accidentally swung at a clerk, knocking him out. White was said to have picked the clerk up and, after asking if he was okay, said "Well, then get on with the game!"

In April 1993, Thomas played his first match on the court after Olympian basketball player and clerk Karl Tilleman had spent months badgering to play him. After 30 minutes of play, Thomas fell to the floor and began writhing in pain, having torn his Achilles tendon. After undergoing surgery, Thomas began hobbling around with crutches and wearing a cast, and said that his injury would not interfere with his Supreme Court duties. Thomas insisted that a photo with Tilleman be a full body shot, to show his cast, and he whispered to Tilleman "I want you to remember for the rest of your life what you did to me." Justice Anthony Kennedy asked White, who was not playing on the court at the time, whether he was responsible. White responded that "If it had been me, both his legs would've been in a cast." Sports Illustrated and O'Connor both reported that White was joking. In 2004, Thomas again injured his tendon during a game; Thomas Rex Lee recounted how Thomas, after being invited to play H-O-R-S-E as he was unable to play normal basketball after his injury, responded "Supreme Court justices don't play H-O-R-S-E, they play habeas corpus."

In the 1987–88 term, there were a large numbers of injuries and Rehnquist frequently had to find substitutes for his doubles tennis matches. One of those injured that term was clerk Elena Kagan, who landed on the floor awkwardly and had to go to the hospital. When O'Connor saw Kagan hobbling she remarked that "it would not have happened in aerobics." Goodwin Liu, who clerked for Ginsburg in the 2000–01 term, recalled running into a large Scalia clerk and spraining his ankle.

== See also ==
- White House tennis court
