= Flags at the White House =

Flags displayed at the White House

Coordinates: 38.89769°N 77.03656°W

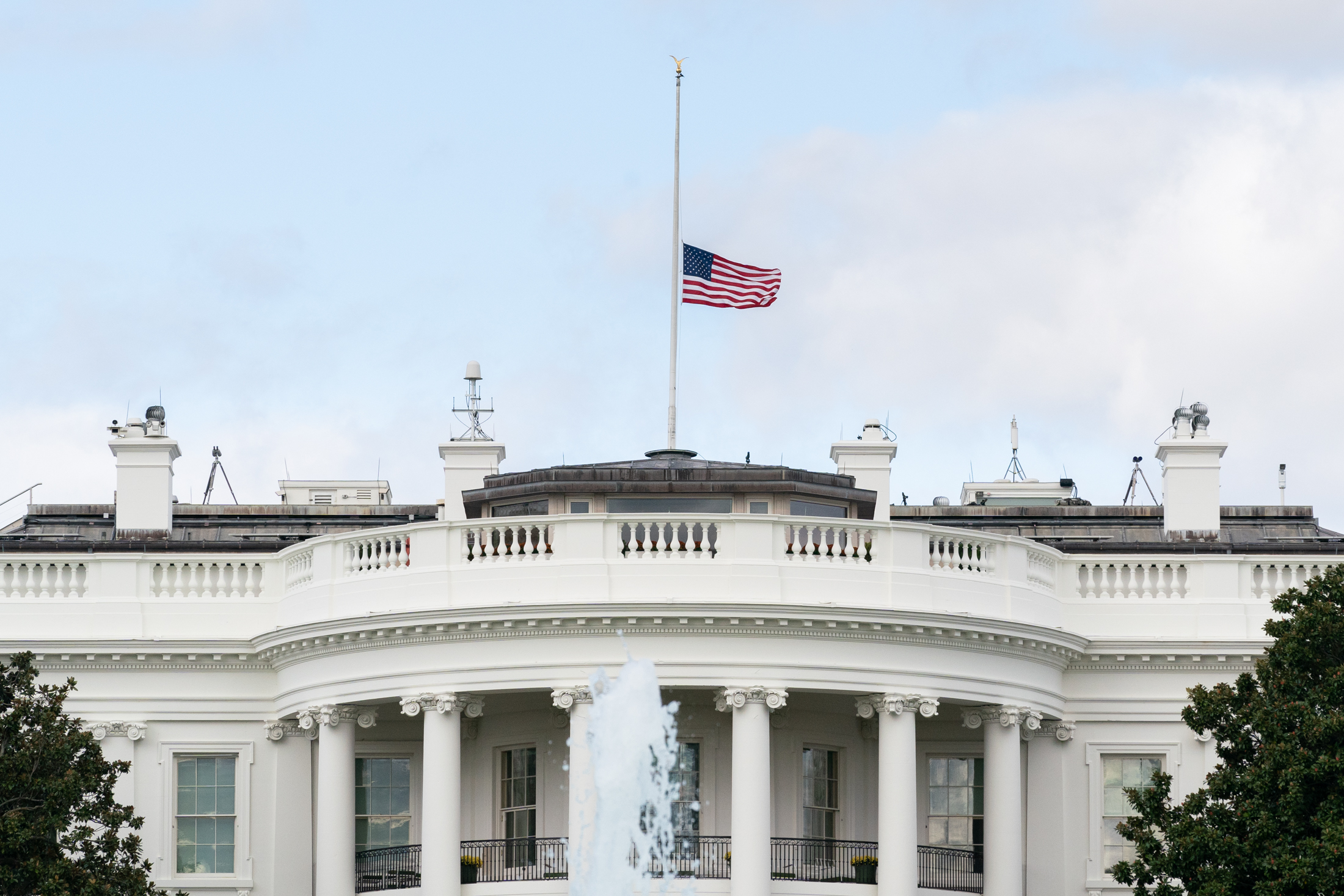
The U.S. flag atop the White House flying at half-staff in 2019

The White House and its Executive Residence, the official home of the president of the United States, flies the U.S. flag from a flagpole on its rooftop. The U.S. flag is flown there at all times, and since 2019, the POW/MIA flag as well. Flagpoles on the North and South Lawns were installed in 2025.

== History ==
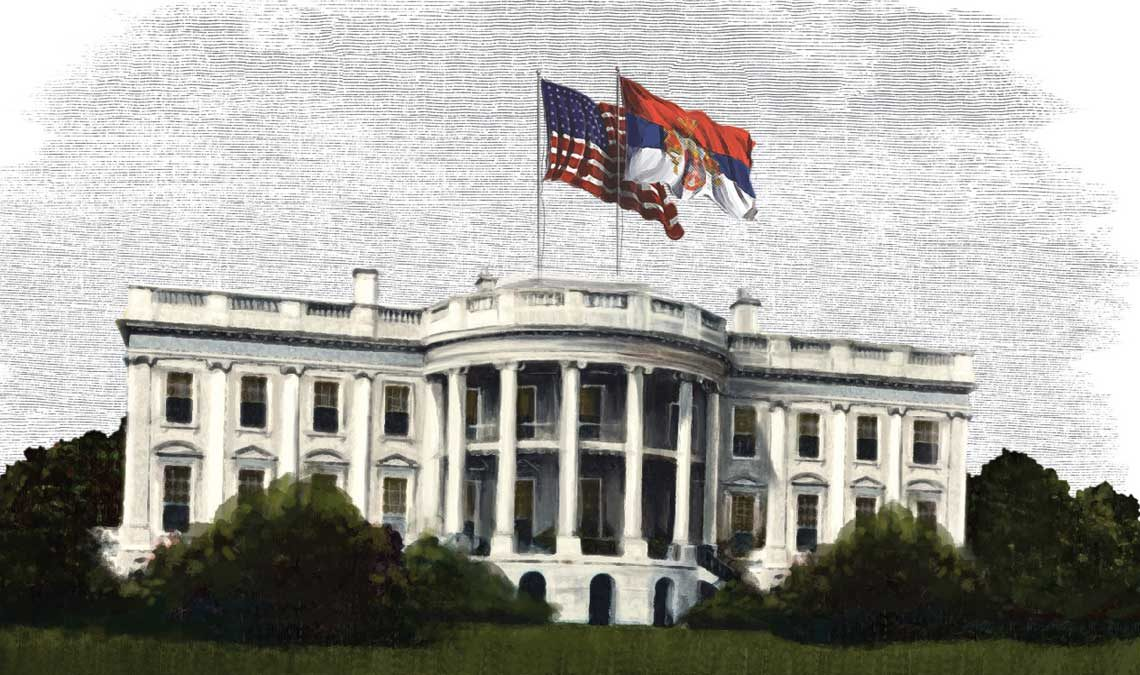
Artistic depiction of a July 1918 event in which a Serbian flag was flown over the White House alongside the U.S. one in a show of wartime solidarity; the only non-U.S. flags to have ever been flown over the White House are those of Serbia and France.

As the official residence of the U.S. head of state, the White House, on its rooftop flagpole, permanently displays the United States' national flag. That U.S. flag is not lowered or removed from the flagpole when the U.S. president departs from the building's premises, but remains flying. This has been the case since September 1970, when U.S. president Richard Nixon mandated this practice on the suggestion of his wife and the U.S. first lady, Pat Nixon.

Aside from the U.S. flag, other flags have occasionally been flown from the rooftop flagpole on the White House. The only foreign national flags to have been flown there are those of Serbia and France, the former flown alongside the U.S. flag in July 1918 as a show of solidarity by the United States towards the Serbian people during World War I, and the latter done in July 1920 to commemorate the French Bastille Day.

The U.S. flag displayed on the rooftop flagpole on top of the White House is often lowered to half-staff on the direction of the U.S. president to commemorate a certain occasion or object, such as a person or persons significant to the United States who have recently died (such as prominent political figures and members of Congress).

However, the rooftop national flag is never replaced with the presidential standard, even when the U.S. president is in the residence (unlike what happens at Buckingham Palace in the UK, for example).

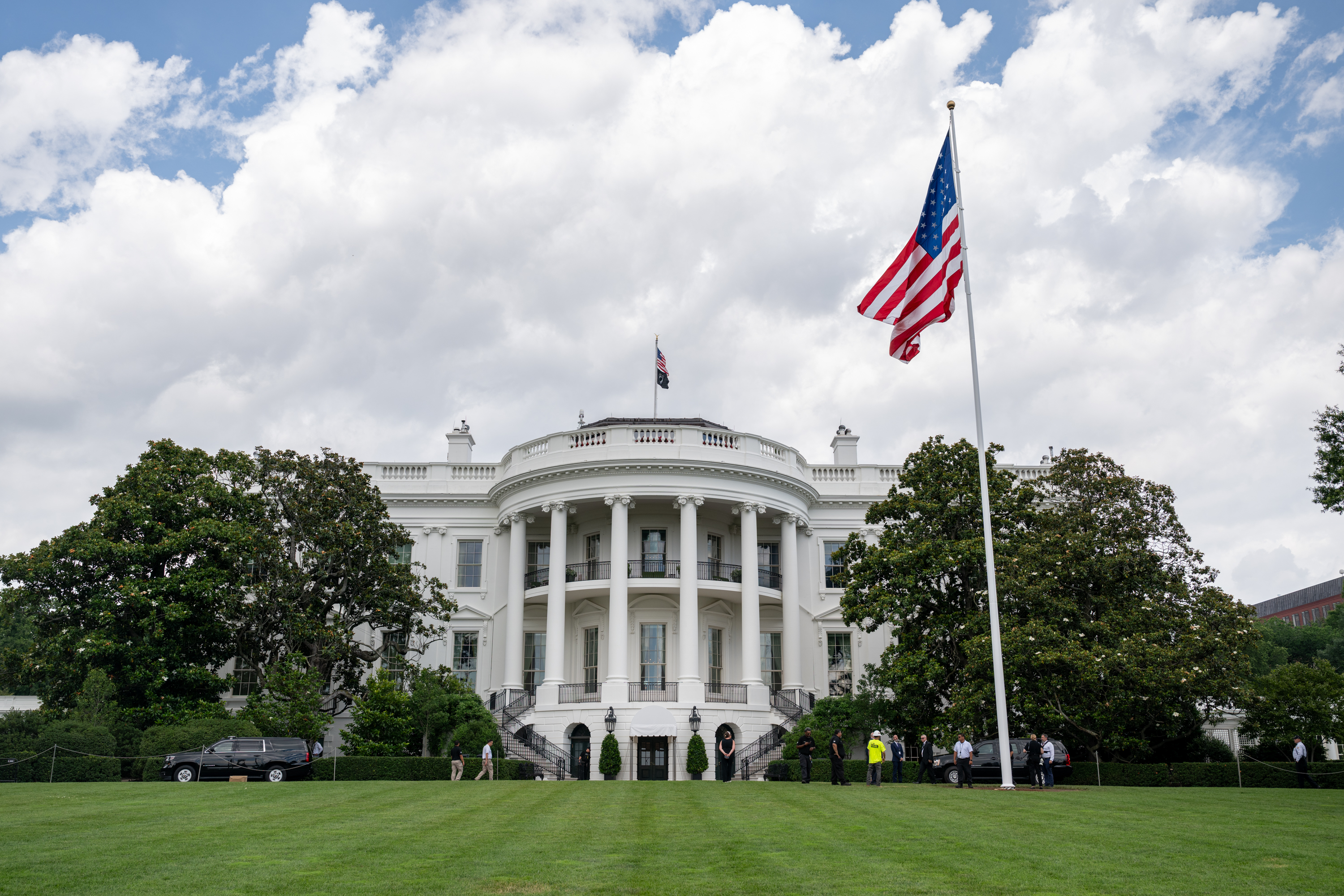
The flagpole on the South Lawn after being installed.

On June 18, 2025, President Donald Trump had an 88-foot flagpole (27 m) installed on each of the White House lawns, each flying a large American flag, reportedly spending $100,000 as a personal contribution to the White House.

== See also ==
- Flags at Buckingham Palace
