= King's Flag Sergeant =

The King/Queen's Flag Sergeant is a serving soldier and member of the Master of the Household's Department in the British Royal Household.

The post is filled by a serving non-commissioned officer from the Household Division Brigade of Guards for a period usually of two years. The current position is held by Lance Sergeant Oliver Morton who assumed the role in 2022.

He is responsible for raising and lowering the Royal Standard from Buckingham Palace when the Sovereign is in residence and (since 1997) doing the same for the Union Flag when (s)he is not in residence. The various flags used at the Palace and vehicles from the palace are stored in the Flag Sergeant's office.

He is also responsible for despatching Royal Standards to places the Monarch is visiting at home or abroad. On a day-to-day basis within Buckingham Palace, the Flag Sergeant performs courier services from the Palace's post office and assists with other liveried duties.

== See also ==
- "Yeoman of the Round Tower" at Windsor Castle.
- Foot Guards
