= Lockheed Martin Systems Integration – Owego =

Lockheed Martin Systems Integration – Owego (LMSI) was a subsidiary of Lockheed Martin, in the Electronic Systems sector, located in Owego, New York, with approximately 2,500 employees. It used to be known as Lockheed Martin Federal Systems.

Founded as IBM Federal Systems in 1957, it was sold to Loral Corporation in 1994, becoming Loral Federal Systems. Lockheed Martin acquired Loral's electronic systems and systems integration business in 1996.

In 2010, Systems Integration was dissolved and merged with Lockheed Martin Rotary and Mission Systems, with some of the then-current programs transferred to Lockheed Martin Missiles and Fire Control, and received programs from other Lockheed Martin locations that were shuttered at that time.

Since being acquired by Lockheed Martin in 2015, the Owego location performs work from the new Sikorsky line of business, which complements the helicopter work that has historically occurred there.

== Projects ==
- Mission System integration for the Romeo and Sierra models of the US Navy MH-60 variant of the Sikorsky SH-60 Seahawk
- Electronics upgrades to the B-52 Stratofortress and A-10 Thunderbolt II
- Provisioning of digital capture technologies, recognition via Artificial Intelligence programming and tracking materials to the United States Postal Service.
- Airport scanners for detecting explosives.
- VH-71 Kestrel, a Marine One replacement (cancelled in 2009)
- VH-92, a Marine One replacement
- Mission System integration for the US Air Force Combat Rescue Helicopter
