= HMX-1 =

Marine Helicopter Squadron 1
- HMX-1 insignia
- Founded: December 1, 1947
- Country: United States
- Branch: United States Marine Corps
- Type: Medium Helicopter Squadron
- Role: VIP Transport; Operational Testing and Evaluation
- Part of: Headquarters Marine Corps
- Garrison/HQ: Marine Corps Air Facility Quantico
- Nicknames: "The Nighthawks", "Marine One"

Commanders
- Current commander: Col Vanessa M. Clark
- Notable commanders: Keith B. McCutcheon; Edward C. Dyer

Marine Helicopter Squadron One (HMX-1) is a United States Marine Corps helicopter squadron responsible for the transportation of the president and vice president of the United States, heads of state, Department of Defense officials, and other VIPs as directed by the Marine Corps and White House Military Office. A Marine helicopter with the president aboard uses the call sign "Marine One". Previously, HMX-1 was also tasked with operational test and evaluation (OT&E). This task was reassigned to VMX-1 in Yuma, Arizona; since the contract award of the new presidential helicopter in 2014 to Sikorsky Aircraft. However, HMX-1 assumed the temporary role of OT&E for the designated aircraft, because of its unique nature and mission as the transport of important people for the U.S. government. The VH-92A first flew in 2017 and became operational in 2024. Nicknamed "Nighthawks", HMX-1 is headquartered at Marine Corps Air Facility Quantico, Virginia, and maintains detachments at Joint Base Anacostia–Bolling in Washington, D.C., and Joint Base Andrews Naval Air Facility in Maryland.

== History ==
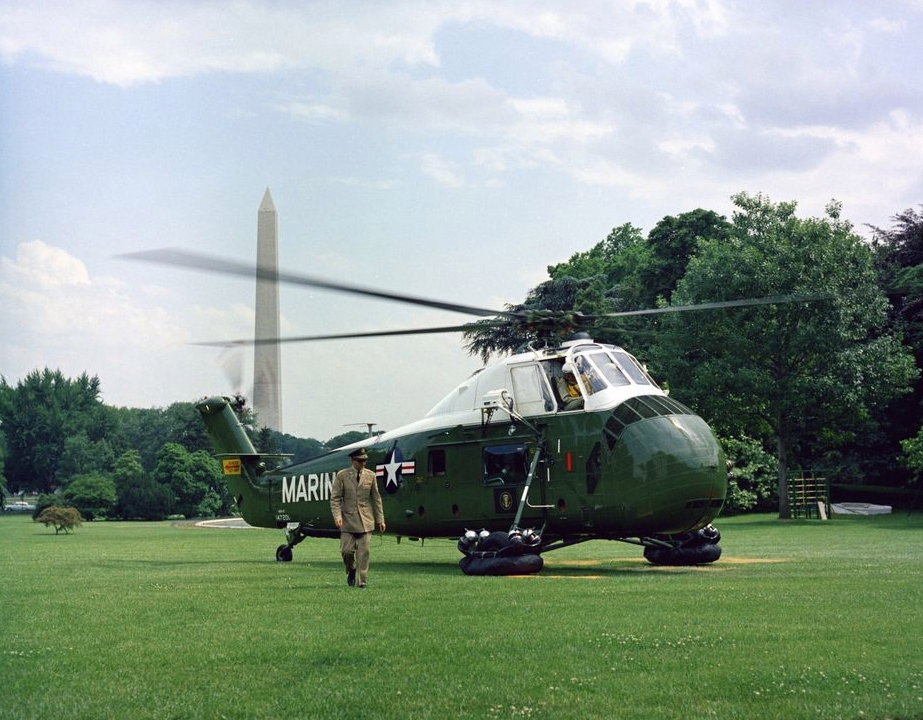
A VH-34D presidential helicopter (BuNo 147201) on the South Lawn of the White House in 1961

In 1946, General Roy S. Geiger observed the atomic bomb tests at Bikini Atoll and instantly recognized that atomic bombs could render amphibious landings difficult because of the dense concentrations of troops, ships, and material at the beachhead. The commandant of the Marine Corps convened a special board, the Hogaboom Board, that recommended that the Marine Corps develop transport helicopters in order to allow a more diffuse attack on enemy shores. It also recommended that they stand up an experimental helicopter squadron. HMX-1 was commissioned on 1 December 1947 under the command of Colonel Edward C. Dyer and based at MCAS Quantico, Virginia, because of its relative proximity to the Sikorsky and Piasecki plants in Connecticut, and to the Marine Corps schools where most of the original personnel would come from. They operated the Sikorsky HO3S-1 and the Piasecki HRP-1 and saw their first test of capabilities in May of that year when five squadron aircraft transported 66 Marines from the deck of the USS Palau (CVE-122) to Marine Corps Base Camp Lejeune, North Carolina. While the test aircraft could only carry three Marines each and required multiple trips, it did indicate the possibilities of the concept. In 1948 the Marine Corps Schools came out with Amphibious Operations - Employment of Helicopters (Tentative) or Phib-31 which was the first manual for airmobile operations. The Marines used the term "vertical envelopment" instead of "air mobility" or "air assault". HMX-1 performed the first ship-to-shore movement of troops from the deck of an aircraft carrier in an exercise in May 1948.

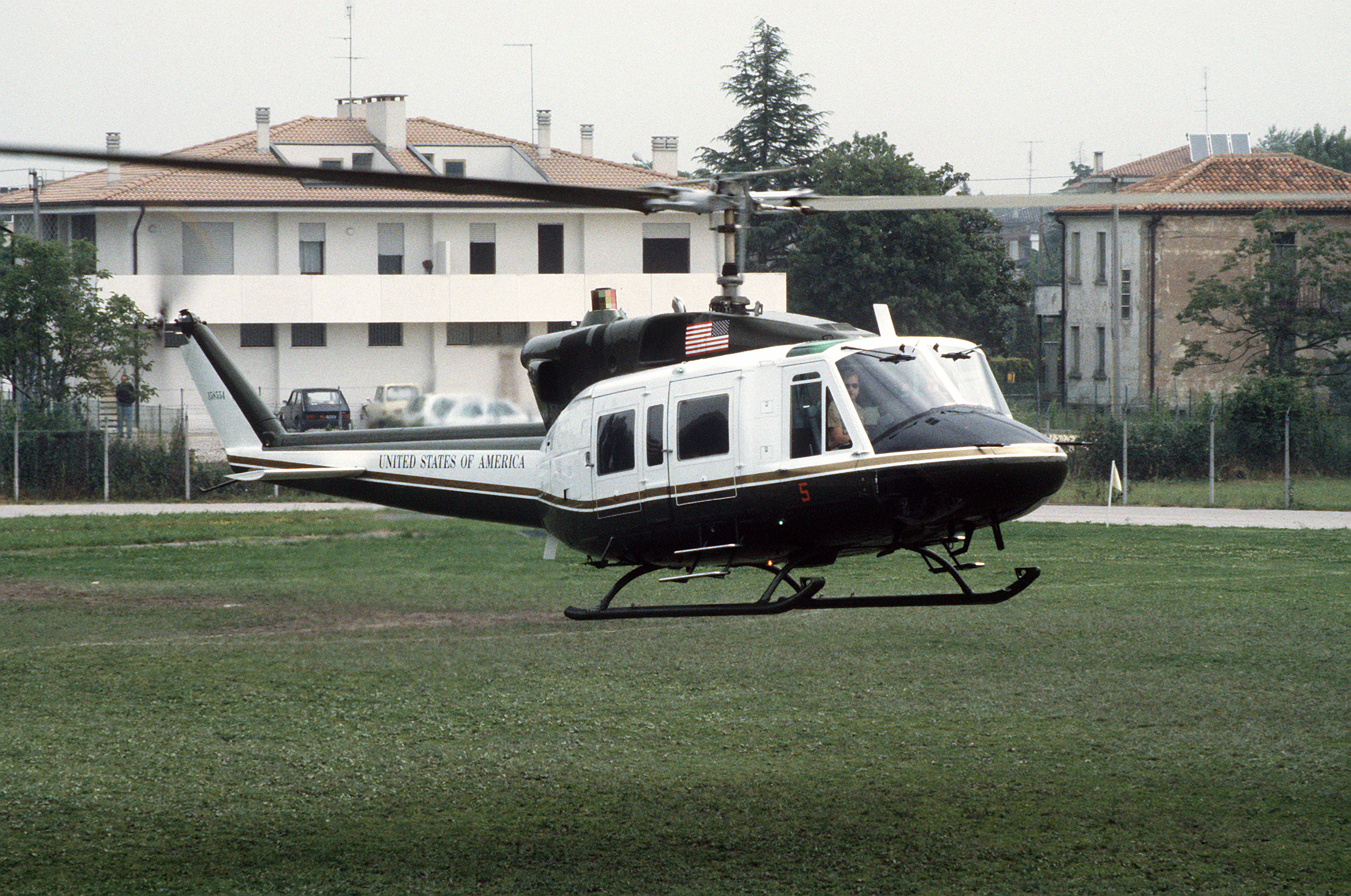
VH-1N with President Ronald Reagan at the G7 in Italy in 1987

After the start of the Korean War, four HMX-1 helicopters were attached to VMO-6 and sent to help the 1st Provisional Marine Brigade at the Battle of Pusan Perimeter in 1950. They were used for battlefield observation and control as well as medical evacuation and the rescue of fliers. During the Chosin campaign they were used for liaison between the different Marine units strung along the western edge of the Chosin Reservoir. The requirements of the Korean War exceeded the Navy's training requirement thus HMX-1 was pressed into service as a training command for the first few years of the war. They trained the nucleus of pilots that would form HMR-161, the first Marine helicopter transport squadron.

On 7 September 1957, President Dwight D. Eisenhower was vacationing in Newport, Rhode Island, when his immediate presence was needed at the White House. The president was required at the White House to deal with the "Little Rock Nine" crisis stemming from Arkansas Gov. Orval Faubus ordering the Arkansas National Guard to block black students from attending Central High School. President Eisenhower responded by sending the 101st Airborne into Little Rock to enforce the Brown vs. Topeka Board of Education desegregation ruling handed down by the U.S. Supreme Court in May 1954.

Typically, the return trip to Washington, D.C., required an hour-long ferry ride across Narragansett Bay to Air Force One at the Quonset Point Naval Air Station, followed by a 45-minute flight to Andrews Air Force Base, Maryland, and a 20-minute motorcade ride to the White House. Realizing the urgent need for his presence in Washington, President Eisenhower directed his staff to find a faster way to Air Force One.

An HMX-1 UH-34 helicopter was on Aquidneck Island in case of an emergency and could be used to fly the president to his awaiting aircraft. President Eisenhower approved the idea, and Col. Virgil D. Olson and his crew were ordered to rush to a landing pad at the Naval War College at Newport, where the president and Mrs. Eisenhower were staying during their vacation. Col. Olson reported making the flight to the waiting Air Force One across Narragansett Bay in a 6-minute flight.

Thus, a precedent was set. Col. Olson became the first presidential helicopter pilot and commander of a greatly expanded HMX-1 squadron. He served at the pleasure of the president for almost three years before continuing his service in Korea and Vietnam and at the Pentagon. President Eisenhower invited Col. Olson to join him at a White House luncheon in 1959 at which Col. Olson was required to convince the president he should be allowed to pursue his career beyond the limits of the Marine One assignment. President Eisenhower reluctantly agreed to Col. Olson's request. Because of his historic role and his long involvement with the HMX-1 Squadron and Marine One operations, the squadron's new facility at Marine Base Quantico, Va., was dedicated in honor of Col. Olson (1919–2012) on 12 August 2010. Col. Olson spoke at the dedication of the facility, a rarity for named Marine facilities throughout the world, most of which recognize deceased Marines.

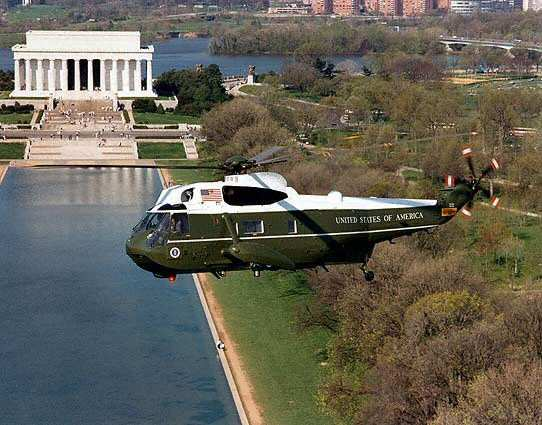
A VH-3D Sea King flying over Washington, D.C.

Shortly after the 7 September 1957, mission from Newport, a naval aide to the president asked HMX-1 to evaluate landing helicopters on the South Lawn of the White House. Preliminary assessment and trial flights concluded that ample room was present for a safe landing and departure. Formal procedures were finalized and HMX-1 began a long career of flying the president of the United States to and from the South Lawn and Andrews AFB, the home of Air Force One. Col. Olson is credited with initiating many of the procedures which are now standard operating procedure, including painting the top of the otherwise Marine green helicopters white, thus their "White Top" nickname. It also was Col. Olson who conceived the placement of the large white circular target at a predetermined spot on the White House lawn for the nose of Marine One on landing, a function necessitated when the White House gardener complained to Col. Olson that the rotor craft were destroying the trees, shrubs, and flowers on the South Lawn.

Initially, the helicopter function was shared with the Army, but in 1976, the Marine Corps was assigned the sole responsibility and mission of providing helicopter support to the president worldwide. Today HMX-1 also supports the vice president, secretary of defense, secretary of the Navy, commandant of the Marine Corps, and all visiting heads of state in the Washington, D.C., area.

On 16 July 2009, Marine One flew with an all-female crew for the first time, as the final flight of the first woman to fly the president: Major Jennifer Grieves.

== Aircraft ==
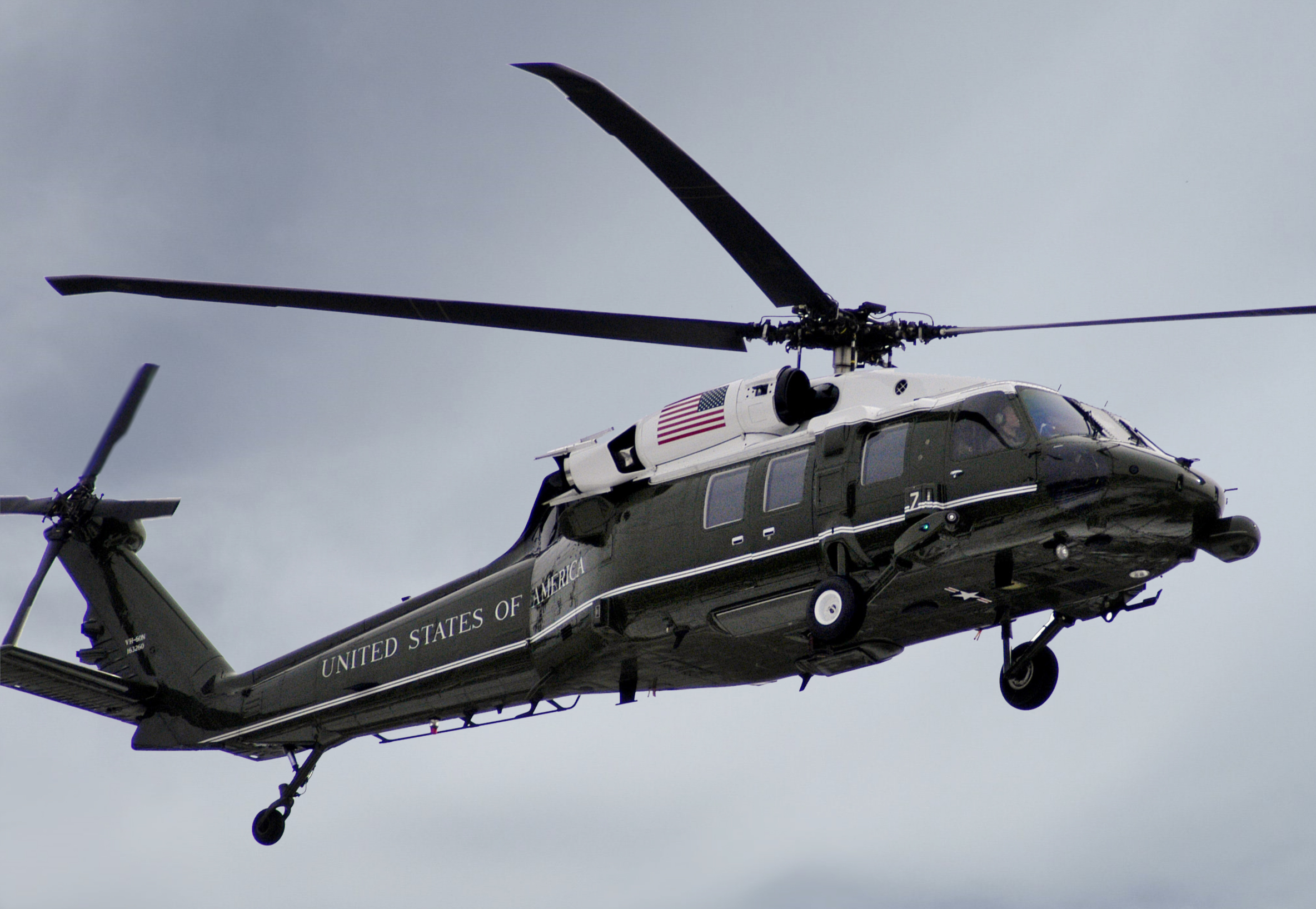
A VH-60N Whitehawk flies over the Potomac River in Washington, D.C.

The first official presidential helicopter was the VH-34 Choctaw, beginning operations in September 1957, and replaced by the VH-3A Sea King beginning in 1962. In the late 1970s, the VH-3As were retired and replaced by the upgraded VH-3D. The current fleet is made up of the VH-3D, the VH-60N "Whitehawk", which entered service with the squadron in 1988, the VH-92, and the MV-22.

The V designates the aircraft as configured for use by VIPs. The Executive Flight Detachment is the only Marine Corps unit to operate these Sikorsky aircraft. The VH-3D is capable of transporting 14 passengers, as is the VH-92, while the VH-60N only seats 11. All 3 helicopters require a pilot, copilot, and crew chief, but only the VH-60N and VH-92 also require a communications systems operator. Because the VH-60N folds easily for loading into an Air Force C-5 Galaxy or a C-17 Globemaster it is ideal for overseas assignments. The Marines can prepare a VH-60N for a C-5 load in less than two hours.

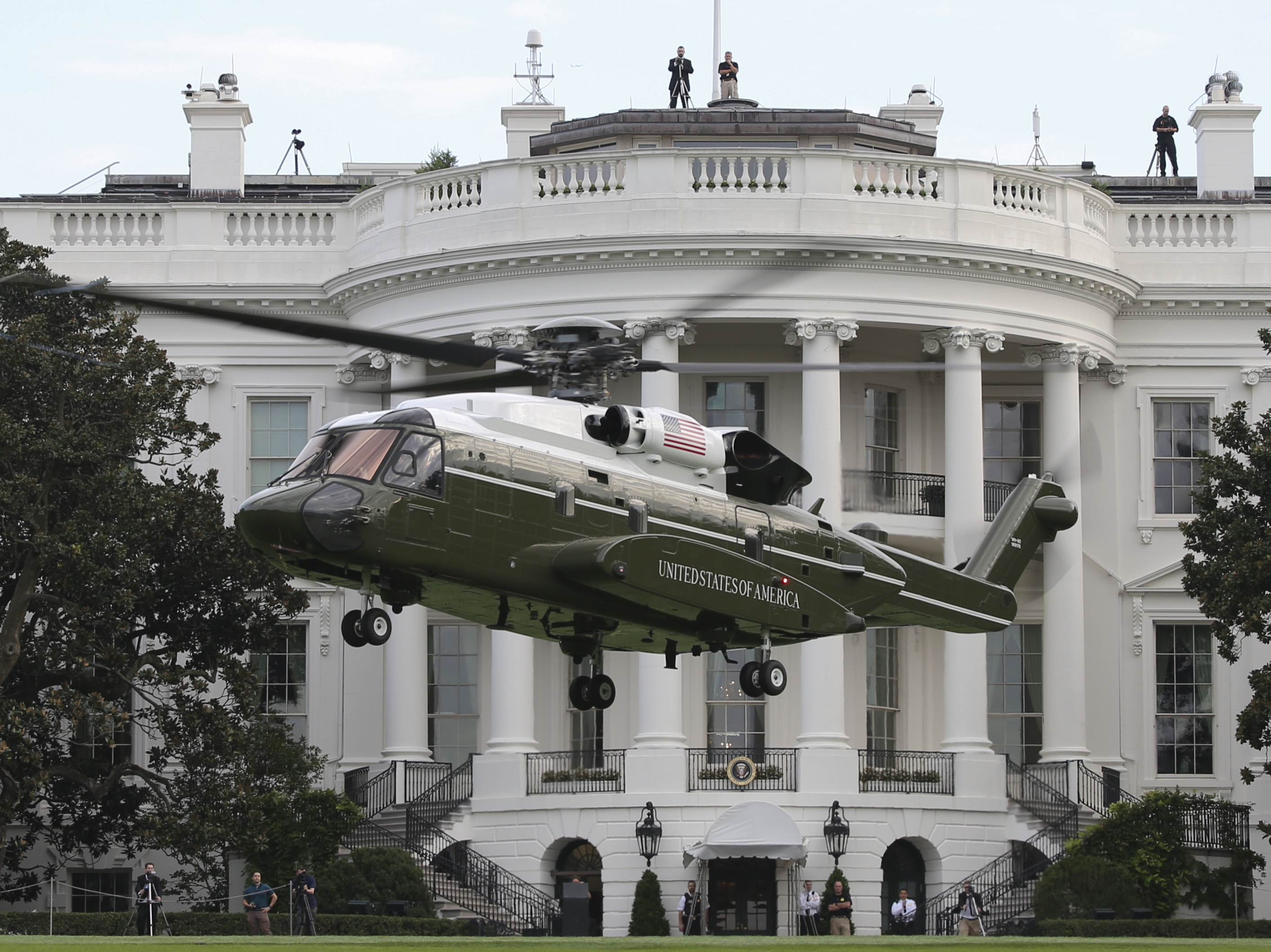
A VH-92A conducts landing tests, White House South Lawn in 2018

Due to the uniqueness of the VIP transport platforms, denoted by the VH prefix, all pilots and maintenance personnel assigned to these aircraft are trained by Sikorsky factory-trained instructors. Depending on the Military Occupational Specialty, these schools can range from 1 to 5 months and are taught at the squadron. Sikorsky technical representatives oversee the Marines' operation and maintenance of the aircraft.

HMX-1 was scheduled to receive 23 new Lockheed Martin VH-71 Kestrel helicopters to replace the current fleet. However, in April 2009, it was announced that the Kestrel program was cancelled over budget concerns. The VXX program was restarted in 2010 and the Sikorsky VH-92 won the competition in 2014. Final delivery of VH-92's to the unit was completed in 2024. HMX-1 also formerly operated a small number of CH-46 Sea Knights for utility purposes and a fleet of CH-53E Super Stallions. These aircraft were replaced with MV-22B Ospreys by 2017. The MV-22's share the dark green livery that is characteristic of HMX-1, but they lack the white painted top which gained the other aircraft the nickname "white tops". On 11 August 2013 two MV-22 Ospreys made their presidential debut ferrying Secret Service agents, White House staff, and members of the media from CGAS Cape Cod to Martha's Vineyard during the president's vacation.
In 2024, the VH-92 Patriot replaced the VH-3D as the Marine One helicopter. and HMX-1 operated a fleet of 10 Sikorsky VH-3Ds, 6 Sikorsky VH-60Ns, 9 Sikorsky VH-92s and 12 Bell-Boeing MV-22 Ospreys. The VH-3Ds remained for White House flights because the newer VH-92s' more powerful rotor wash burnt and uprooted the South Lawn landing zone creating hazardous debris, until September 2026, when the South Lawn helipad was built and the VH-3Ds destined for retirement.

== Executive Flight Detachment ==
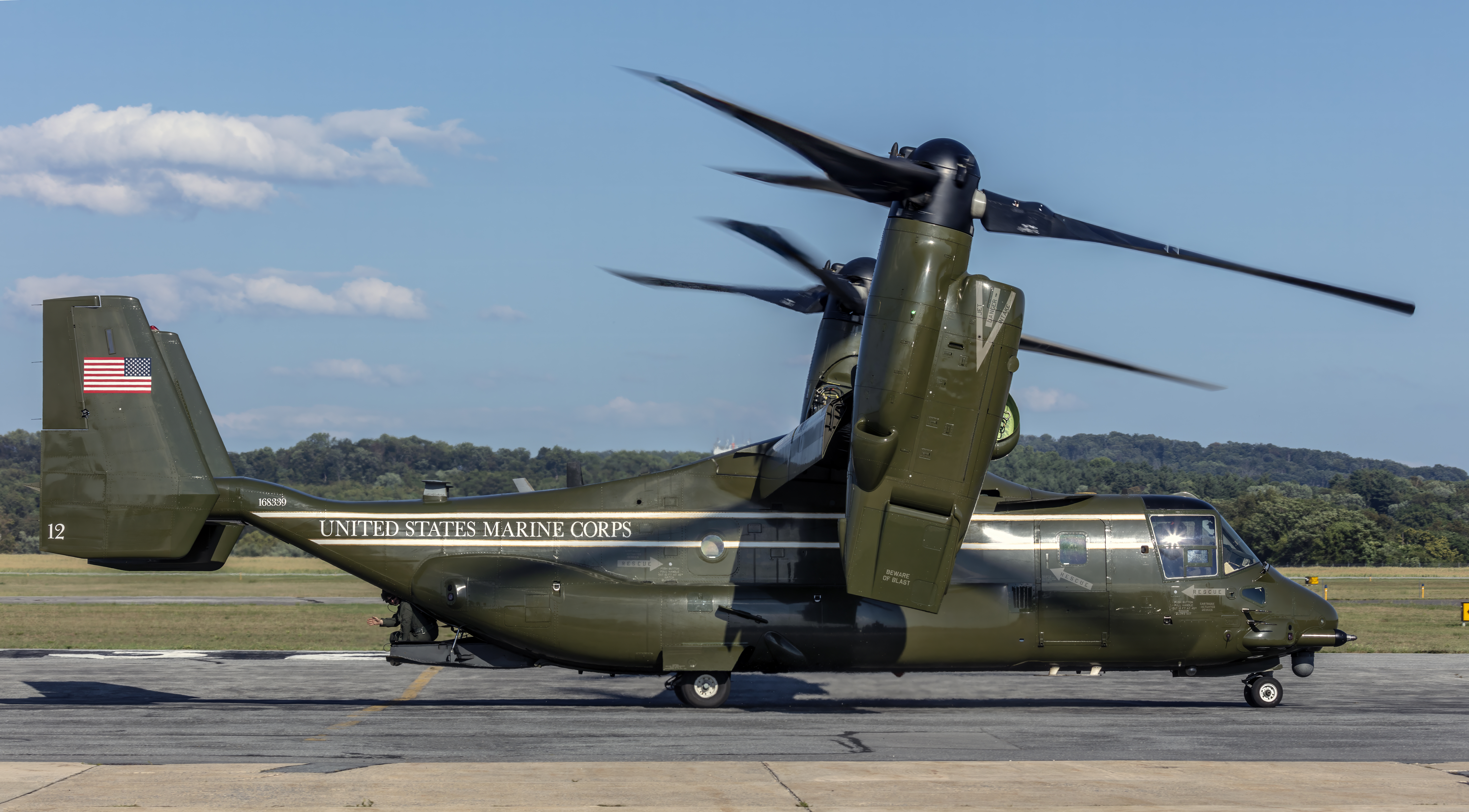
A MV-22B of HMX-1 Executive Flight, supporting the Camp David summit, of U.S. president Biden, South Korean president Yoon Suk Yeol, and Japanese prime minister Fumio Kishida, in Maryland

The presidential and VIP flights are conducted by "Whiteside", the Executive Flight Detachment. Most activities of Whiteside are directed by the White House Military Office. Whiteside, although based at Quantico, Virginia, operates extensively out of an adjunct facility at Joint Base Anacostia-Bolling in Washington, D.C.

Operations by "Greenside", which is the rest of HMX-1, include operational test and evaluation, such as with the V-22, a vertical take-off and landing tiltrotor aircraft, and support of exercises and training evolutions for the Marine Corps Combat Development Command at Marine Corps Base Quantico, Virginia.

The "X" in its squadron designator originally stood for Experimental, emblematic of its original mission of testing new helicopters and flight systems. However, as its operational role in VIP transportation overshadowed its operational test and evaluation role, the "Experimental" moniker was dropped, although the squadron designator was left unchanged.

Marines who fly in the Executive Flight Detachment may be eligible for the Presidential Service Badge after a certain term of service.

== See also ==
- 89th Airlift Wing
- United States Secret Service
- United States Marine Corps Aviation
- List of active United States Marine Corps aircraft squadrons
- List of decommissioned United States Marine Corps aircraft squadrons
