= VXX =

Procurement program to replace aging Marine One helicopters

Presidential Helicopter Replacement Program (VXX)
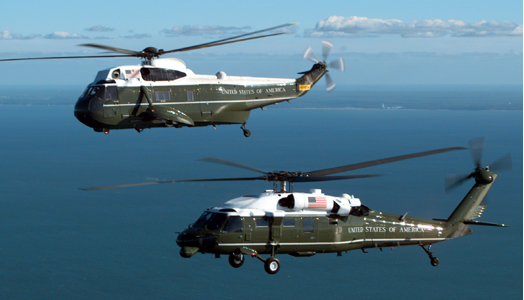
- A Sikorsky VH-3D Sea King and VH-60N

General information
- Project for: Presidential transport helicopter
- Issued by: United States Navy
- Service: United States Marine Corps
- Proposals: Lockheed Martin US-101; Sikorsky VH-92
- Prototypes: Lockheed Martin VH-71 Kestrel; Sikorsky VH-92
- Requirement: VXX Mission Needs Statement (September 16, 1999)

History
- Initiated: December 18, 2003 (RFP)
- Concluded: April 6, 2009
- Outcome: Round 1: Lockheed Martin VH-71 Kestrel selected for production, but result protested, VH-71 canceled Round 2: Sikorsky VH-92 Patriot

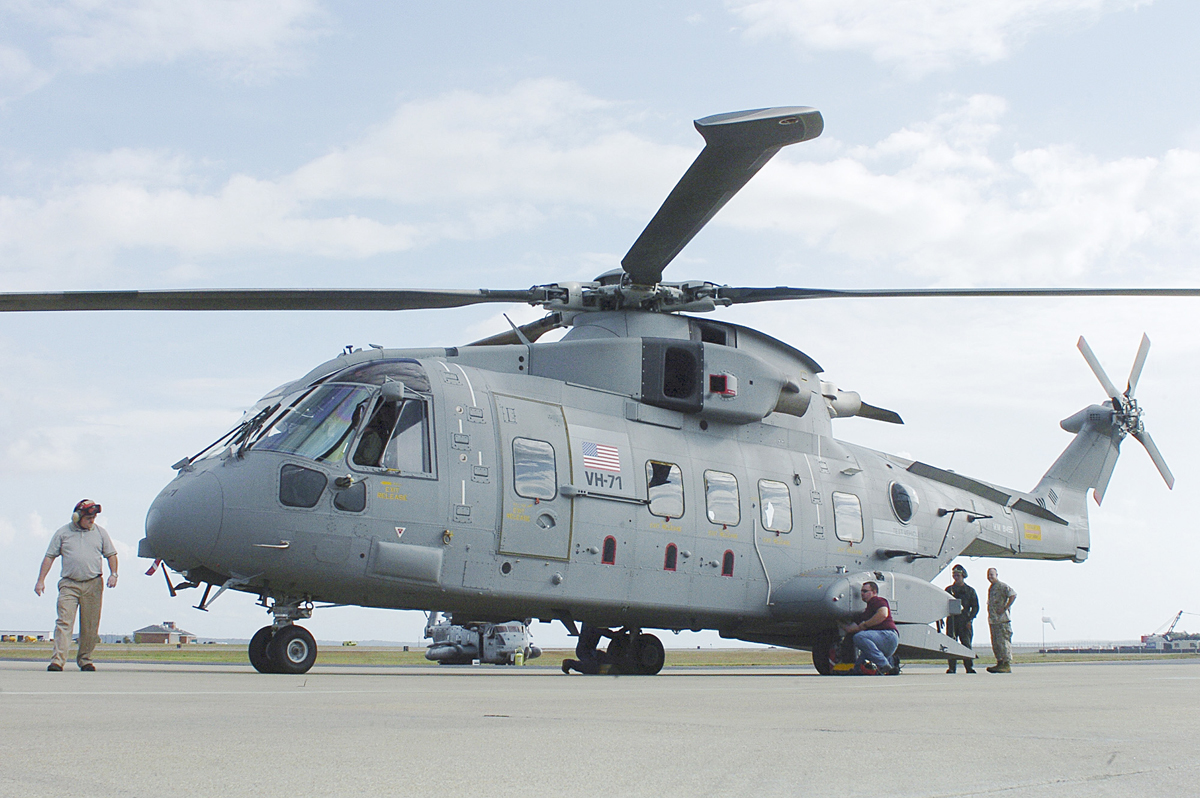
A VH-71 test aircraft at Marine Corps Air Facility Quantico, October 2005

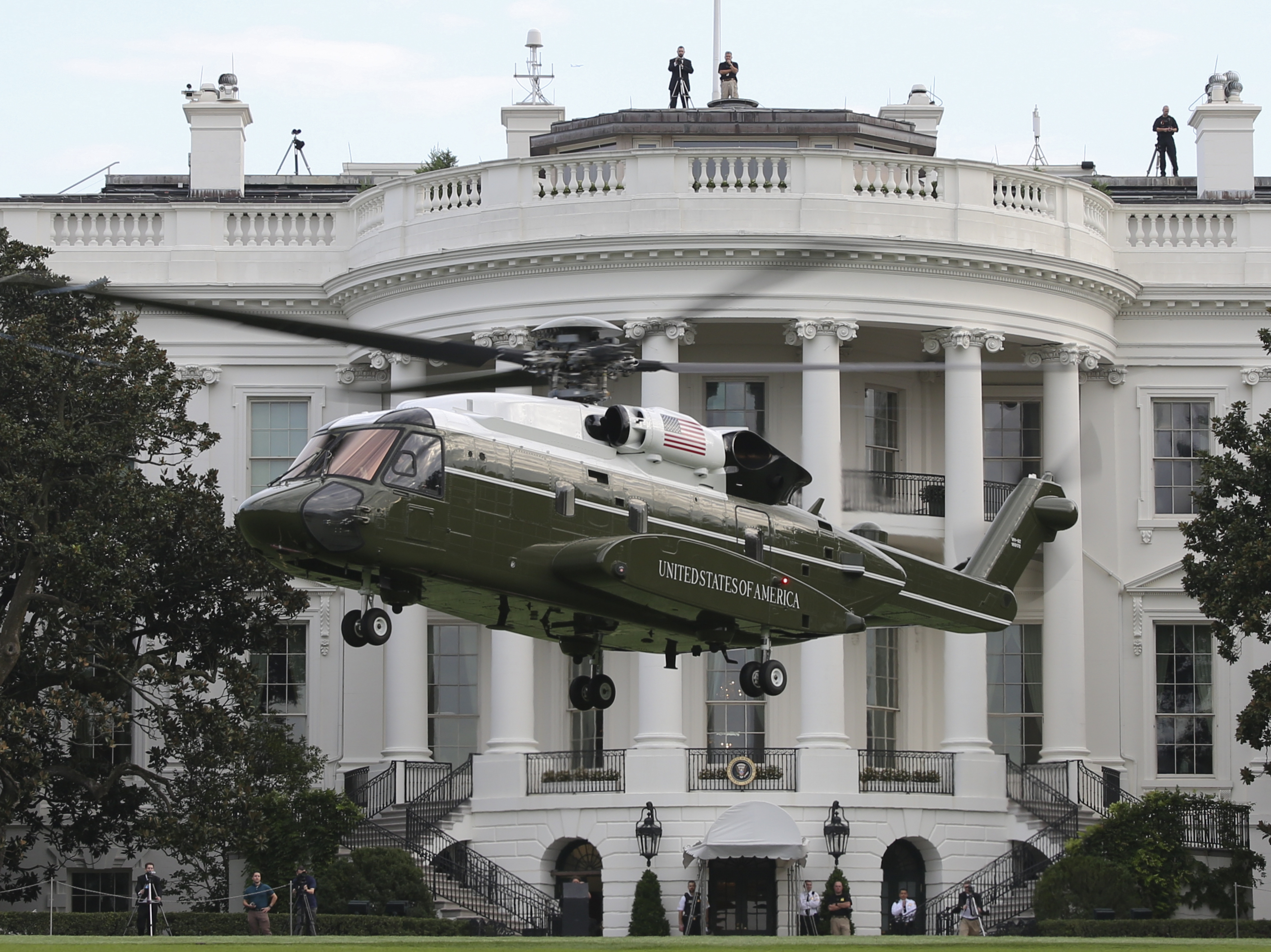
A developmental Sikorsky VH-92A helicopter conducts landing and take-off testing at the White House South Lawn in September 2018

VXX, officially the Presidential Helicopter Replacement Program, was a procurement program to replace aging Marine One helicopters that transport the president of the United States. The previous VH-3 helicopters had aging airframes, having entered service with United States Marine Corps Marine Helicopter Squadron One (HMX-1) in 1963. The VH-3D replaced the VH-3A by 1976. The smaller VH-60N entered service in 1987. On 7 May 2014, it was announced that the Sikorsky VH-92 had won the VXX competition.

== History ==
The September 11 attacks on the U.S. led to widespread agreement that the Marine One helicopter fleet needed significant upgrades to its communication, transportation, and security systems. But these could not be made due to the weight already added to the aircraft. In 2002, it was proposed to replace the current helicopters. The U.S. Department of Defense issued a request for proposals (RFP) for the VXX helicopter on 18 December 2003 for the supply of 23 helicopters to replace the eleven VH-3Ds and eight VH-60Ns of USMC HMX-1 squadron. In November 2002, the White House asked the Secretary of Defense to accelerate the development of the new aircraft, and DOD said it would have a new aircraft ready by the end of 2008. To do so, DOD asked bidders to begin development and production at the same time.

AgustaWestland and Sikorsky responded to the RFP. Sikorsky proposed the VH-92, a variant of the H-92 Superhawk. On January 28, 2005 the Department of Defense announced that it had selected the US101 for the VXX program. The US101 team was awarded a US$1.7 billion contract for the VXX system development and demonstration (SDD) phase. The Lockheed Martin and AgustaWestland AW101-based US101 bid was given the military designation VH-71 Kestrel in mid-2005.

The replacement cost of the fleet was estimated at $6.1 billion when the VH-71 contracts were signed in 2005. However, by March 2008 the cost of the new 28 helicopter fleet was projected to total US$11.2 billion, or roughly US$400 million per helicopter. Political controversy began in February 2009 amid calls for fiscal restraint, and, as a result, President Barack Obama announced that he had instructed Defense Secretary Robert Gates to review the helicopter situation and on 6 April 2009, Gates announced the ending of VH-71 funding, after nine aircraft had already been built at a cost of about US$600 million each.

In February 2010, the U.S. Navy issued a request for information (RFI) to the aviation industry. Responses would be used to restart the VXX contest. In April 2010, Sikorsky and Lockheed Martin announced they would team in offering the VH-92. In June, Boeing announced it was considering a licensed version of the AgustaWestland AW101, on which the VH-71 was based, to be built in the United States. Boeing was also considering the Bell-Boeing V-22 Osprey and Boeing CH-47 Chinook for the presidential VXX program. Whichever platform were picked would be expected to be delivered between 2017 and 2023.

On 23 November 2012, Naval Air Systems Command released a draft request for proposals for a new VXX program. The new requirements lowered the number of people the helicopter had to carry, shortened its range, and simplified its communications. By mid-2013, Boeing, Bell Helicopter and AgustaWestland declined to take part in the project. Only Sikorsky seemed likely to bid on the VXX contract.

On 7 May 2014, the Navy announced that the Sikorsky VH-92 had won the VXX competition, ahead of other potential competitors who decided not to submit a proposal. Subsequent to the VXX competition affairs, in November 2015, Lockheed Martin acquired Sikorsky Aircraft Corporation.

== See also ==
- Organization of the United States Marine Corps
