= Lockheed Martin VH-71 Kestrel =

Variant of the AgustaWestland AW101

VH-71 Kestrel
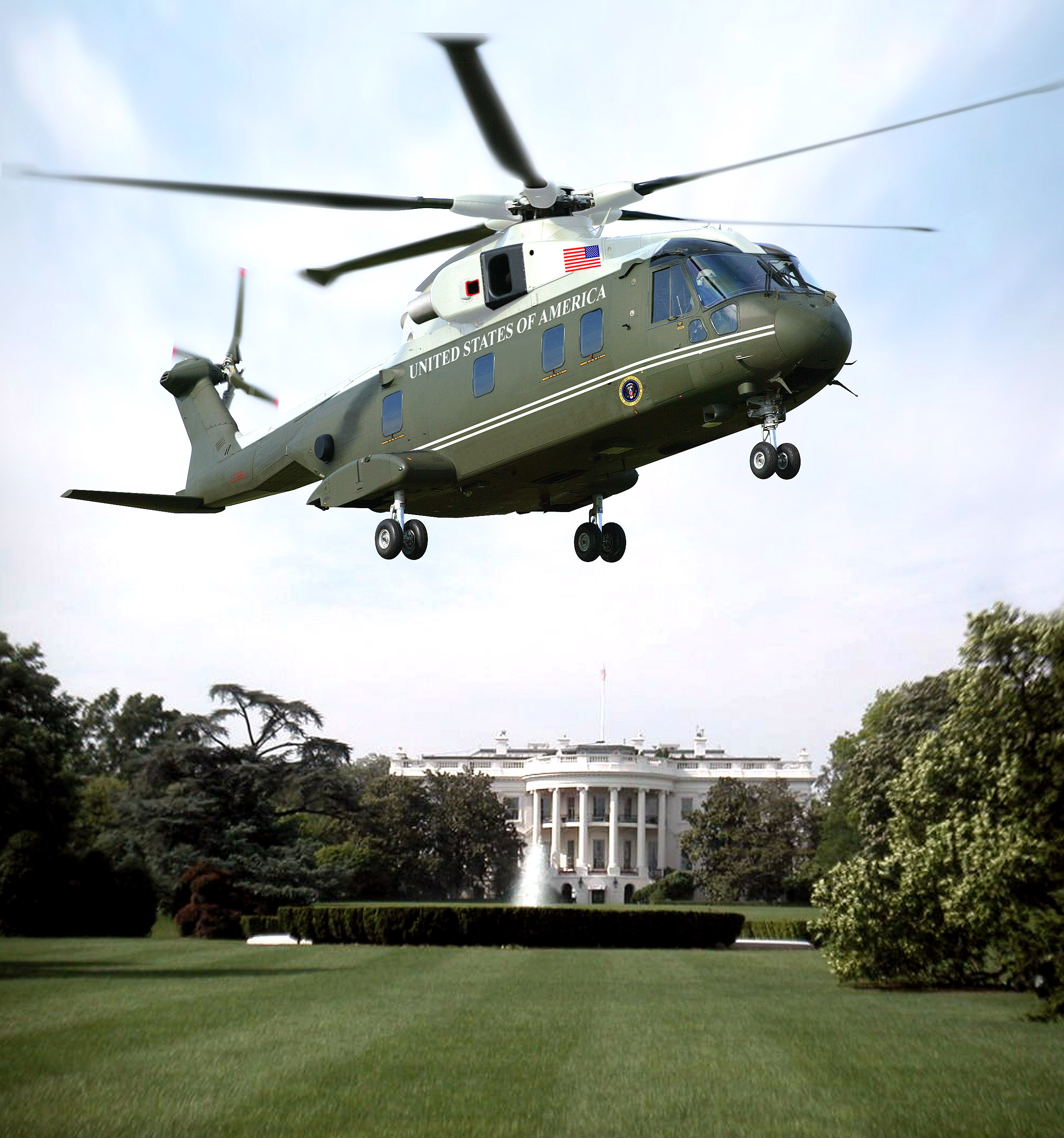
- VH-71 landing at the White House

General information
- Type: Executive transport helicopter
- Manufacturer: Lockheed Martin; AgustaWestland; Bell Helicopter (assembly)
- Status: Canceled
- Primary user: United States Marine Corps
- Number built: 9 (VH-71A)

History
- First flight: 3 July 2007
- Developed from: AgustaWestland AW101

The Lockheed Martin VH-71 Kestrel was a variant of the AgustaWestland AW101 helicopter that was being manufactured to replace the United States Marine Corps' Marine One U.S. presidential transport fleet. Originally marketed for various competitions as the US101, it was developed and manufactured in the US by a consortium headed by Lockheed Martin, consisting of Lockheed Martin Systems Integration – Owego (LMSI), AgustaWestland and Bell Helicopter.

In January 2005, the US101 was selected for the VXX Presidential Helicopter Replacement Program, and was promptly re-designated as the VH-71. However, development was subject to delays, cost overruns, and engineering issues; Lockheed attributed much of these issues to unanticipated and extensive modifications being demanded by the government that had been absent from the request for proposal (RFP) issued. A Government Accountability Office (GAO) report in 2011 also recognised that a lack of flexibility and compromise on the part of the government had negatively impacted the program. By late 2008, the cancellation of the VH-71 was looking increasingly likely.

In February 2009, President Barack Obama asked Secretary of Defense Robert Gates about placing the project on hold or canceling it because of its high cost: over $13 billion for the planned 28 helicopters. In June 2009, the U.S. Navy terminated the contract after spending about $4.4 billion and taking delivery of nine VH-71s. After the cancellation, the delivered helicopters were sold to Canada for $164 million, where they were used as source of spare parts for its fleet of AgustaWestland CH-149 Cormorant search-and-rescue helicopters.

== Development ==
=== US101 and VXX competition ===
The AgustaWestland AW101, initially designated as EH101, was originally developed and produced by EH Industries, which was a joint venture between the British Westland Helicopters and Italian Agusta companies; Westland merged with Agusta to form AgustaWestland in 2001. AgustaWestland held considerable interest in the export prospects of the AW101, including the prospects for an extensive overseas manufacturing consortium. On 23 July 2002, Lockheed Martin and AgustaWestland announced that they had signed a 10-year agreement to jointly market, manufacture and support a medium-lift helicopter, an AW101 derivative, in the United States. At that time, the team declared that the derivative, which was designated as the US101, would be "65% American". The companies envisaged the aircraft being adopted in three major roles; U.S. Air Force combat search and rescue, U.S. Coast Guard search and rescue, and U.S. Marine Corps executive transport.

In early 2002, the Lockheed-AgustaWestland partnership sought out other firms to participate in the proposed local manufacturing effort for the US101; in particular, the team pursued Bell Helicopters, which was at that time part of another EH101 consortium, offering the type in Canada. That same year, Rolls-Royce Holdings, who manufactured the EH101's RTM322, also sought out an American partner to locally produce the engine; Rolls-Royce also envisioned integrating US-specific technology into the engine and its potential use in powering the Sikorsky UH-60 Black Hawk helicopter. By August 2002, there were reports in the media, of various US aircraft manufacturers, including Bell, Boeing and Kaman Aerospace, that were holding discussions with the consortium and may potentially be selected as a subcontractor to perform the domestic assembly of the US101. Boeing showed persistent interest in joining the US101 consortium, as well as in alternate arrangements to produce the NHIndustries NH90 helicopter.

On 15 May 2003, AgustaWestland signed an agreement with Bell Helicopter to undertake final assembly of the US101 in the U.S. Under the pact, AgustaWestland would produce the main rotor blades and main fuselage sections at its headquarters in Yeovil, UK. The company would also manufacture other components, including the gearbox, at its facility in Cascina Costa, Italy; this represents a work share of 36 per cent. The remaining 64 per cent work share was split between Lockheed Martin (31 per cent) and Bell Helicopter (27 per cent) and other firms (6 per cent).

In February 2002, the US Marine Corps commenced a study to identify potential replacement rotorcraft for the aging Sikorsky VH-3D presidential transport helicopters. On 18 December 2003, the United States Department of Defense issued a Request for Proposals (RFP) for the supply of 23 helicopters to be used as a replacement for the 11 VH-3Ds and 8 VH-60Ns of the Marine Corps' HMX-1 squadron, which performs the role of Presidential helicopter transportation; this requirement was given the designation of VXX, or the Presidential Helicopter Replacement Program. Two companies, AgustaWestland and Sikorsky Aircraft responded to the VXX RFP; additionally, that had been interest in a potential Bell Boeing V-22 Osprey-based bid, however the rotorcraft was deemed to be non-transportable by military airlift and thus unsuitable to qualify.

Sikorsky had proposed the VH-92, a variant of the H-92 Superhawk, in partnership with FlightSafety International, L-3 Communications, Northrop Grumman, Rockwell Collins, Vought Aircraft Industries, and GE-Aviation. During the bidding process, Sikorsky attacked the US101 for its foreign origins; in December 2004, Sikorsky VXX programme manager Nick Lappos derided the bid as: ""What is a socialist country and a socialist company going to teach us about competition?". The selection was originally to occur in April 2004, however programme officials decided to postpone their decision for a further eight months to conduct more analysis on the bids.

On 28 January 2005, the Department of Defense announced that it had selected the US101 as the winner. It has been speculated that the US101's three engines had been a decisive factor over the rivaling twin-engined VH-92. John Young, the USN's assistant secretary for acquisition technology and logistics, stated of the selection: "The Lockheed team probably started with a helicopter that needed less. They more closely met the requirements we had laid out, and that allowed them to table less work that had to be completed to get to the finish line and deliver a product". The US101 team was awarded a US$1.7 billion contract for the System Development and Demonstration phase. In July 2005, the US101 received the military designation VH-71 Kestrel.

=== Program problems and delays ===
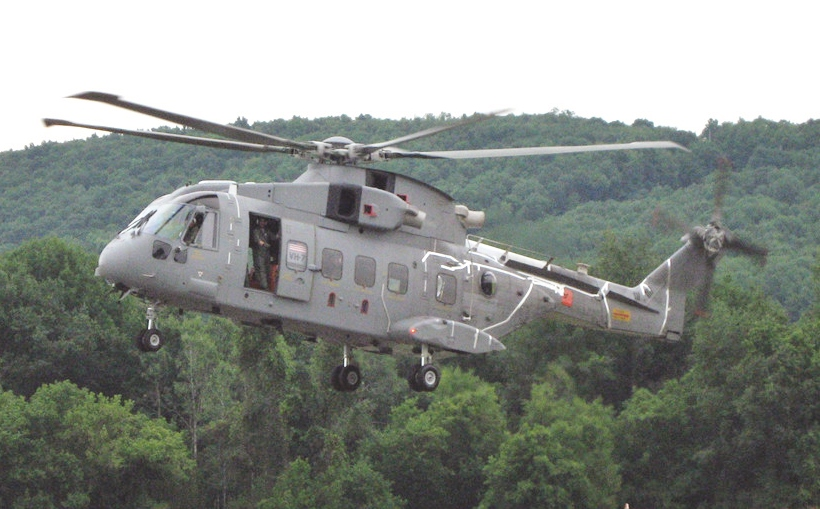
An AW101 undergoing VH-71 testing near the Lockheed facility in Owego, New York

Delays and engineering issues plagued the VH-71's development. By 2007, the estimated cost of developing and modifying the aircraft had risen by 40% to $2.4 billion and had passed the $4.2 billion expected for the production of the fleet. In March 2008, the program cost had risen and was projected to cost a total $11.2 billion,<ref"Capitol Hill expected to weigh in on embattled VH-71". Aviation Week. Aerospace Daily and Defense Report. 17 March 2008. Archived from the original on 15 January 2016.</ref> or about $400 million per helicopter.

During dialogue over the CSAR-X (in which the EH101 was LMSI's offering), the Air Force Source Selection Authority (SSA) stated the program's performance had been "unsatisfactory". In March 2007, a Government Accountability Office (GAO) report, upholding Sikorsky and Lockheed's protests against Boeing's HH-47, mentioned "LMSI had received a little confidence rating for past performance due to unsatisfactory performance under its current contract for the VH-71 Presidential helicopter, which was evaluated as the most highly relevant to this procurement." The SSA stated that LMSI had "show[n] that it could not reliably meet important schedule requirements and had difficulty in systems engineering flow-downs to their subcontractors." Lockheed responded that government insistence on extensive modifications, unanticipated in the RFP, as the source of cost overruns. A GAO report in 2011 concluded that the VH-71's development was not allowed flexibility or trade-offs considered by the customer.

In December 2007, DoD officials met with the White House Military Office to discuss the program's future; the Pentagon had apparently wanted to terminate the VH-71 due to setbacks, budget issues, and design problems. The White House overruled a decision to cancel; the program was effectively placed on hold while options were considered. In July 2008, the VH-71A (also called Increment 1) was to reach operating capability in 2010. The second phase of the development, VH-71B (Increment 2) was expected to start entering service in 2017.

In October 2008, while commenting on defense programs likely to be cut following the change in government, John Young, the Undersecretary of Defense for Acquisition, Technology and Logistics, stated that the VH-71 "is very high on that list". The rising cost of VH-71 program contrasted poorly with President Barack Obama's stance on curbing government spending; during a White House gathering in February 2009 President Obama commented that the procurement process had "gone amok and we are going to have to fix it." He additionally stated that "The helicopter I have now seems perfectly adequate to me." In March 2009 the projected total cost for the planned 28 VH-71s was over $13 billion. On 6 April 2009 the proposed Defense budget announced by Defense Secretary Robert Gates had not included funding for the VH-71. On 1 June 2009, the U.S. Navy announced that the contract was officially canceled, and that remaining funds were to be reinvested in upgrades to the existing fleet of VH-3D and VH-60N helicopters. Nine VH-71s had been completed at time of the cancellation.

The aircraft's cancellation provoked commentators to speak out about its impact on future acquisition contracts with European businesses. The failure by the U.S. Department of Defense acquisition process as demonstrated by the VH-71 may scare away potential partners. Around March 2009, a coalition of lawmakers encouraged the Administration to continue a variation of the VH-71 program. A letter issued by several members of Congress urged the President to support a VH-71 program. On 22 July 2009, the House Appropriations Committee approved $485 million to make five VH-71As operational.. An additional nine airframes were sold to the Royal Canadian Air Force in 2012, to be used as spare parts for the CH-149 Cormorant, and to aid in their midlife service upgrade.

=== Options and restructuring ===
The Congressional Research Service (CRS) estimated that shutting down VH-71 production, upgrading the existing fleet, and later implementing a successor program would cost $14–$21 billion. It was reported not only that a new fleet would not be available until 2024 (at which point the existing helicopters would have remained in service while being over 50 years old), but that terminating the existing program would waste more than $3 billion in sunk VH-71 costs. Following the President's decision to terminate the program a variety of lawmakers, think tanks and media outlets publicly concluded it would be more cost-effective and less time-consuming to continue with a variation of the existing VH-71 program.

In 2009, the CRS proposed four options: Option 1 was to continue the VH-71 program with Increment I and II versions; the additional cost was estimated at $10 billion and the entry into service date was 2019. Option 2 was to restructure the program to provide 23 Increment I aircraft; at an additional cost of $6.4 billion and would be operational by 2012. Option 3 was a restructure to provide 19 Increment I aircraft to replace the current fleet; the additional cost for this option was estimated at $5.6 billion and the entry into service by 2012. The last option was to upgrade and extend life of current fleet at a cost of $1.4 billion; however this would not meet the standards required for future presidential helicopters, and would require replacement sooner.

In addition to the cost of a new procurement program, industry officials stated that to merely extend the operating life of the current fleet is a risky choice because it is both less secure and costly to maintain. Lawmakers from both sides of the aisle, including Senator Chuck Schumer (D-NY) and Representative Roscoe Bartlett (R-MD) have been outspoken critics of the Pentagon in the matter—Bartlett recently claiming that "they had this conversation outside the partnership and we regret that." Loren Thompson, an analyst for the Lexington Institute, stated "I do not believe that the story of VH-71 is over... Secretary Gates has not made a convincing case for terminating the program, and there is no alternative helicopter that can satisfy range and payload requirements while still landing on the White House lawn."

On 19 December 2009, President Obama signed a joint House and Senate Defense Appropriation Bill for FY 2010, which includes $130 million funding for the Marine One program: $100 million to recoup technologies developed under the VH-71 Kestrel program, and $30 million for the Navy's initial studies on a new VH-XX program. In February 2010, the Navy issued a request for information to the aviation industry. In April 2010, Lockheed Martin announced they would team with Sikorsky in offering the Sikorsky S-92 instead of the VH-71. In June 2010, Boeing announced it was considering a U.S.-built licensed version of the AgustaWestland AW101 for the renewed VXX program as well as the Bell-Boeing V-22 Osprey and Boeing CH-47 Chinook.

In June 2011, the nine VH-71s were purchased for $164 million by Canada for use as spare parts for its fleet of AgustaWestland CH-149 Cormorant search and rescue helicopter, which is also based upon the AW101. The transferred VH-71s were stripped of sensitive parts, and seven remained in an airworthy condition. In 2013, media reports stated Canada was studying whether up to four of the VH-71s can be certified for operational use; manufacturer AgustaWestland has openly stated their support for the regeneration initiative. On 8 August 2018, it was reported that Leonardo S.p.A. was converting the seven airworthy helicopters into mission-ready CH-149s.

=== Testing ===
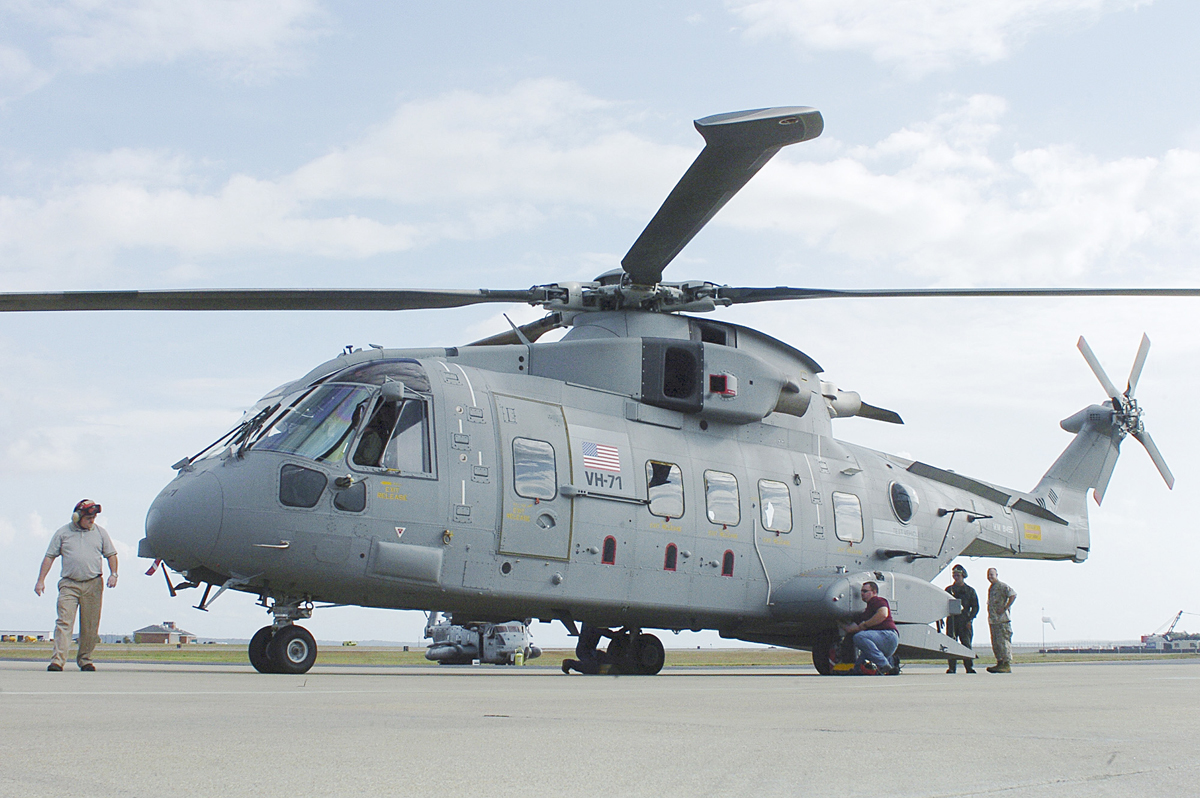
A VH-71 test aircraft at Marine Corps Air Facility Quantico, October 2005

The first test VH-71A, Test Vehicle #2 (TV-2), made its initial flight on 3 July 2007 at AgustaWestland's facility in Yeovil in the UK. Lockheed Martin also used an EH101, designated TV-1, for initial testing in the United States; these tests included landing on the lawn of the White House.

The first production VH-71A, Pilot Production #1 (PP-1), made its maiden flight on 22 September 2008 from Yeovil. The US Air Force transported the helicopter in a C-17 Globemaster III to Naval Air Station Patuxent River, Maryland, for further testing. The first production VH-71 joined the test program at NAS Patuxent River, beginning ground testing in early December 2008.

== Variants ==
VH-71A
The initial production VH-71 aircraft or Increment one of the presidential helicopter replacement program, designed to meet an urgent need for new helicopters.

VH-71B
Increment two was to provide 23 operational helicopters with increased range, and upgraded navigation and communications systems that fulfill White House requirements to maintain continuity of government and allow the president to carry out the duties of the office.

=== Other competitions ===
The US101 also competed for two further USAF contracts, the 141-aircraft Combat Search and Rescue Replacement (CSAR-X) project (originally won by the Boeing HH-47 on 10 November 2006, but now subject to a second procurement competition), and the 70-aircraft Common Vertical Lift Support Program (CVLSP).

== Operators ==
United States of America

- United States Marine Corps (proposed)
  - HMX-1's Marine One fleet

== Specifications (VH-71) ==
Specifications with an asterisk (*) next to them are specifically for the VH-71. All others are for AW101.

Data from Jane's All The World's Aircraft 2003–2004, others

General characteristics

- Crew: 4
- Capacity: 14 seated troops*
- Length: 64 ft 1 in (19.53 m)
- Rotor diameter: 61 ft (18.59 m)
- Height: 21 ft 8¾ in (6.62 m)
- Disc area: 2,992.5 ft^{2} (271.51 m^{2})
- Empty weight: 23,149 lb (10,500 kg)
- Max takeoff weight: 34,392 lb (15,600 kg)
- Powerplant: 3× General Electric CT7-8E turboshafts, 2,520 shp (1,879 kW) (take-off power) each

Performance

- Never exceed speed: 167 knots (192 mph, 309 km/h)
- Cruise speed: 150 knots (167 mph, 278 km/h)
- Range: 863 mi (1,389 km)
- Service ceiling: 15,010 ft (4,575 m)
- Rate of climb: 2,010 ft/min (10.2 m/s)
- Disc loading: 11.0 lb/ft^{2} (53.8 kg/m^{2})
- Power/mass: 0.174 shp/lb (0.2849 kW/kg)

== See also ==
- Military transport aircraft

Related development

- AgustaWestland AW101
- AgustaWestland CH-149 Cormorant

Aircraft of comparable role, configuration, and era

- NHIndustries NH90
- Sikorsky VH-92

Related lists

- List of rotorcraft
