= HH-47 CSAR-X prototype =

2000s proposed American military helicopter

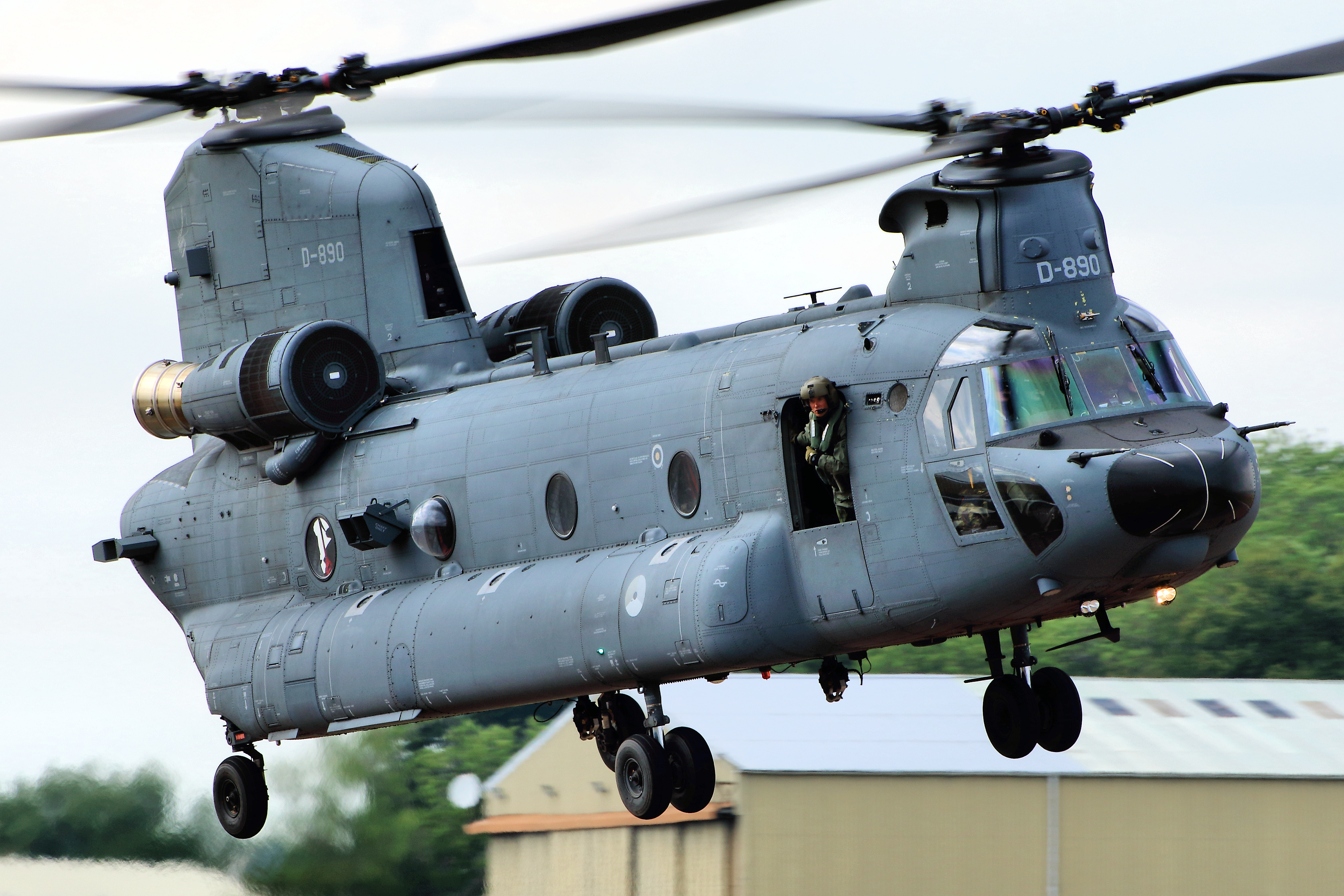
A CH-47F, similar to the prototype designed by the Boeing team

The HH-47 CSAR-X was a proposed helicopter by Boeing as a medium/heavy lift alternative to the HH-60 Pave Hawk. After several tests, Boeing was pronounced the winner and the HH-47 was selected for use. However, Lockheed Martin protested the decision and requested a Government Accountability Office review in 2007. Four development HH-47s were to be built, with the first of 141 production aircraft planned to enter service in 2012. In February 2010, the USAF announced plans to replace aging HH-60G helicopters, and deferred secondary combat search and rescue requirements calling for a larger helicopter. After a long process, the Air Force did not choose the larger HH-47, and the HH-60W entered service in 2020 to replace the older helicopters.

== Background ==
The ideal CSAR-X was a medium-lift helicopter that would replace the Air Force's fleet of HH-60G Pave Hawk helicopters, which were quickly approaching their useful service life limit. The CSAR-X's main objective was to recover shot down airmen and rescue soldiers stranded in harsh environments, unreachable by any other means. The proposal guidelines stated that the helicopter must be able to fly out to 316 miles and loiter for five minutes during an extraction, and return to base. This was a much larger range compared to the HH-60 Pave Hawk, which could only reach out 213 miles under the same rescue scenario.

== Design and development ==
The HH-47 was equipped with forward-looking infrared pods, terrain avoidance radar, a rescue hoist and was capable of in-flight refueling. The aircraft used a special anti-corrosion layer and heavier armor for its fuselage. The HH-47 CSAR-X model featured an environmentally controlled patient treatment area, de-icing/cold weather improvements, and wire strike protection, such as cutters below and above the cockpit.

The environmentally controlled treatment area contained four litters and several life support systems. On top of internal redesign, the engines and avionics were upgraded, leading to the implementation of DAFCS (digital automatic flight control system) and more powerful engines. This area was capable of basic triage while returning to base (TACEVAC).

Block 10 upgrades included NBC (nuclear/biological/chemical) protection, swept tip rotor blades, head-mounted displays (HMDs), and a new radio suite are the main focuses of the upgrade. Radios such as JTRS and FAB-T satellite communications would've been critical for staying on the cutting edge of the Air Force's technological use. An improved wireless intercom was also a primary target for Boeing.

This meant that the HH-47 was uniquely suited to long range combat search and rescue (CSAR) operations, a capability that was lacking in the Air Force's opinion. After the initial approval, four prototypes were to be designed, with 141 to be built over the next five years, ending in 2012. A short Boeing ad was produced showcasing its capability and capacity in combat rescue operations.

== Cancellation ==
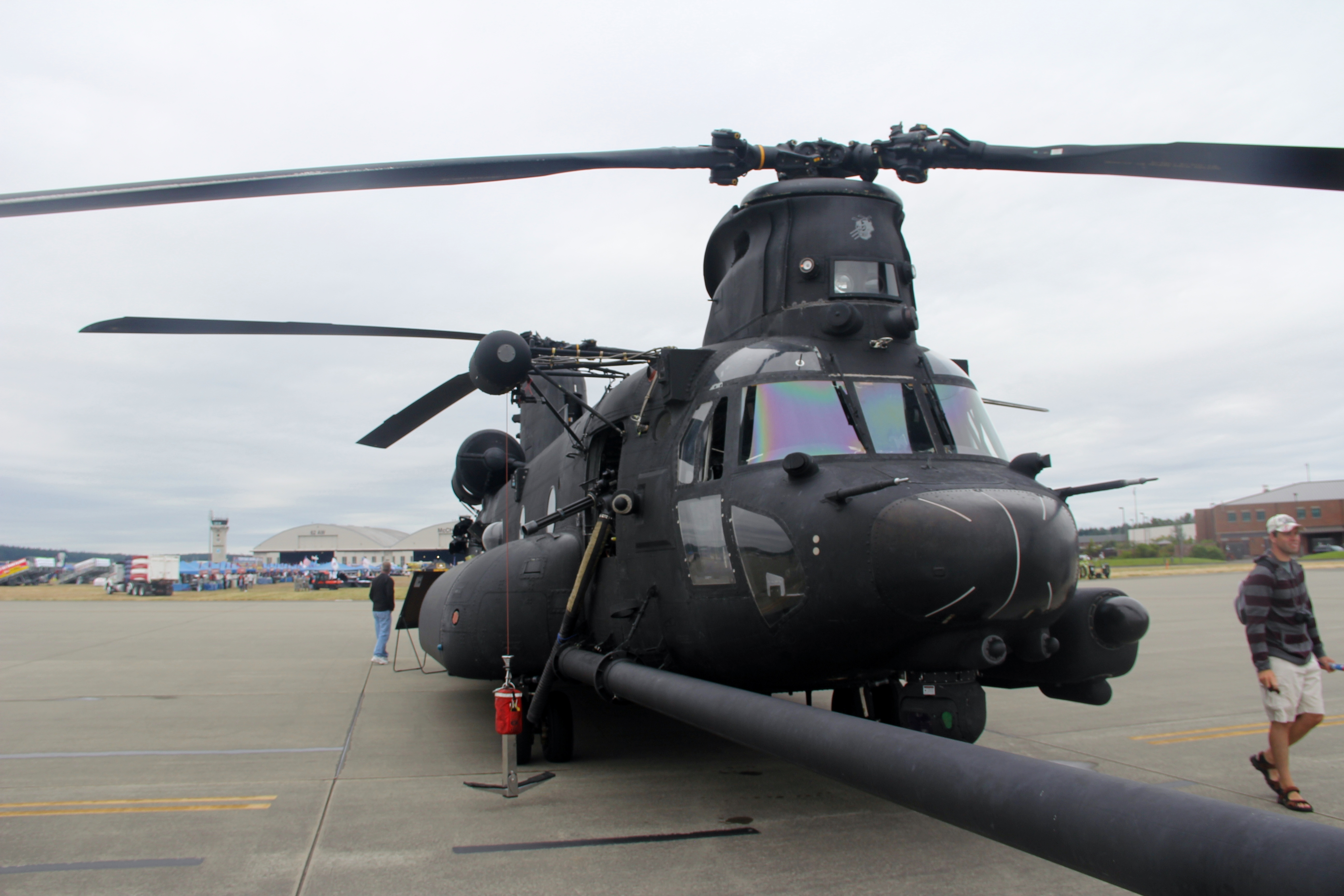
An MH-47G, displayed at an airshow. This helicopter is a vastly upgraded CH-47, designed for special operations.

However, Lockheed Martin and Sikorsky filed a protest days after the grant. The GAO found that the Air Force's method of evaluating most probable life cycle cost (MPLCC) was inconsistent and that US101's life cycle was $3 billion less than the other design options. However, the Air Force has previously stated that cost was not a factor in their choice.

Additionally, Sue C. Payton, the Air Force’s acquisition executive, said that the HH-47 represented the best overall value and met the criteria of “better than any other proposal." The HH-47 had the longest range, best mission capability, and top past performance, considering the U.S. military's usage of the Chinook series for over 60 years. In addition, the similarity to the MH-47G, another derivative of the CH-47, allowed parts to be easily transferred among aircraft.

== See also ==
- Lockheed Martin VH-71 Kestrel (US101)
