= White House helipad =

Helipad at the White House

Coordinates: 38°53′50″N 77°02′12″W

Sikorsky VH-92 Patriot initial takeoff from White House Helipad on September 21, 2026

The White House helipad is located on the South Lawn of the White House, with a paved pathway to the White House driveway. It was constructed in 2026 to accommodate the Sikorsky VH-92 Patriot's use as the new Marine One presidential helicopter. Previously, less powerful Marine One helicopters landed on temporary metal disks placed on the lawn. The helipad contains a gabbro depiction of the presidential seal.

== Background ==
The presidential helicopter Marine One traditionally landed on manually-placed temporary metal disks on the South Lawn which served as a landing zone since 1957. To replace the Sikorsky VH-3D, in service for four decades, the Sikorsky VH-92 Patriot was tested in 2018 and discovered to scorch and uproot the lawn creating hazardous debris due to its powerful rotor wash and engine exhaust. To accommodate the VH-92 for White House flights, President Donald Trump suggested a permanent granite helipad.

== History ==
Construction began in June 2026 shortly after and in the area of the UFC Freedom 250 event, while the Ellipse was designated a temporary landing area.

The project cost an estimated $5–$6 million and was financed entirely by the manufacturer Sikorsky Aircraft. Two months into construction, President Trump requested a rebuild because the foundation followed the natural slope of the South Lawn instead of being more level to also host patio events yet still provide proper drainage.

Construction continued throughout all hours of the day in order to finish in time for the September 23 state visit of Chinese leader Xi Jinping. The helipad was completed ahead of schedule in early September and the ribbon cutting ceremony occurred on September 21, when Trump flew to Joint Base Andrews to board Air Force One for a trip to New York to address the United Nations General Assembly.

On September 24, Trump gave Xi Jinping a tour of the renovated White House grounds including the new Marine One and granite helipad that also was the stage for a Silent Military Drill performance.

== Design ==
The roughly 100-foot (30 m) diameter helipad is a depiction of the presidential seal carved out of 4-inch thick (102 mm) black granite with Californian white granite inlays. A granite path connects the helipad to the driveway, which leads to the restored ground floor entrance into the Diplomatic Reception Room. Another visible change is that the entrance section of the White House's driveway, formerly asphalt, was replaced with white granite.

== Gallery ==
Helipad construction in July 2026 when concrete is poured.

The helipad with South Lawn turf being laid in September 2026.

President Trump and Secretary of Education Linda McMahon host a back to school event on the incomplete helipad

Donald and Melania Trump participate in a Silent Drill Platoon review with Xi Jinping and Peng Liyuan

Trump gives Xi Jinping a tour of Marine One and the Helipad
