= Marine Corps Air Facility Quantico =

US Marine Corps base near Quantico, Virginia, United States

- Turner Field
- Part of Marine Corps Base Quantico
- Triangle, Virginia in the United States
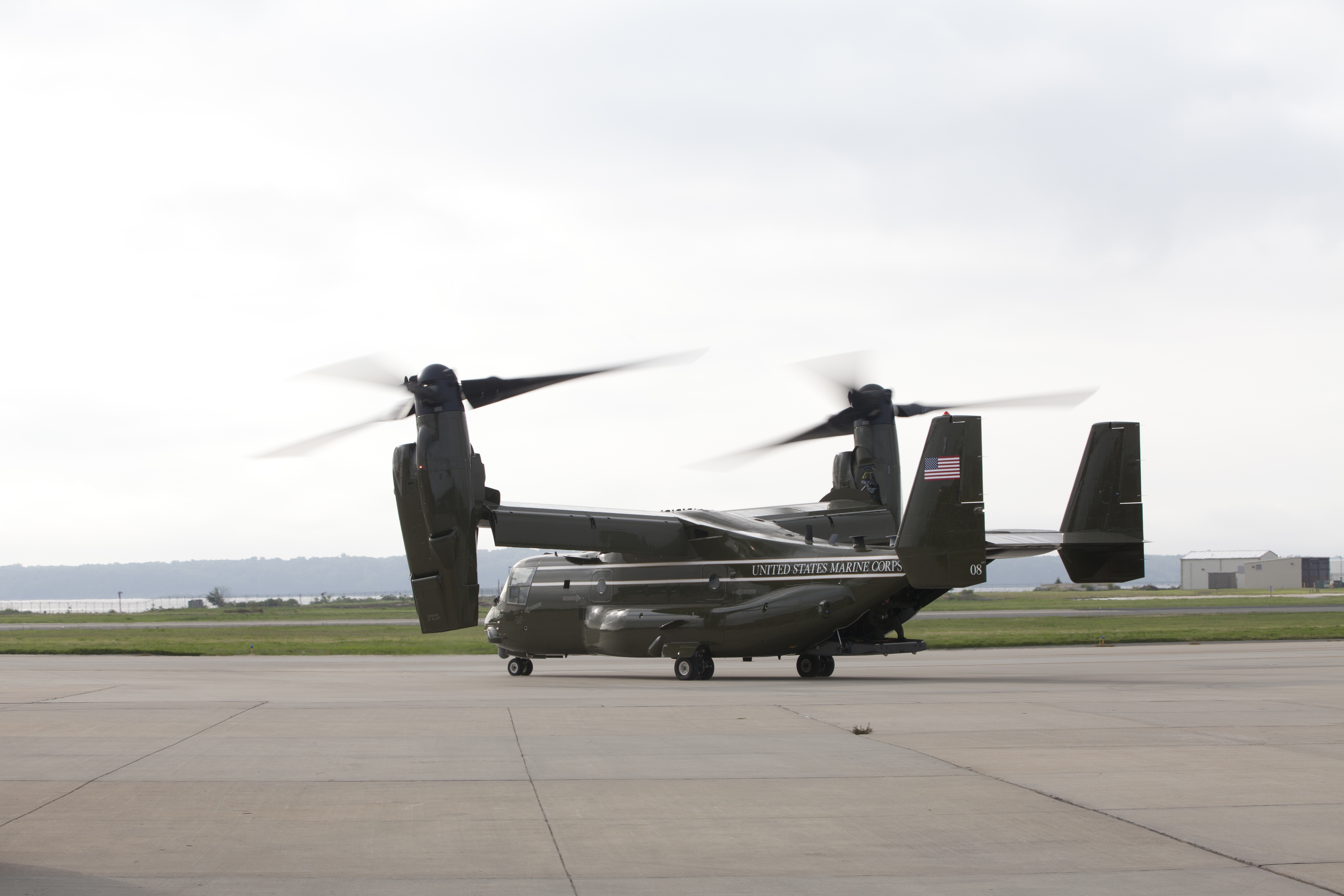
- A US Marine Corps MV-22 Osprey sits on the flight line at MCAF Quantico in 2014.

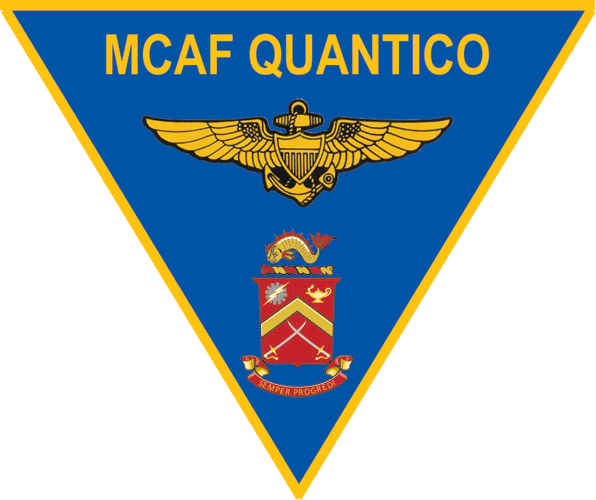

Site information
- Type: Marine Corps Air Facility
- Owner: Department of Defense
- Operator: US Marine Corps
- Controlled by: Marine Corps Installations National Capital Region
- Condition: Operational
- Website: www.quantico.marines.mil/mcaf/UnitHome.aspx

Location
- Location in the United States
- Coordinates: 38°30′13″N 077°18′18″W

Site history
- Built: 1931
- In use: 1931 – present

Garrison information
- Current commander: Lieutenant Colonel Robert S. Vuolo
- Garrison: Marine Helicopter Squadron One (HMX-1)

Airfield information
- Identifiers: IATA: NYG, ICAO: KNYG, FAA LID: NYG, WMO: 724035
- Elevation: 3.3 metres (11 ft) AMSL
Runways
Direction	Length and surface
02/20	1,295.4 metres (4,250 ft) Asphalt

Marine Corps Air Facility Quantico (MCAF Quantico) (IATA: NYG, ICAO: KNYG, FAA LID: NYG) is a United States Marine Corps airfield located within Marine Corps Base Quantico, Virginia. It was commissioned in 1919 and is currently home to HMX-1, the squadron that flies the President of the United States. The airfield is also known as Turner Field, after Colonel Thomas C. Turner, a veteran Marine aviator and the second director of Marine Corps Aviation, who lost his life in Haiti in 1931.

On 12 August 2010, a new Quantico air facility to accommodate maintenance and storage of HMX-1 helicopters was dedicated in honor of Marine One founding commander Col. Virgil D. Olson (1919–2012).

== History ==
Aviation first arrived at Quantico on 6 May 1896 when Dr. Samuel Pierpont Langley (1834–1906), Astronomer and third Secretary of the Smithsonian Institution, launched his successful Aerodrome #5, a steam engine powered, unpiloted aircraft from a houseboat in the shadow of Chopawamsic Island adjacent to the present-day approach end of Runway 20 at Quantico Marine Corps Air Facility. The #5 Aerodrome made two successful flights that afternoon, one of 1005 m/3300 ft and a second of 700 m/2300 ft (these are horizontal distances measured along a curving flight path) at a speed of approximately 25 mph.

To this success was added the flight on 28 November 1896 of the Langley Aerodrome #6 (which was a re-engineered version of Langley Aerodrome #4) in a similar location alongside Chopawamsic Island. Aerodrome #6 was also launched from a houseboat unpiloted and steam powered and flew 1460 m/4,790 ft. Both Aerodromes #5 and #6 used gasoline as heat fuel to vaporize water to power the steam engines.

These successes were encouraging, and design and construction began on a Great Aerodrome, or Aerodrome A, which was intended to be large enough to carry a pilot. An unpiloted scale model of this design was built, named the Quarter-Scale Aerodrome, was powered by a gasoline engine and flew twice on 18 June 1901. Another flight of the Quarter-Scale was made with an improved engine on 8 August 1903.

The first attempted test flight of Aerodrome A, a large man-carrying Aerodrome with a sophisticated gasoline-powered rotary engine, was on 7 October 1903 from a larger houseboat moored near Widewater, Virginia, in the Potomac River a few miles south of present-day MCAF Quantico and the earlier successful Aerodrome #5 and #6 flights. This first attempt with Aerodrome A ended in failure, and the experiment was tried again after repairs were made on 8 December 1903 (nine days before the Wright Brothers and their Flyer took to the air at Kitty Hawk, North Carolina). This second attempt at launching Aerodrome A also ended in failure. The pilot (Langley's assistant, Charles M. Manly) was not seriously injured.

In July 1918, two kite balloons were flown to spot artillery fire. These forerunners of today's spotter aircraft were soon augmented with the assignment of four seaplanes, which operated from the muddy junction of Chopawamsic Creek and the Potomac River.

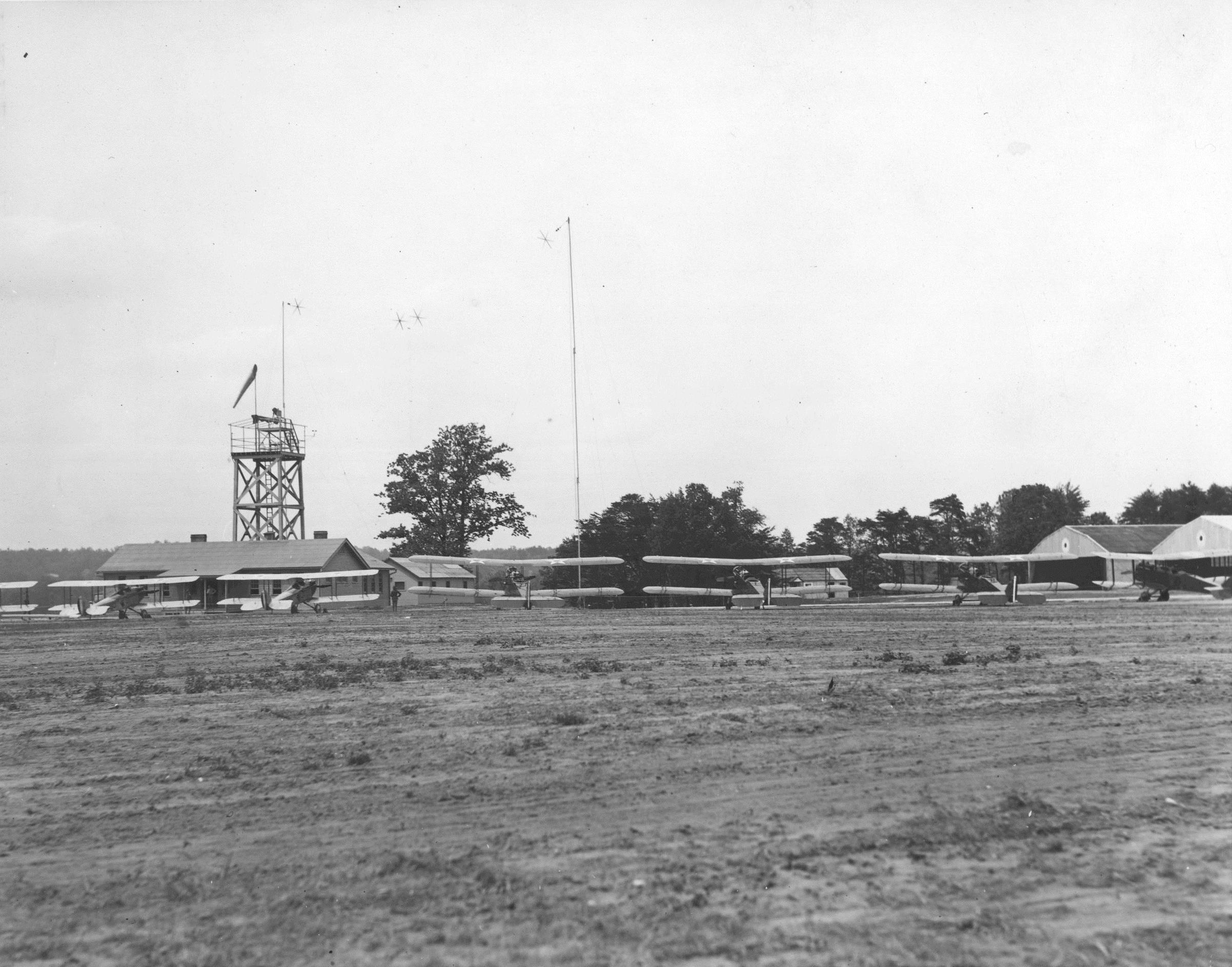
Brown Field, Quantico, Virginia, circa 1922

In 1919, a flying field was laid out and the land leased to accommodate a squadron returning from World War I combat in Europe. The facility was later named Brown Field, in memory of 2ndLt Walter Vernon Brown, who lost his life nearby in an aviation accident on 9 June 1921. The present site was selected in 1931, when larger and faster planes brought recognition of the limitations and hazards of Brown Field—its single, crosswind runway, bound by trees, hills, swamp, a high tension line and a railroad.

A new airfield was constructed by changing the course and flow of Chopawamsic Creek and reclamation of the marshland from that area. The new facility was named Turner Field.

By 1939, four squadrons—68 bombers, scout bombers, fighters, transports, utility and observation planes—were based at the airfield. On 1 December 1941, the field was named Marine Corps Air Station Quantico, and placed under operational control of the Commanding General, Marine Barracks.

In 1947, Marine Helicopter Squadron One was established at Quantico to pioneer an entirely new concept in air operation; to evaluate and test, in coordination with the Landing Force development Center, the theory of carrying troops to the battle zone by helicopter.

By the close of the Korean War, helicopters had gained permanent acceptance by the military for tactical and logistical support operations. Effective 15 November 1976, MCAS Quantico was re-designated as Marine Corps Air Facility (MCAF), Quantico, Virginia. MCAF Quantico is currently the home of Marine Helicopter Squadron One (HMX-1)].

HMX-1, in addition to its tactical development mission, flies the President of the United States and provides helicopter support for the Marine Corps Combat Development Command.

On 1 October 2015, MCAF Quantico was reorganized under the Commander, Marine Corps Installations National Capital Region (MCINCR), headquartered at Marine Corps Base Quantico, Virginia.

== Based units ==
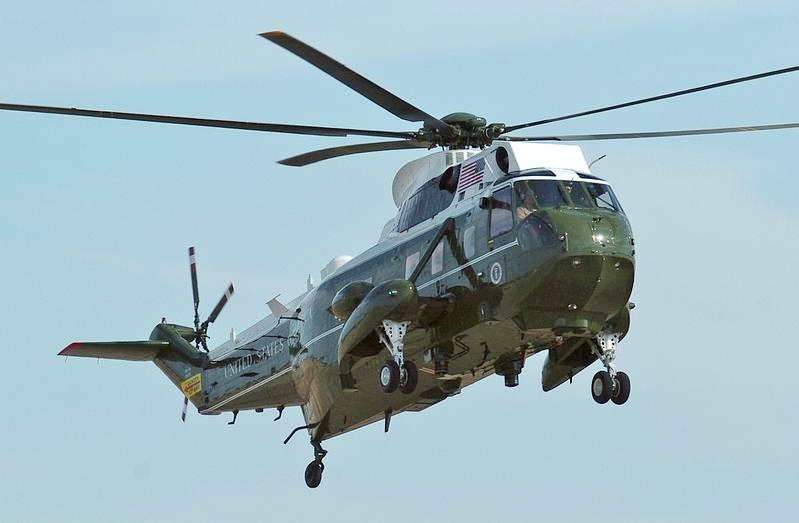
A VH-3D Sea King of HMX1.

Units based at MCAF Quantico.

=== United States Marine Corps ===
Deputy Commandant for Aviation

- Marine Helicopter Squadron 1 (HMX-1) – UH-3D Sea King, VH-3D Sea King, UH-60N Black Hawk, VH-60N White Hawk and MV-22B Osprey

== See also ==
- List of United States Marine Corps installations
- List of airports in Virginia
