= Sikorsky VH-92 Patriot =

American presidential transport helicopter

VH-92 Patriot
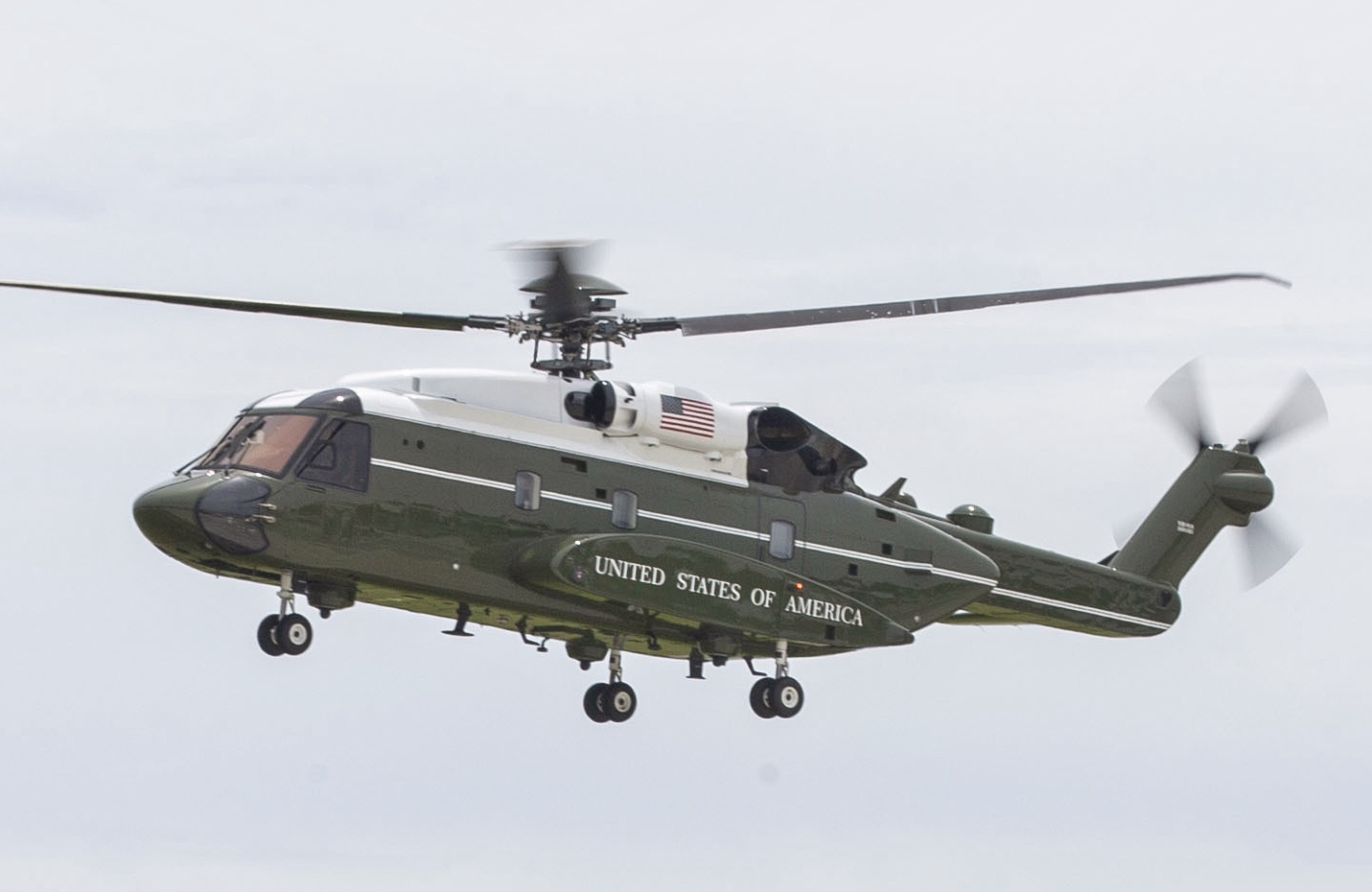
- U.S. Marine Corps VH-92A flying during HMX-1's 75th Anniversary Reunion at Marine Corps Base Quantico, Virginia in June 2022.

General information
- Type: Medium-lift transport/utility helicopter
- National origin: United States
- Manufacturer: Sikorsky Aircraft / Lockheed Martin
- Status: Operational
- Primary user: United States Marine Corps
- Number built: 23

History
- First flight: 28 July 2017
- Developed from: Sikorsky S-92

The Sikorsky/Lockheed Martin VH-92 Patriot is an American helicopter operated in the United States Marine Corps' Marine One U.S. presidential transport fleet. It is a militarized variant of the Sikorsky S-92.

== Design and development ==
Sikorsky entered the VH-92 variant of the S-92 into the VXX competition in the early 2000s for the U.S. presidential helicopter Marine One, replacing the Sikorsky VH-3D Sea King and VH-60N White Hawk, but lost to the Lockheed Martin VH-71 Kestrel. However, the competition was restarted in 2010 due to ballooning VH-71 development costs, allowing Sikorsky to resubmit the VH-92 in April 2010. By mid-2013, all other aircraft manufacturers had dropped out of the contest, leaving only Sikorsky.

On 7 May 2014, it was announced that the VH-92 had won the restarted VXX competition. In May 2014, Sikorsky was awarded a US$1.24 billion contract to produce the VH-92, which is outfitted with an executive interior and military mission support systems, including triple electrical power and redundant flight controls. Six of the variant, designated VH-92A, were ordered by the U.S. Navy for delivery in 2017.

Sikorsky expected the USN to eventually order 17 production aircraft, with the first of three orders for those aircraft coming by early 2019. The total FY2015 program cost is $4.718 billion for 23 helicopters, at an average cost of $205M per aircraft. In July 2016, the design passed its Critical Design Review, clearing it for production.

== Operational history ==
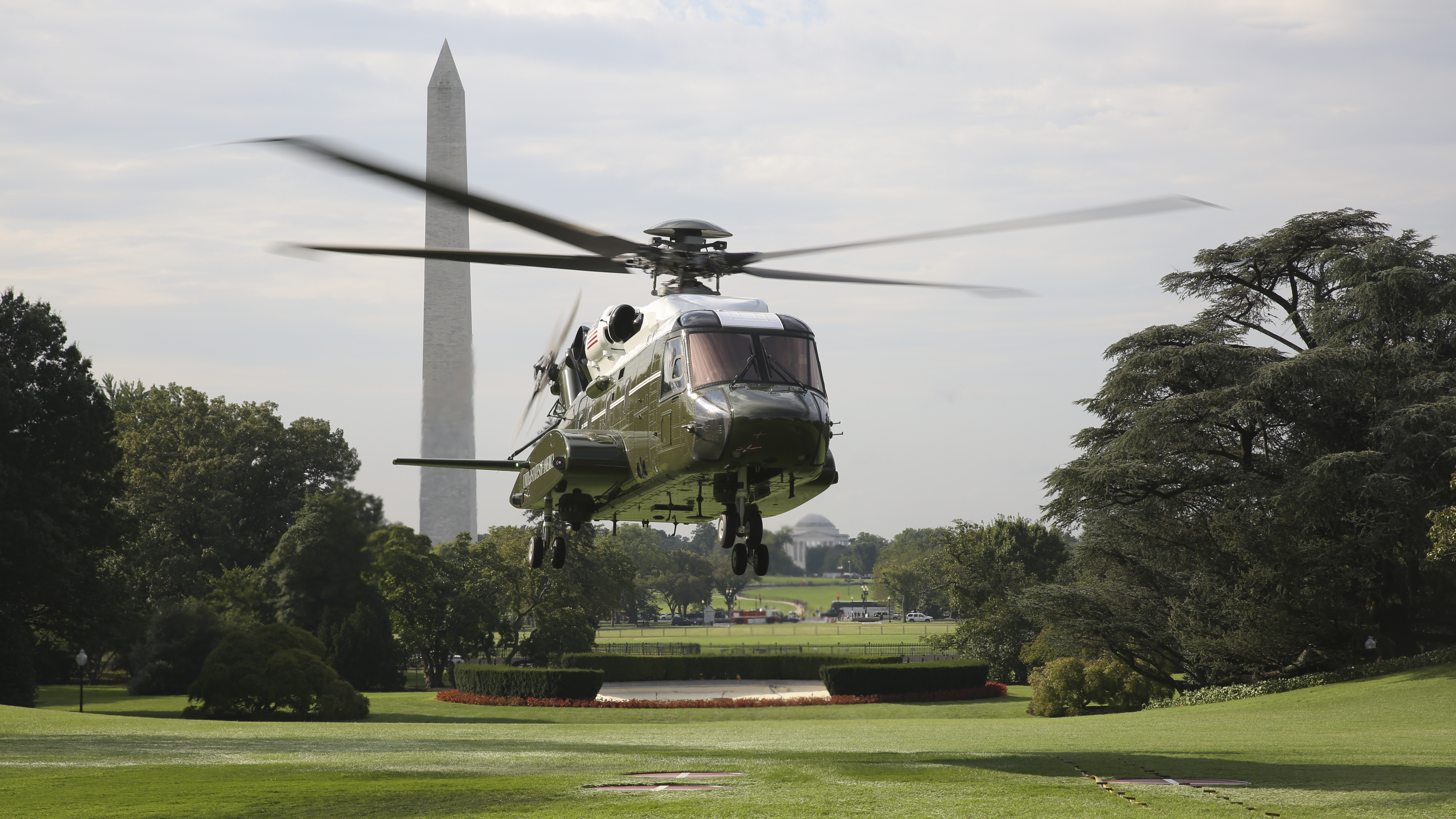
A developmental VH-92A helicopter conducts landing and take-off testing on White House South Lawn with Washington Monument background in September 2018

On 28 July 2017, the first VH-92A performed its maiden flight at Sikorsky's Stratford, Connecticut, facility. On 22 September 2018, a VH-92 was flown to the White House for take-off and landing tests on the traditional South Lawn areas used for Marine One.

In late November 2021, Pentagon officials noted the aircraft was "failing to meet the reliability, availability or maintainability threshold requirements" and had damaged the landing zones with its powerful rotor wash and fuel leaks during test flights. The VH-92 had not yet entered service carrying VIPs.

On 28 December 2021, the VH-92 achieved its Initial Operational Capability (IOC) milestone. However, the aircraft, named "Patriot" in 2022, was still unable to transport the president or vice president due to issues with its encrypted communications systems and the powerful rotor wash uprooting the South Lawn of the White House creating safety hazards with flying debris. The decision was made to maintain service of the older VH-3D for White House flights avoiding the hazards and damage, until 2026, when President Trump made the decision to construct a permanent South Lawn helipad entirely financed by Sikorsky.

Following the resolution of early integration and encrypted communications challenges, the Pentagon's Director of Operational Test and Evaluation assessed the aircraft as operationally effective. On 14 August 2024, Sikorsky formally completed delivery of the final batch of the 23 contracted VH-92A aircraft—comprising 21 operational models and two test aircraft—to Marine Helicopter Squadron One (HMX-1).

A VH-92 made its inaugural flight as Marine One on 19 August 2024 carrying President Joe Biden from Chicago's O'Hare International Airport to Soldier Field en route to the 2024 Democratic National Convention.

To ensure long-term sustainability, the U.S. Navy awarded Sikorsky an approximately $107.3 million performance contract in August 2026 to design, integrate, and test upgraded "Power Margin Increment Two" main rotor blades, with development slated to continue through March 2031.

== Variants ==
- VH-92A Patriot: 23 (21 operational, 2 test/training)

== Operators ==
United States

- United States Marine Corps (23)

== Specifications (S-92) ==
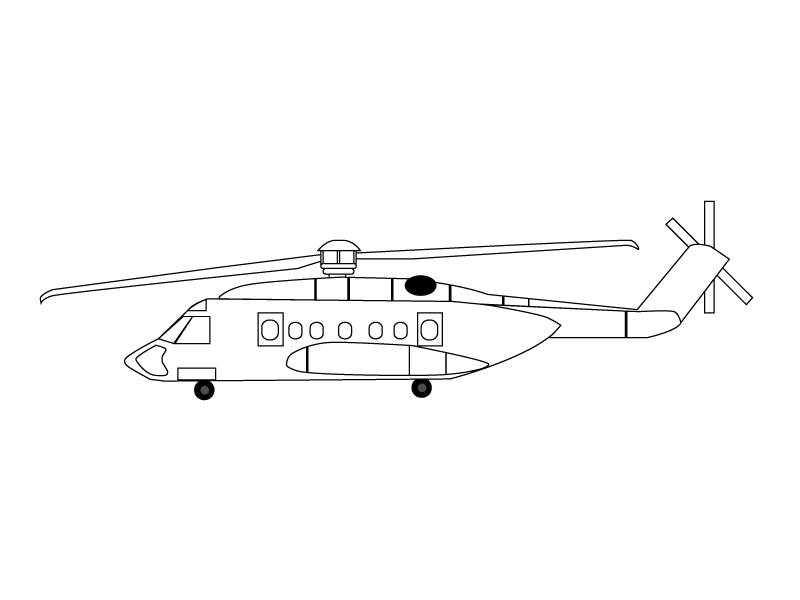

Data from Sikorsky S-92 specifications, International Directory of Civil Aircraft and the U.S. Navy.

General characteristics

- Crew: 4 (pilot, co-pilot, communication systems operator, crew chief)
- Capacity: 14 passengers
- Length: 56 ft 2 in (17.12 m)
- Width: 17 ft 2 in (5.23 m)
- Height: 15 ft 5 in (4.70 m)
- Cabin dimensions: 20 ft (6 m) long by 6 ft 8 in (2 m) tall
- Empty weight: 15,500 lb (7,031 kg)
- Gross weight: 26,500 lb (12,020 kg)
- Max takeoff weight: 27,700 lb (12,565 kg)
- Powerplant: 2 × General Electric CT7-8A turboshaft engine, 2,520 shp (1,880 kW) each equivalent
- Main rotor diameter: 56 ft 4 in (17.17 m)
- Main rotor area: 2,492.3 sq ft (231.54 m^{2})
- Blade section: - root: Sikorsky SC2110; tip: Sikorsky SSC-A09

Performance

- Maximum speed: 165 kn (190 mph, 306 km/h)
- Cruise speed: 151 kn (174 mph, 280 km/h)
- Range: 539 nmi (620 mi, 998 km)
- Service ceiling: 14,000 ft (4,300 m)
- Disk loading: 9.8 lb/sq ft (48 kg/m^{2})
- Power/mass: 0.23 shp/lb (0.38 kW/kg)

== See also ==
Related development

- Sikorsky S-92
- Sikorsky CH-148 Cyclone

Aircraft of comparable role, configuration, and era

- AgustaWestland AW101
- Eurocopter EC725
- Lockheed Martin VH-71 Kestrel
- Mil Mi-38
- NHIndustries NH90

Related lists

- List of rotorcraft
