= AgustaWestland AW101 =

Multi-role helicopter family by AgustaWestland

AW101
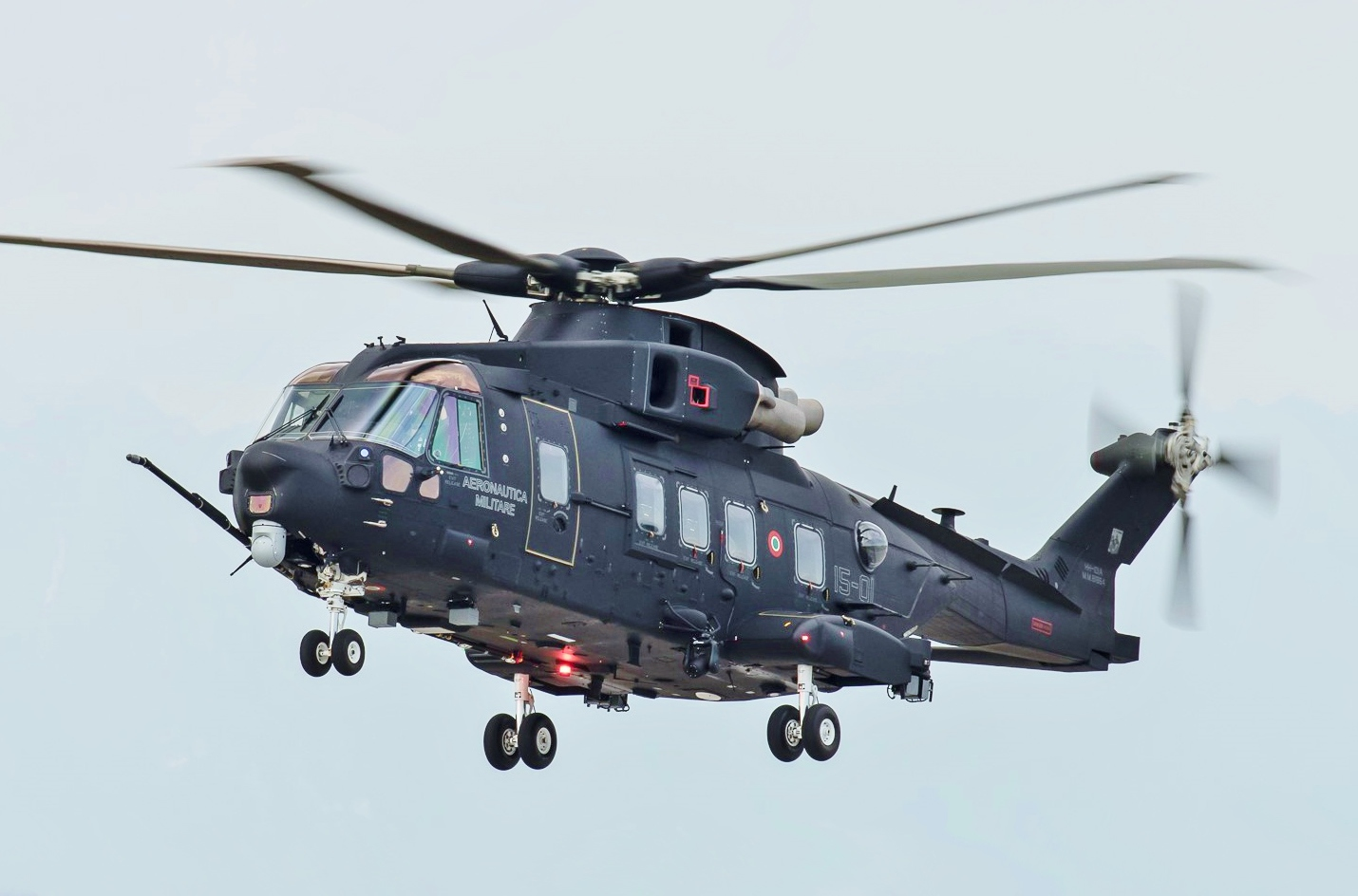
- An Italian Air Force AW101

General information
- Type: Anti-submarine warfare, medium-lift transport, search and rescue and utility helicopter
- National origin: Italy; United Kingdom
- Manufacturer: Agusta; Westland Helicopters; AgustaWestland; Finmeccanica; Leonardo S.p.A.
- Status: In service
- Primary users: Royal Navy: Royal Air Force (historical); Polish Navy; Royal Norwegian Air Force; Italian Navy

History
- Manufactured: 1990s–present
- Introduction date: 1999
- First flight: 9 October 1987
- Variants: AgustaWestland CH-149 Cormorant; Lockheed Martin VH-71 Kestrel

The AgustaWestland AW101 is a medium-lift helicopter in military and civil use. First flown in 1987, it was developed by a joint venture between Westland Helicopters in the United Kingdom and Agusta in Italy in response to national requirements for a modern naval utility helicopter. Several operators, including the armed forces of Britain, Denmark, and Portugal, use the name Merlin for their AW101 aircraft. It is manufactured at factories in Yeovil, England, and Vergiate, Italy. Licensed assembly work has also taken place in Japan and the United States.

Prior to 2007, the aircraft had been marketed under the designation EH101. The original designation was EHI 01, from the name given to the Anglo-Italian joint venture—European Helicopter Industries—but a transcription error changed this to EH101. In 2000, Westland Helicopters and Agusta merged to form AgustaWestland, leading to the type's current designation.

The AW101 entered into service in 1999 and has since replaced several older helicopter types, such as the Sikorsky SH-3 Sea King, performing roles such as medium-sized transport, anti-submarine warfare, search and rescue, and ship-based utility operations. The Royal Canadian Air Force (RCAF) operates the CH-149 Cormorant variant for air-sea rescue. Another variant, the Lockheed Martin VH-71 Kestrel, was produced to serve in the United States presidential transport fleet before the program was cancelled and the aircraft sold off to Canada for parts. Civil operators use the AW101 for passenger and VIP transportation. The type has been deployed to active combat theatres, such as in support of coalition forces during the Iraq War and the war in Afghanistan.

== Development ==
=== Origins ===
In 1977, the UK Ministry of Defence issued a requirement for an anti-submarine warfare (ASW) helicopter to replace the Royal Navy's Westland Sea Kings, which were becoming inadequate in the face of advances in Soviet submarine technology. Westland Helicopters put together a proposal, designated WG.34, for a three-engined helicopter of similar dimensions to the Sea King; the WG.34 was to feature more autonomy and a greater range than its predecessor. At the same time, the Italian Navy (Marina Militare) was also considering the replacement of its fleet of Sea Kings, which had been built by the Italian company Agusta; Westland and Agusta soon began talks regarding the joint development of a successor helicopter.

Agusta and Westland finalised an agreement to work on the project together, and formed a jointly owned new company, EH Industries Limited (EHI), to pursue the development and marketing of the new helicopter to potential operators. On 12 June 1981, the UK government confirmed its participation in the project, allocated an initial budget of £20 million to develop nine pre-series examples. A major agreement, which secured funding for the majority of the EH101's development program, was signed by both the British and Italian governments in 1984. At the 1985 Paris Air Show, Agusta showed a mock-up of a utility version of the new helicopter, leading to a more generalised design that could be customised to meet the needs of various civilian or military customers. The first prototype flew on 9 October 1987.

In 1987, Canada selected the EH101 to replace its Sea Kings in the anti-submarine warfare and search and rescue roles. The EH101's third engine and increased range compared favourably with rival aircraft, such as the Sikorsky Seahawk. The range and de-icing capability were also seen as vital for North Atlantic operations. The fledgling EH101, of which up to 50 were on order to replace the Canadian Armed Forces's (CAF) Sea Kings, found itself subject to a wider political battle between the country's Conservative and Liberal parties, the latter viewing the aircraft as too costly. Critics attacked the EH101 purchase as excessive and unnecessary after the Cold War's end in the early 1990s. Wide-ranging cost estimates were presented by both proponents and opponents of the EH101 procurement, with opponents backing life extensions of Sikorsky CH-124 Sea King and Boeing Vertol CH-113 Labrador helicopter fleets. The EH101 controversy was seen as a factor in the 1993 Canadian federal election. The order was cancelled by the new Liberal government in 1993 resulting in a $470 million cancellation fee.

=== Into production ===
Several pre-production aircraft were assembled during the late 1980s and early 1990s. The first pre-production aircraft had its first flight powered by General Electric CT7-2A engines on 9 October 1987. Flight tests were suspended for six months following the crash of the second pre-production aircraft on 21 January 1993. On 6 June 1993, the first EH101 took its maiden flight with the Rolls-Royce Turbomeca RTM322 turboshaft engine. Nine prototypes were built to explore military and civil applications, including a "heliliner" configuration. In February 1995, Britain formally placed its first order for a total of 22 EH101s; this was quickly followed by Italy's order for 16 EH101s in October 1995. The EH101 order was not without controversy, the RAF had declared its preference for an all-Chinook fleet; also, Boeing allegedly offered cheaper terms for the Chinook. RAF deliveries began in 1997; RN deliveries started the following year.

Following the merger of Westland and Agusta to form AgustaWestland in 2000, there was no need for the separate EHI entity; the EH101 was formally re-branded as the AW101 in 2007. By April 2009, more than 180 AW101s had been sold worldwide; the combined operational fleet had also accumulated a total of 170,000 flying hours.

=== Further developments ===
In November 2007, Algeria signed a contract for six AW101 helicopters. In August 2012, it was reported that Algeria had signed an agreement with AgustaWestland for the provision of up to 80 helicopters, 42 of which were to be AW101s. Under the terms of this arrangement, early aircraft were to be manufactured by AgustaWestland, while Algeria was to commence the assembly of some AW101s later on.

By September 2013 AgustaWestland was in the process of acquiring civil certification for the AW101; prospective customers include offshore oil platform operators and VIP clients. As of February 2014, AgustaWestland was considering adapting the AW101 as a heavyweight unmanned aerial vehicle, it is proposed that in this configuration an AW101 could be optionally crewed.

On 7 June 2010, it was announced that Boeing had acquired a manufacturing licence and the rights from AgustaWestland for US production of a localised AW101 variant, designated as the Boeing 101. In October 2012, the aircraft was submitted in a US Air Force competition to replace the HH-60 Pave Hawk; however, the bid was dropped three months later.

== Design ==
=== Overview ===
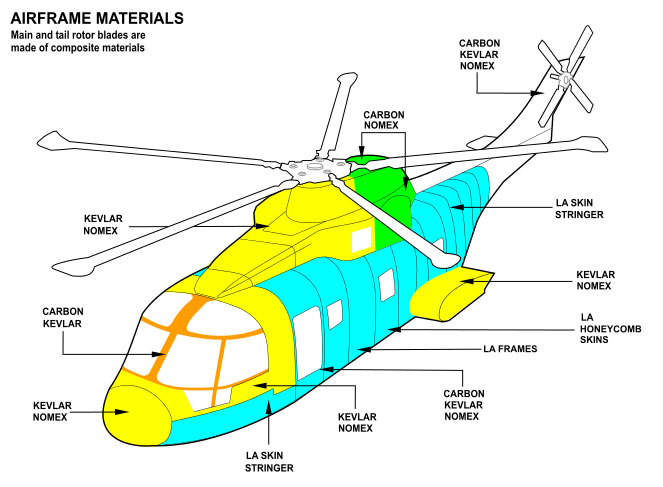
AW101 airframe diagram

The AW101 follows a conventional design layout, but makes use of advanced technologies, such as the design of the rotor blades, avionics systems, and extensive use of composite materials. The fuselage structure is modular and comprises an aluminium–lithium alloy, designed to be both light and damage-resistant. The AW101 is designed for operating in extreme weather conditions; it is fitted with a de-icing system and rated to operate in temperatures ranging between −45 and +50 °C. The aircraft's control systems allow the AW101 to maintain a stable hover in 74 km/h (40 kn) crosswinds.

An active vibration control system, known as the active control of structural response system, reduces airframe vibration by up to 80%, increasing crew comfort and minimising buildup of stress on the airframe. The cockpit is fitted with armoured seats for the crew, and can withstand an impact velocity of over 10 m/s. Dual flight controls are provided, though the AW101 can be flown by a single person. The pilots' instrument displays include six full-colour high-definition screens and an optional mission display; a digital map or forward looking infrared (FLIR) display can also be installed.

=== Powerplant ===
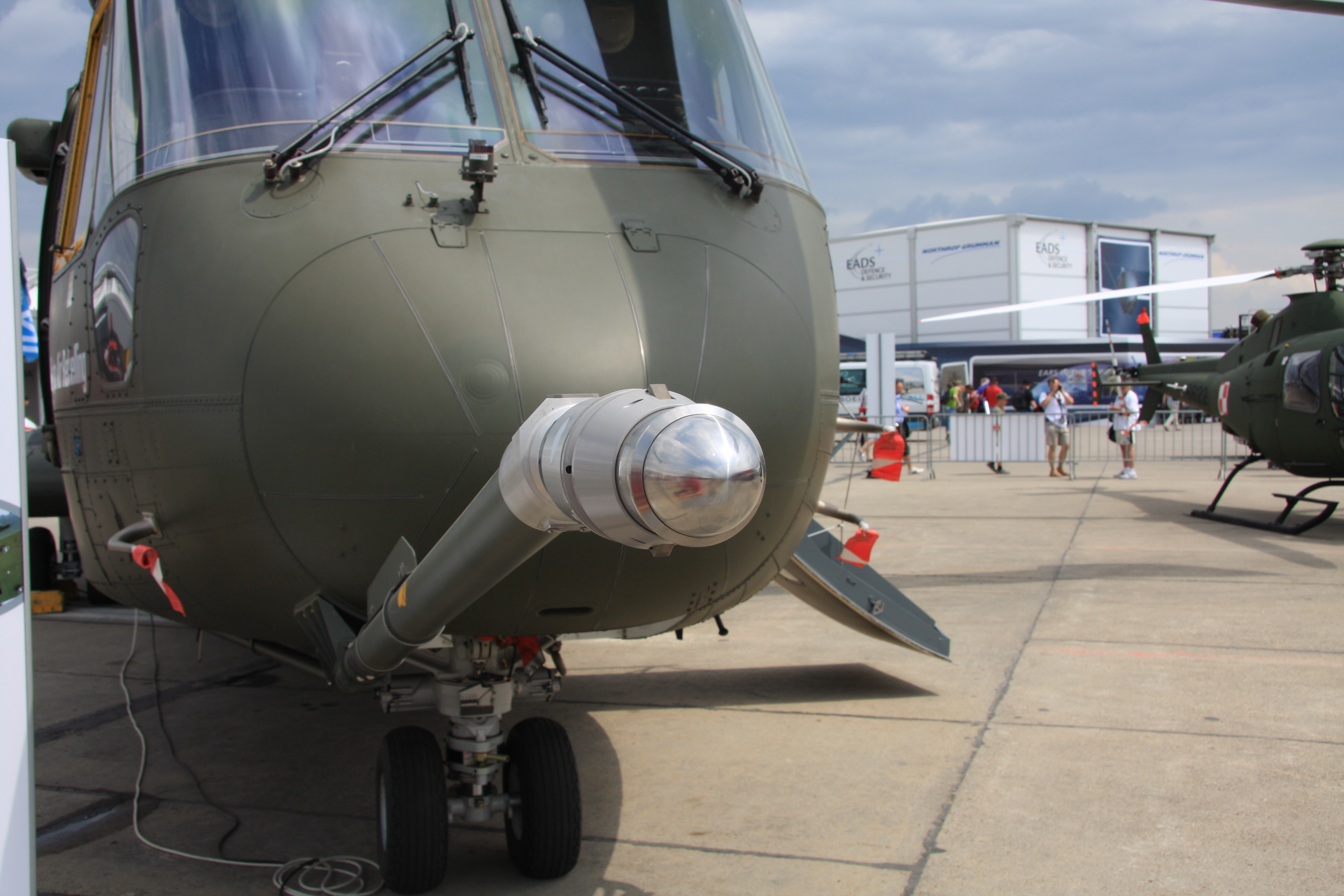
Probe for aerial refuelling

The AW101 is powered by three turboshaft engines. Initially the Rolls-Royce Turbomeca RTM322 producing 2,035 to 2,160 shp (1,517 to 1,611 kW) and the General Electric CT7 producing 1,960 to 2,329 shp (1,462 to 1,737 kW) were the two available engine types, but by 2020 new aircraft were only being sold with the CT7-8E. The RTM322 powerplant was specifically developed for the AW101; it was subsequently adopted on the AgustaWestland WAH-64 Apache and the NHIndustries NH90 helicopters. According to Rolls-Royce, about 80% of AW101s use the RTM322

The engines power an 18.59 m (61 ft 0 in) diameter five-bladed main rotor. The rotor blades are constructed from carbon/glass with nomex honeycomb and rohacell foam, edged with titanium alloy in a sandwich construction. The shaping of the main rotor blades is derived from the BERP rotor blades first used on the Westland Lynx. This blade design improves aerodynamic efficiency at the blade tip and reduces the acoustic signature. Improved BERP IV rotors have since been developed; when installed this increases the AW101's maximum take-off weight.

Each engine is supplied by a separate 1,074 L (284 US gal; 236 imp gal) fuel tank using dual booster pumps. Optional fourth and fifth tanks can be added to act as a reservoir supply, topping up the main tanks during flight, increasing range or endurance. The AW101 can also be fitted with a probe for aerial refuelling. Self-sealing fuel tanks are an optional item to be selected by the customer. An inlet particle separator system can be installed, protecting the engine when operating in sandy environments.

=== Armament and defensive systems ===
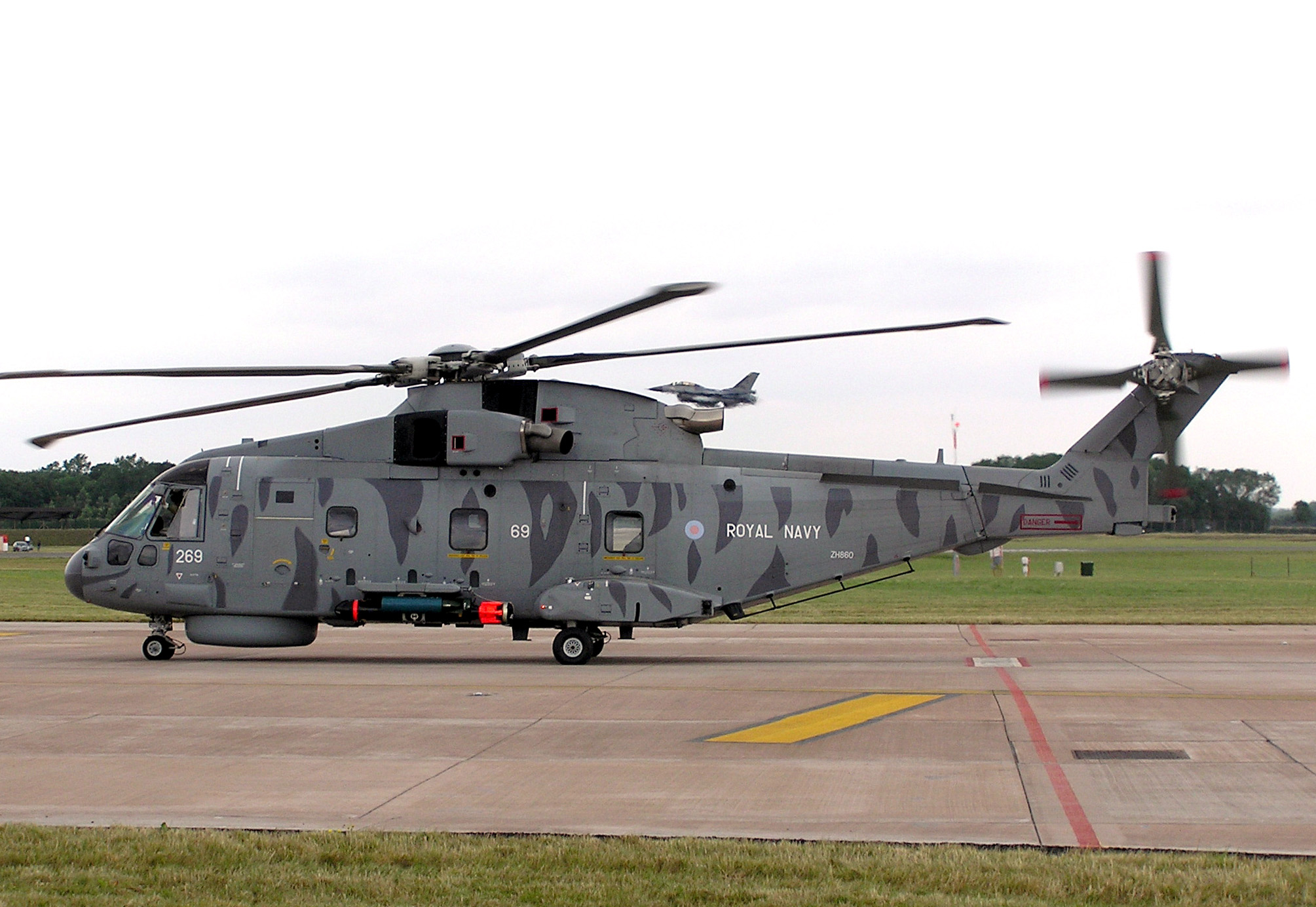
A Merlin HM1 loaded with a Sting Ray torpedo

Most variants of the AW101 are equipped with self-defence systems, such as chaff and flare dispensers, directed infrared countermeasures (infrared jammers), ESM (electronic support measures in the form of RF heads), and a laser detection and warning system. British Merlins have been outfitted with protective armour against small-arms fire. A side-mounted forward looking infrared (FLIR) imaging sensor has been fitted to some variants.

Two hardpoints are present in the underside of the airframe on which the HM1 model can carry four Sting Ray torpedoes or Mk 11 Mod 3 depth charges. Some customers have chosen to deploy the Marte anti-ship missile on the AW101; as of 2011, the Royal Navy is considering equipping their Merlin fleet with an anti-surface missile. The Mk1, Mk3 and Mk3A variants can mount general purpose machine guns in up to five locations in the main cabin, aimed out of both door and window apertures. AgustaWestland has examined the integration of rockets and additional ground-attack weapons.

=== Avionics ===
Westland and IBM formed a consortium in 1991 to perform the helicopter's complex systems integration. The AW101 features a network of helicopter management and mission systems designed to reduce pilot workload and enable the helicopter to undertake a wide variety of missions. A digital automatic flight control system (AFCS) is employed by the AW101. The AFCS allows the operation of a four-axis (pitch, roll, yaw and collective) autopilot and the automatic stabilisation system, and is linked in with the aircraft's flight management systems. The AFCS, manufactured by Smiths Aerospace, is a dual-duplex system using two flight computers to provide redundancy and fault-tolerance.

The AW101's navigation system includes a GPS receiver and inertial navigation system, VHF omnidirectional radio range (VOR), instrument landing system (ILS), TACAN, and automatic direction finding. The Mk1 and Mk3 are equipped with a Doppler velocity system (DVS) which provides relative ground velocities; the DVS is also linked into the AFCS as part of the autostabilisation system. For safety, the aircraft is equipped with obstacle and terrain avoidance warning systems, traffic collision avoidance system (TCAS), and both voice and flight data recorders.

The AW101 was initially equipped with the Ferranti Blue Kestrel search and detection radar which is capable of 360 degree scanning and can detect small targets as far as 25 nautical miles away. As part of the Royal Navy's Merlin HM2 upgrade program, Lockheed Martin implemented a series of improvements to the radar, notably allowing it to track 40 times the number of targets previously capable. Danish EH101s are fitted with the RDR-1600 search and weather radar. Mk 2 Royal Navy Merlins are equipped with the AQS903 anti-submarine system for processing sonographic data from sonobuoys to detect and target submerged submarines. The AQS903 was derived from the AQS901 system on the earlier Hawker Siddeley Nimrod maritime patrol aircraft.

=== Crew and cargo ===
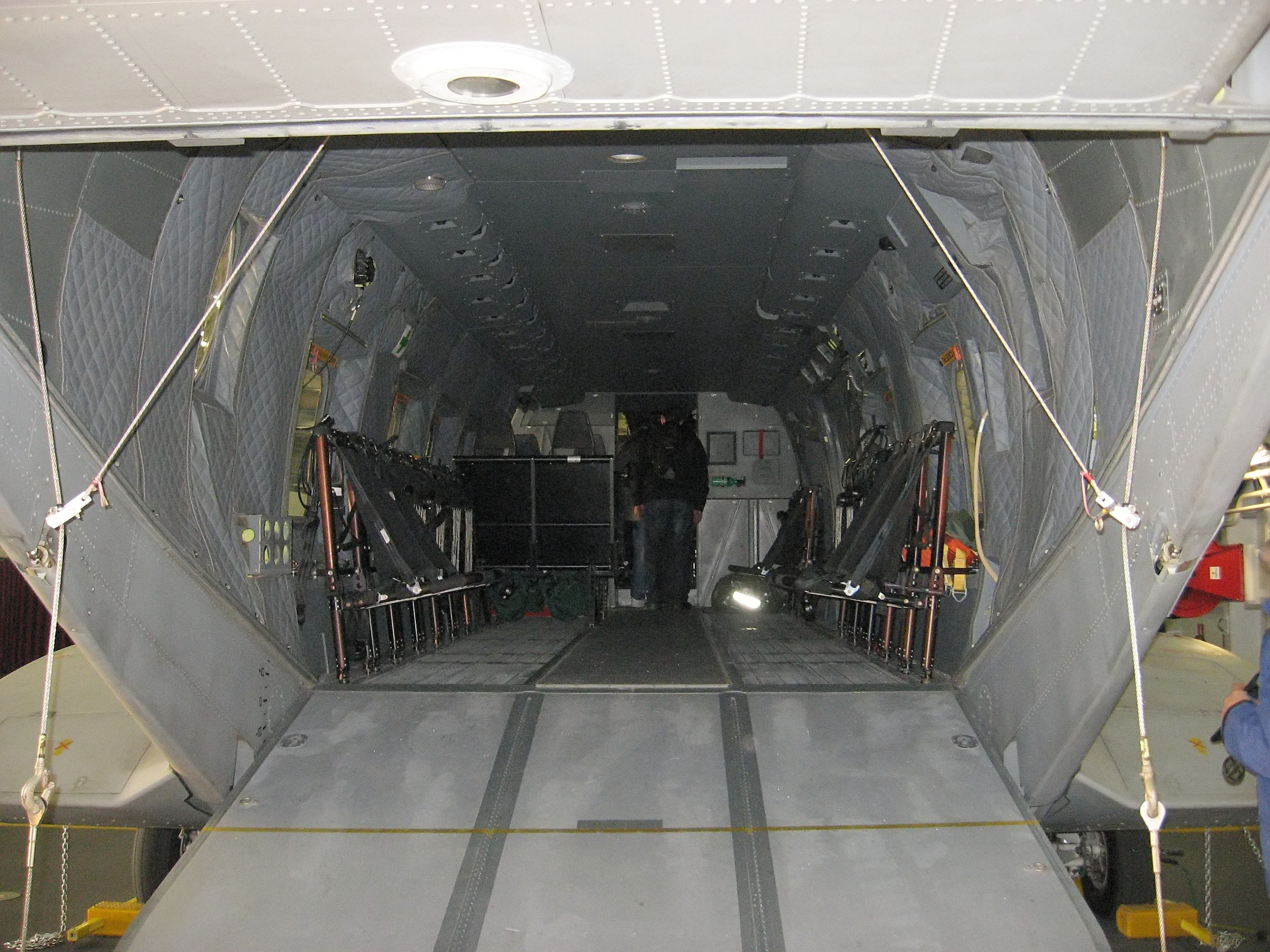
The ramp and interior of an AW101

The AW101 is typically operated by a crew of three: a pilot, an observer, and a crewman/operator. The pilot is able to fly for the majority of a mission in a hands-off mode, enabled by the sophisticated autopilot. All crew members have individual access to management computers and tactical information.

The fuselage has a volume of 31.91 cubic metres (1,127 cu ft) and the cargo compartment is 6.5 metres (21 ft) in length, 2.3 metres (7 ft 7 in) wide and 1.91 metres (6 ft 3 in) high. The military version of the AW101 can accommodate up to 24 seated or 45 standing combat troops and their equipment. Alternative loads include a medical team and 16 stretchers, and cargo pallets.

The ramp, 1.91 by 2.3 metres (6 ft 3 in × 7 ft 7 in), can take a 3,050-kilogram (6,720 lb) load, allowing it to carry vehicles such as Land Rovers. The ramp and cabin floor are fitted with flush tie-down points. A cargo hook under the fuselage can carry external loads of 5,440 kilograms (11,990 lb) via the use of a semi-automatic cargo release unit (SACRU). A rescue hoist and a hover trim controller are fitted at the cargo door. An optional cargo winch can be installed near to the rear ramp.

== Operational history ==
=== Royal Navy ===
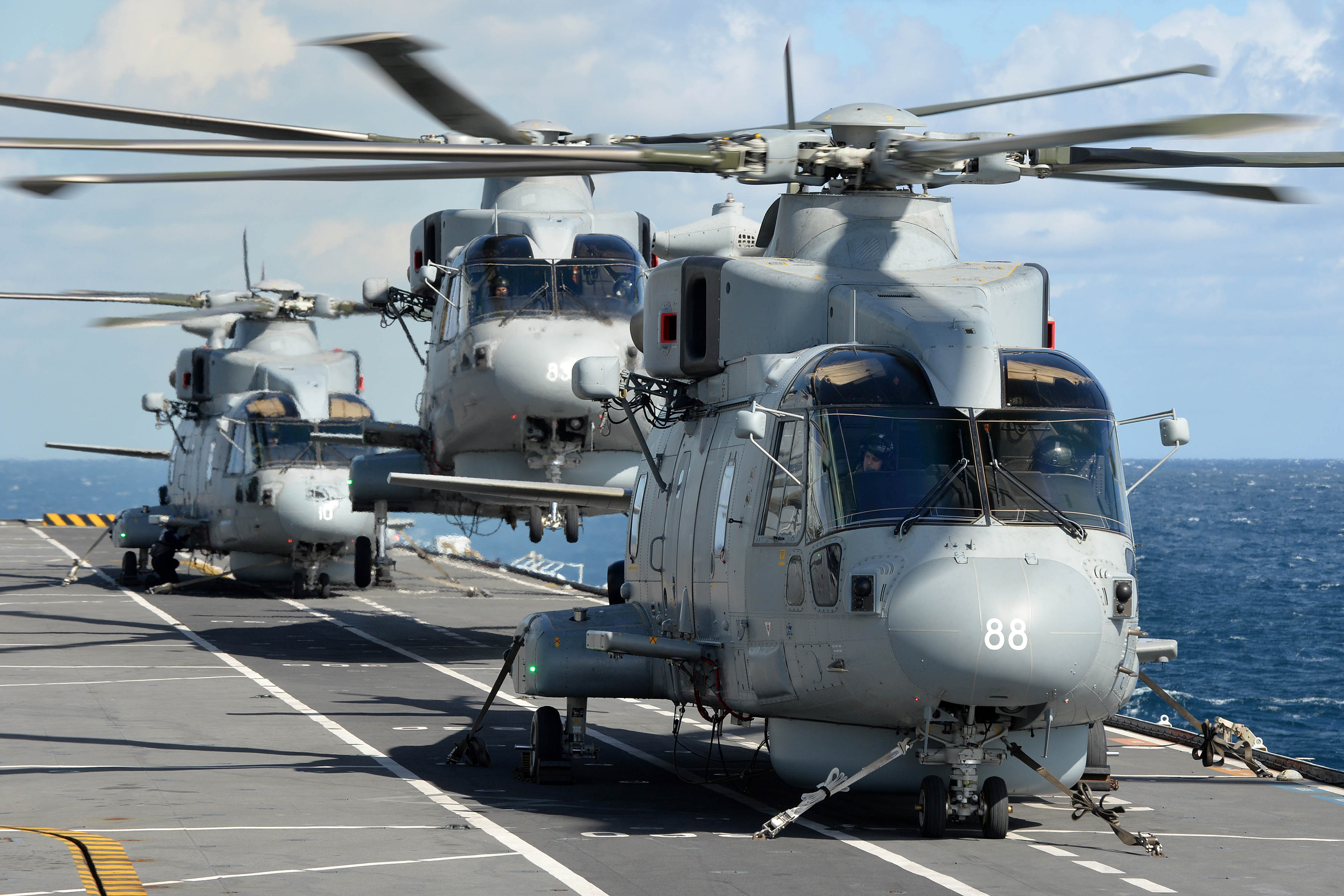
Merlin HM2 on HMS Illustrious

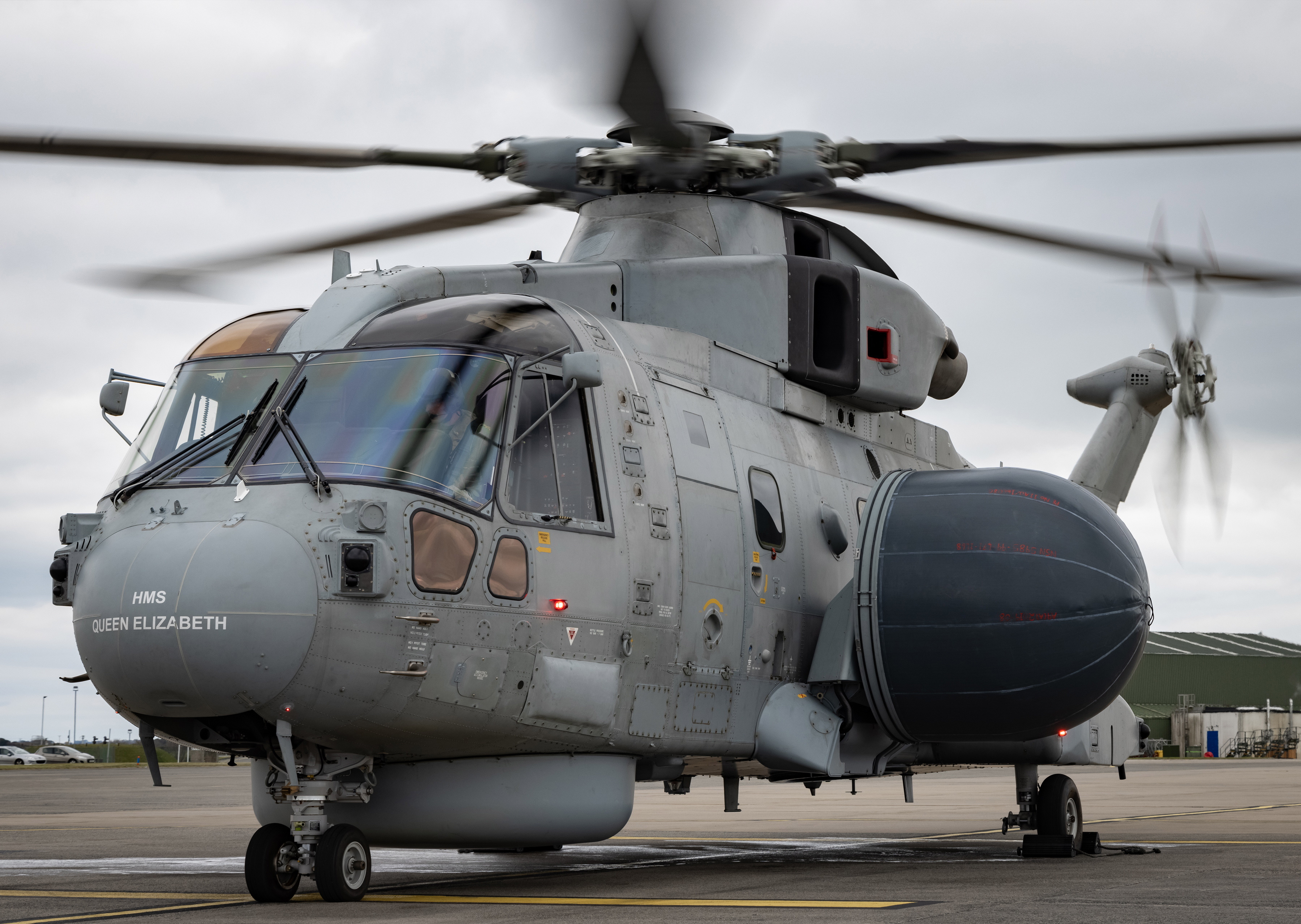
A Merlin HM2 fitted with Crowsnest

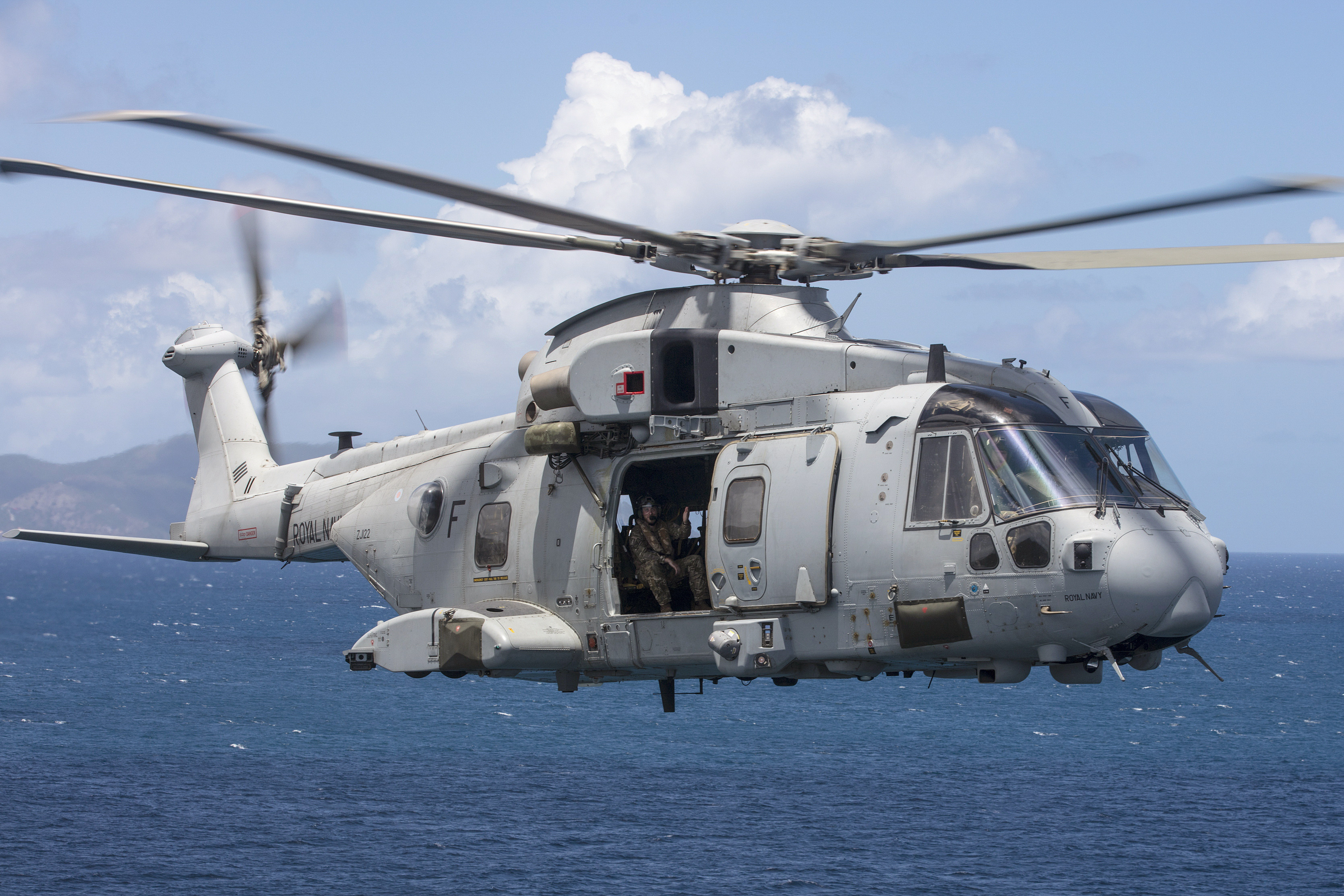
Merlin HC4 of 845 NAS off the BVI, 2020

The British Royal Navy's final order was for 44 ASW aircraft, originally designated Merlin HAS.1 (Helicopter, Anti-Submarine Mark 1) but soon changed to Merlin HM1 (Helicopter, Maritime Mark 1). The first fully operational Merlin was delivered on 17 May 1997, entering service on 2 June 2000. All aircraft were delivered by the end of 2002, and are operated by 3 Fleet Air Arm squadrons: 814 NAS, 820 NAS, 824 NAS and 829 NAS (now disbanded and merged with 814 NAS), all based at RNAS Culdrose in Cornwall. 700 NAS was the Merlin Operational Evaluation Unit from 2000 to 2008. In March 2004, Navy Merlins were temporarily grounded following an incident at RNAS Culdrose in which a tail rotor failed due to a manufacturing defect. An improved tail rotor was designed and adopted on most AW101s which significantly reduced associated maintenance.

In 1995, it was announced that the Navy's Westland Lynx helicopters would be retired in favour of an all-Merlin fleet. However, the subsequent Strategic Defence and Security Review 2010 stated that the future naval helicopters would be the Merlin and the Wildcat, a derivative of the Lynx. Royal Navy Merlins have seen action in the Caribbean, on counter-narcotics and hurricane support duties, as well as maritime security duties in the Persian Gulf. Merlins have also seen active duty in Iraq, providing support to British and coalition forces based in the region.

The Merlin HM1 has been cleared to operate from the Royal Navy's aircraft carriers, amphibious assault ships, Type 23 frigates, Type 45 destroyer and several Royal Fleet Auxiliary (RFA) vessels including the Fort Victoria class. 30 aircraft have been upgraded to Merlin HM2 standard under the £750m Merlin Capability Sustainment Programme; Lockheed Martin UK delivered the final HM2 on 11 July 2016. The HM2 has a new mission system, digital cockpit, electro-optical camera and multi-static sonar processing. The HM2 achieved IOC on 30 June 2014 after flying 480 hours from Illustrious during Exercise Deep Blue earlier that month. It was also reported that some of the eight airframes not scheduled to be upgraded for financial reasons may be updated. Five HM2s are in maintenance at a time, leaving 25 available, of which 14 were theoretically to be assigned to the Queen Elizabeth-class aircraft carrier. However, in practice with just 30 Merlin HM2s in service, it may be impossible to deploy 14 aircraft on a single operational carrier on a full time basis. During the 2021 carrier strike group deployment to the Pacific, for instance, seven Merlins were embarked with the task group.

In addition to its ASW role, the HM2 will be able to carry an airborne early warning (AEW) pod known as the Crowsnest, replacing the Sea King ASaC7. In September 2011, Thales UK proposed re-using Sea King ASaC7 equipment, such as the Searchwater 2000, on the Merlin; Lockheed Martin has proposed developing a new multi-functional sensor for both the AW101 and other aircraft. Lockheed originally planned to use a derivative of the F-35's APG-81 radar; however, a rival Elta system and the Thales system both commenced flight trials in 2014. On 22 May 2015, the MOD and prime contractor Lockheed Martin UK selected Thales to provide the radar and mission system for the Crowsnest. Initial operating capability of the system was significantly delayed. While Crowsnest was deployed with the UK carrier strike group in 2021, it experienced operating challenges and revised plans meant that Crowsnest achieved initial operating capability in July 2023. Full operating capability had been expected in 2024/25. It was reported that initially only five Merlins will be equipped with Crowsnest, three of these being normally assigned to the "high readiness" aircraft carrier. In 2025, nine Merlin HM2s from 820 Naval Air Squadron were specifically assigned to embark on HMS Prince of Wales as part of the Royal Navy's carrier strike group deployment to the Indo-Pacific region. Six of the Merlins were in the ASW role and three in the AEW role, with the Crowsnest system having formally reached full operating capability.

Problems with Merlin/Crowsnest have caused the Royal Navy to look for a replacement. As of 2023 the system had a planned retirement date of 2029. In 2021, the UK's Defence and Security Accelerator (DASA) announced that options would be examined and might draw on the already existing Project Vixen, researching the utility of a naval unmanned system that could encompass strike, AEW, and air-to-air refuelling components. If implemented, the replacement of Merlin/Crowsnest by another system would permit all Merlin helicopters to focus on ASW operations for the remainder of their service lives.

On 15 December 2009, plans were announced to transfer RAF Merlin HC3s and HC3As to the Royal Navy's Commando Helicopter Force to replace retiring Sea King HC4 helicopters. The Sea King was set to retire in 2016, leaving the Navy operating a combination of the Wildcat and Merlin. 846 NAS reformed with ex-RAF Merlin HC3s on 30 September 2014; 845 NAS followed on 9 July 2015. On 25 May 2018, the first of 25 converted Royal Marines Commando Merlin Mk4/4A were delivered to Royal Naval Air Station (RNAS) Yeovilton. In July 2020, the Merlin HM2 and HC4/4A helicopters were planned to be in service until 2029 and 2030, respectively. On 11 June 2021, it was confirmed that their Out of Service Date (OSD) had been moved to 2040. By the end of 2022, all HC helicopters were upgraded to the HC4/4A Commando Merlin standard.

=== Royal Air Force ===
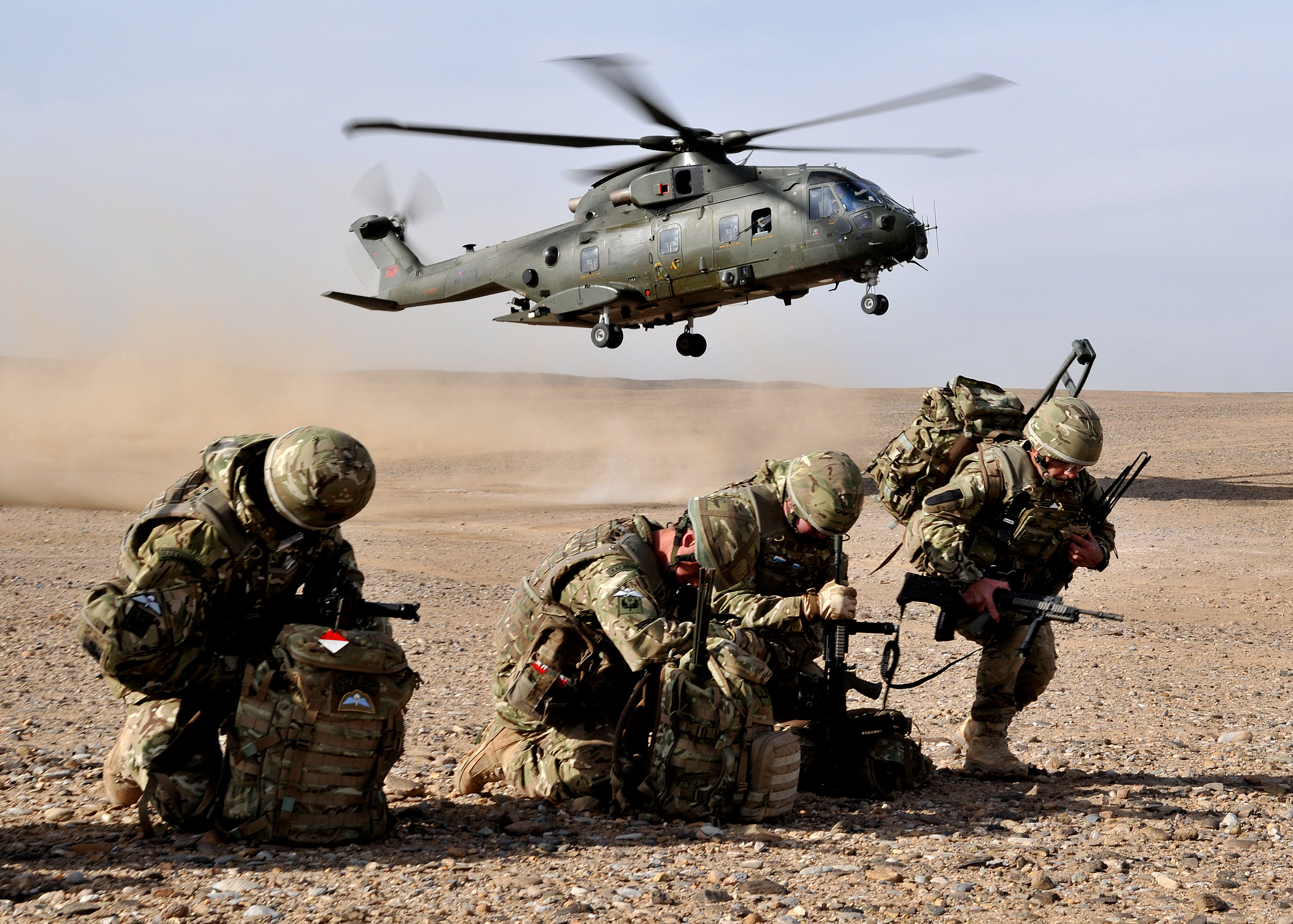
Merlin HC3 picking up members of No. II Squadron RAF Regiment Afghanistan, 2012

The RAF ordered 22 Merlin HC3 for transport missions, the first of which entered service in January 2001 with No. 28 Squadron RAF based at RAF Benson. The type is equipped with extended-range fuel tanks and is capable of air-to-air refuelling. The Merlin is frequently utilised for troop transport duties and for the transport of bulky objects, either internally or underslung, including vehicles and artillery. The Merlin Depth Maintenance Facility at RNAS Culdrose performed most tasks upon the Merlin HC3.

The Merlin's first operational deployment was to the Balkans region in 2003. RAF Merlins were first deployed to Iraq as part of Operation Telic in 2004, supporting coalition forces and were operated as the main medevac asset in southern Iraq; both Flight Lieutenant Kev Harris and Flight Lieutenant Michelle Goodman were awarded the DFC during this period. Merlins routinely operated around Basra until Britain's withdrawal in June 2009.

In 2002, Westland made an unsuccessful unsolicited offer to the British Ministry of Defence, proposing an enhanced Merlin variant intended to satisfy the demand for additional lift capacity. An alternative measure was the acquisition of six AW101s from Denmark in 2007; designated Merlin HC3A, these were assigned to the RAF, allowing Merlins to be deployed in Afghanistan. The HC3A is used for training and not for frontline operations due to various configuration differences. In December 2007, a second Merlin squadron, No. 78 Squadron was formed at RAF Benson.

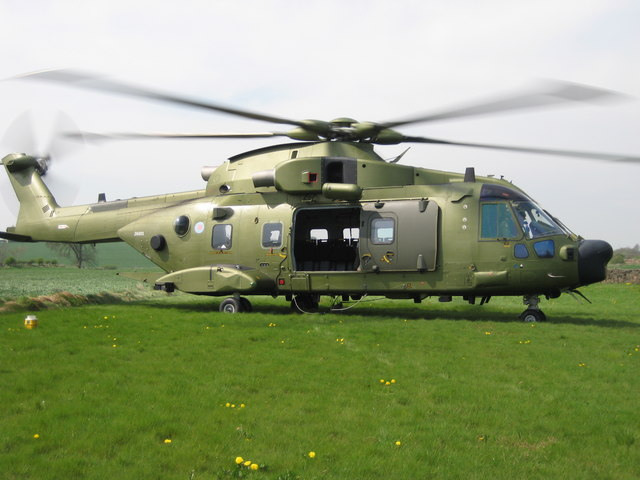
RAF Merlin HC3A, 2008

In 2009, five Merlin Mk3s were operating in Afghanistan, transporting troops and supplies. The deployment to Afghanistan was criticised as the aircraft reportedly lacked protective Kevlar armour. By July 2010, the Merlin fleet was fully fitted with ballistic armour. The deployment of Merlins to Afghanistan allowed the detachment of Sea Kings to be withdrawn from the region in October 2011. As part of the UK drawdown in Afghanistan, Merlins were withdrawn from theatre in June 2013.

In 2012, the RAF's Merlin HC3/3A fleet began to be transferred to the Royal Navy for use by the Commando Helicopter Force. Royal Navy personnel worked alongside RAF crew at Benson to build experience during the transition. The £454m Merlin Life Sustainment Programme resulted in 25 HC3/3A airframes being fitted with the cockpit electronics of the HM2, folding tails and main rotor heads, strengthened landing gear, deck lashing mounting points, obsolescence updates, fast-roping points and a common emergency egress system. The first HC4 began flight trials in September 2017, with an IOC in mid-2018; an interim folding main rotor head will be fitted to some HC3 for shipborne operations prior to the HC4 upgrade.

Command of the UK Merlin HC3/3A fleet was formally transferred from the RAF to the Royal Navy during a ceremony at RAF Benson on 30 September 2014. As part of the same ceremony, the RAF's 78 Sqn was disbanded and the Royal Navy's 846 Naval Air Squadron stood-up with the Merlin. The RAF's 28(AC) continued to operate as part of the Commando Helicopter Force until July 2015, when 28(AC) Sqn stood down and 845 Naval Air Squadron stood-up. 846 NAS relocated from RAF Benson to RNAS Yeovilton in March 2015, with 845 NAS following in June 2016.

=== Italian Navy ===
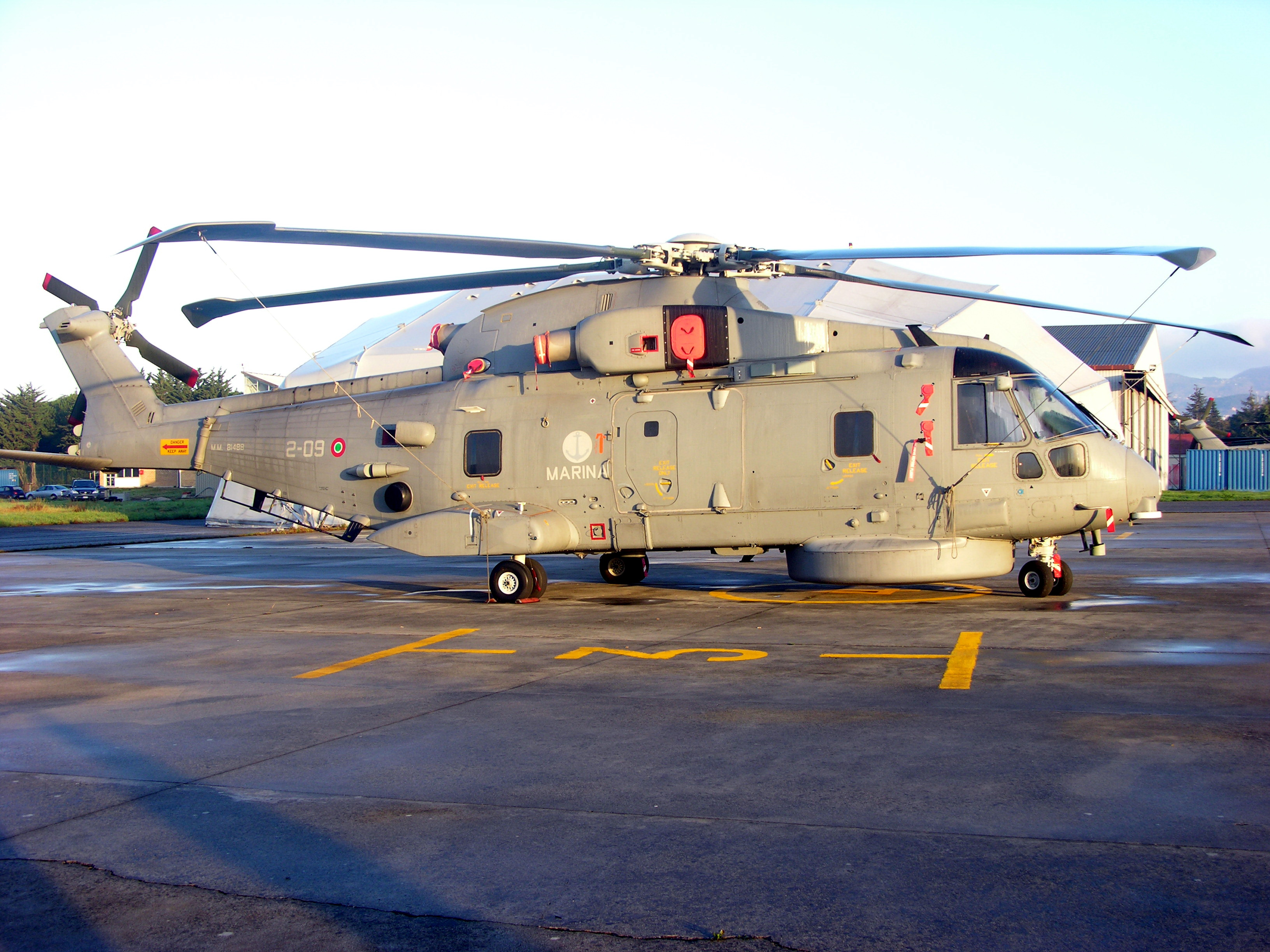
Italian Navy airborne early warning (AEW) variant at Luni-Sarzana, 2007

In 1997, the Italian government ordered 16 AW101 helicopters for the Italian Navy, with options for four more. These AW101 included eight of the anti-surface/submarine (ASuW/ASW) version, four airborne early warning (AEW), four amphibious support helicopters (ASH). The government then exercised its option for four additional ASH helicopters, which were delivered by 2006. The same year the government ordered two more AW101 ASH helicopters in a slightly modified version.

The first Italian Navy production helicopter (MM81480) flew on 4 October 1999 and was officially presented to the press on 6 December 1999. Italy accepted delivery of the 21st AW101, configured for anti-submarine warfare, on 4 August 2009. In total 22 AW101 helicopters have been delivered to the Italian Navy.

Italian AW101s have operated from a variety of ships and have seen service overseas; in 2009 the Italian Navy used its AW101 fleet as executive transports for visiting heads of state and officials during the 35th G8 summit. In 2010, the Italian Navy deployed three AW101s to Afghanistan, where they were flown in both the transport and utility roles. In 2011, it was reported that the Italian contingent in Afghanistan, consisting of AW101s, had been providing coverage of a wide area of the country.

=== Italian Air Force ===
In June 2011 the AW101 was chosen by the Italian Air Force to replace its ageing Sea King HH-3F helicopters in the combat search and rescue role. A total of 15 helicopters in the HH-101A variant were ordered and delivered between 2016 and 2020.

=== Royal Canadian Air Force ===
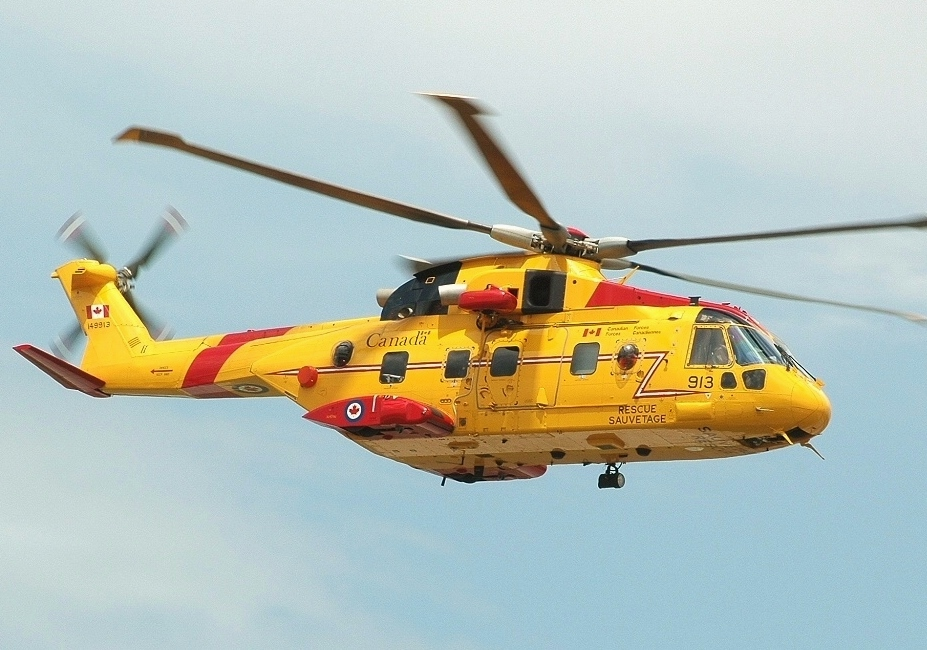
RCAF CH-149 Cormorant

In 1997, in light of the declining condition of its helicopter fleet, Canada launched the Canadian Search and Rescue Helicopter competition. It was won by the EH101, which was designated CH-149 Cormorant in Canadian service.

In 2004, the EH101 was entered into a Canadian competition to replace the shipboard Sea King fleet, but the Sikorsky CH-148 Cyclone was selected. In 2013, following difficulties with the CH-148 procurement, the Royal Canadian Air Force (RCAF) was reported to be seriously considering cancelling the contract with Sikorsky and was investigating the possibility of procuring the AW101 instead. However, an initial batch of six Cyclones was delivered to the RCAF in June 2015.

In December 2022, Canada's Department of National Defence announced a C$1.24-billion contract for procurement of three additional aircraft and upgrades to the existing fleet to current configuration of the helicopter; this will increase the fleet to 16 aircraft. The RCAF also acquired its own advanced training simulator configured to the new modernised cockpit.

=== Royal Danish Air Force ===
In 2001, the Royal Danish Air Force (RDAF) announced the purchase of eight EH101s for SAR duties and six tactical troop transports for 722 Squadron. The last of the 14 AW101s was delivered in March 2007 and the first SAR AW101s became operational out of Karup Airport in April 2007. In 2007, the six troop transport AW101s were transferred to the British MOD; in exchange, the British government ordered six new-build AW101s as replacements for the RDAF.

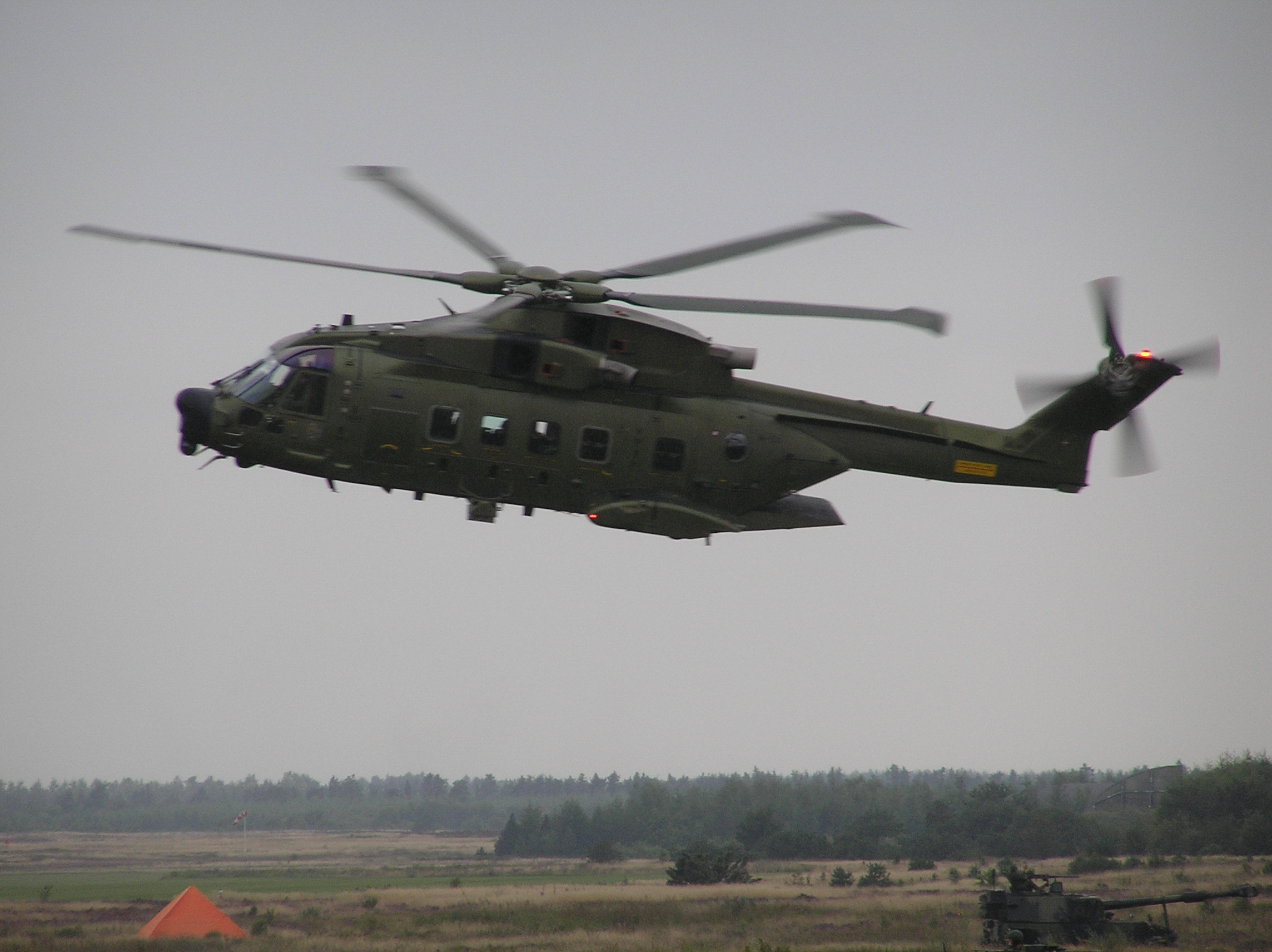
RDAF AW101, 2007

Danish AW101s have a higher gross weight capacity of 15,600 kg and were, as delivered, coated in a paint designed to reduce the aircraft's infrared signature. In the SAR role, RDAF AW101s have a crew of six and were initially painted yellow to distinguish themselves from AW101 allocated to military duties, but were later painted green, and all 14 AW101s are used for SAR and troop transport.

On 28 January 2008, the drive shaft of a Danish AW101 broke, leading to an emergency landing at Billund Airport. Following the incident, the Danish fleet was grounded as a precaution and the AW101's future was publicly debated. In the first six months of 2008, the RDAF reported an operational availability of roughly 50%, well below the target of 80%, partly due to an inadequate maintenance organisation and staff shortages.

In January 2011, the Danish Ministry of Defence reportedly could not afford the retrofitting of the AW101 fleet for Afghanistan operations, against earlier reports of a deployment in 2012. In February 2013, Aviation Week reported that earlier reliability problems had been resolved and that a full upgrade package would be applied to Danish AW101s; these included the addition of electronic warfare pods and a new electro-optical system, in advance of a deployment in Afghanistan in 2014. In September 2013, Danish AW101s were to receive L-3 Wescam MX-15 electro-optical/infrared (EO/IR) sensors; SAR aircraft already carry the FLIR Systems Star Safire II EO/IR sensor.

=== Royal Norwegian Air Force ===
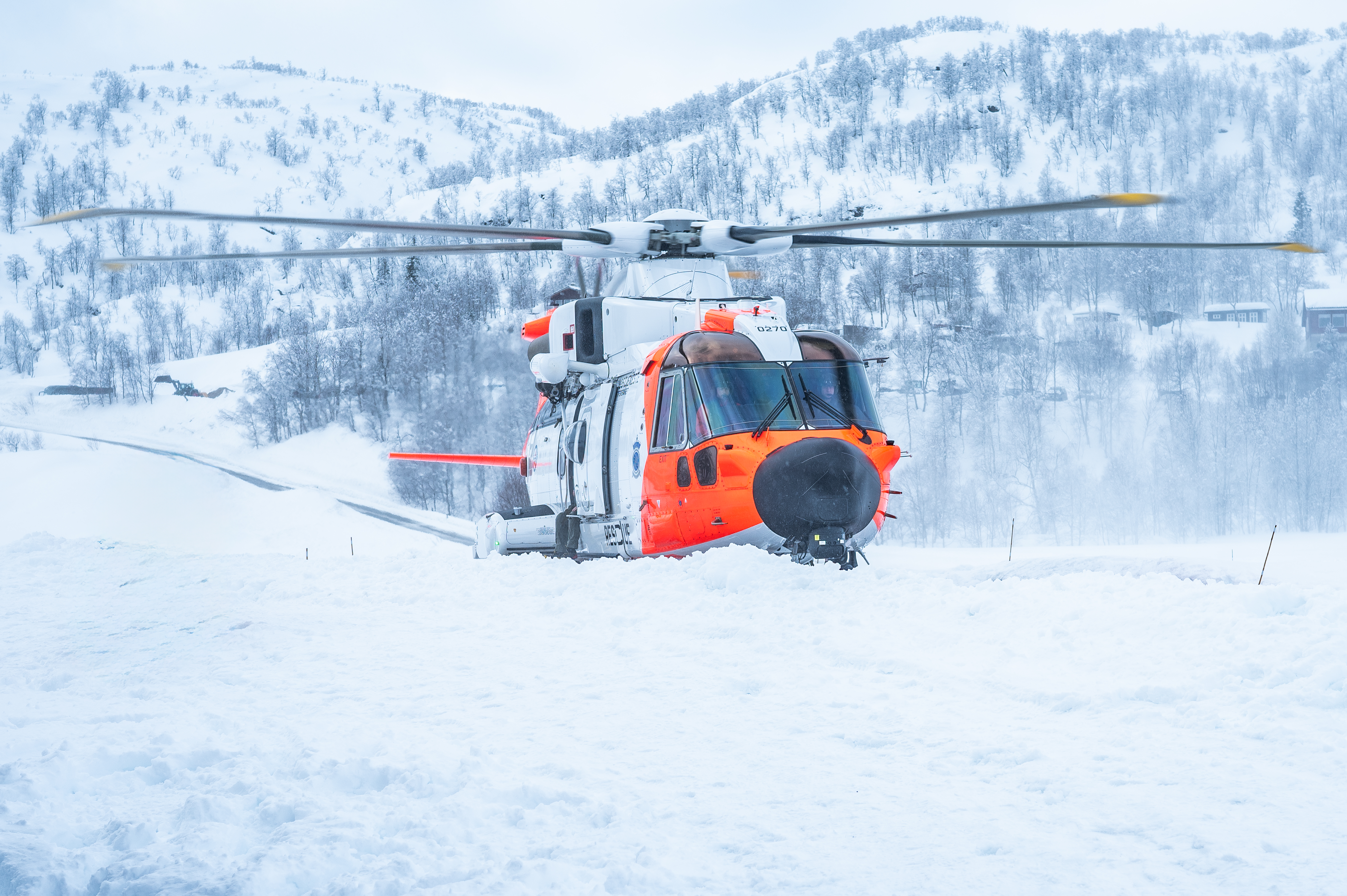
A Norwegian Leonardo AW101 SAR Queen helicopter, 2024

On 25 October 2007, a project started that had the intent to replace all Westland Sea King search and rescue helicopters with new rescue helicopters by 2020. On 19 December 2013, a contract was signed between AgustaWestland and the government, for the purchase of 16 AW101 helicopters. The agreement came about after fierce competition between different manufacturers to satisfy the Norwegian requirements. Participants were AgustaWestland, Eurocopter, NHIndustries, Sikorsky Aircraft Corporation and Boeing. The government considered that AgustaWestland AW101 met the requirements and specifications in the best possible way.

On 12 June 2017, Per-Willy Amundsen, Minister of Justice and Public Security, announced the opening of Leonardo's AW101 Norway Training Centre at Stavanger Sola Air Station. The training centre includes an AW101 Full Flight Simulator (FFS), jointly developed by Leonardo and CAE to Level D, which is a CAE Series 3000 device, along with an AW101 SAR console training system linked to the FFS to provide rear crew training. The first training course at the centre started prior to delivery of the first rotorcraft. The training centre will be used by both Norwegian and foreign AW101 customers.

The first AW101 was delivered in November 2017. The Norwegian AW101s officially started operating in the rescue role on 1 September 2020. The Sea King was phased out in December 2023, after 47 years of service as rescue helicopter in the Royal Norwegian Air force, and replaced with the AW101. The AW101 is named SAR Queen in Norwegian service, and performed the 486 nmi (900 km) flight from Mainland Bodø to Jan Mayensfield using two engines, and then back, in 2025.

=== Portuguese Air Force ===
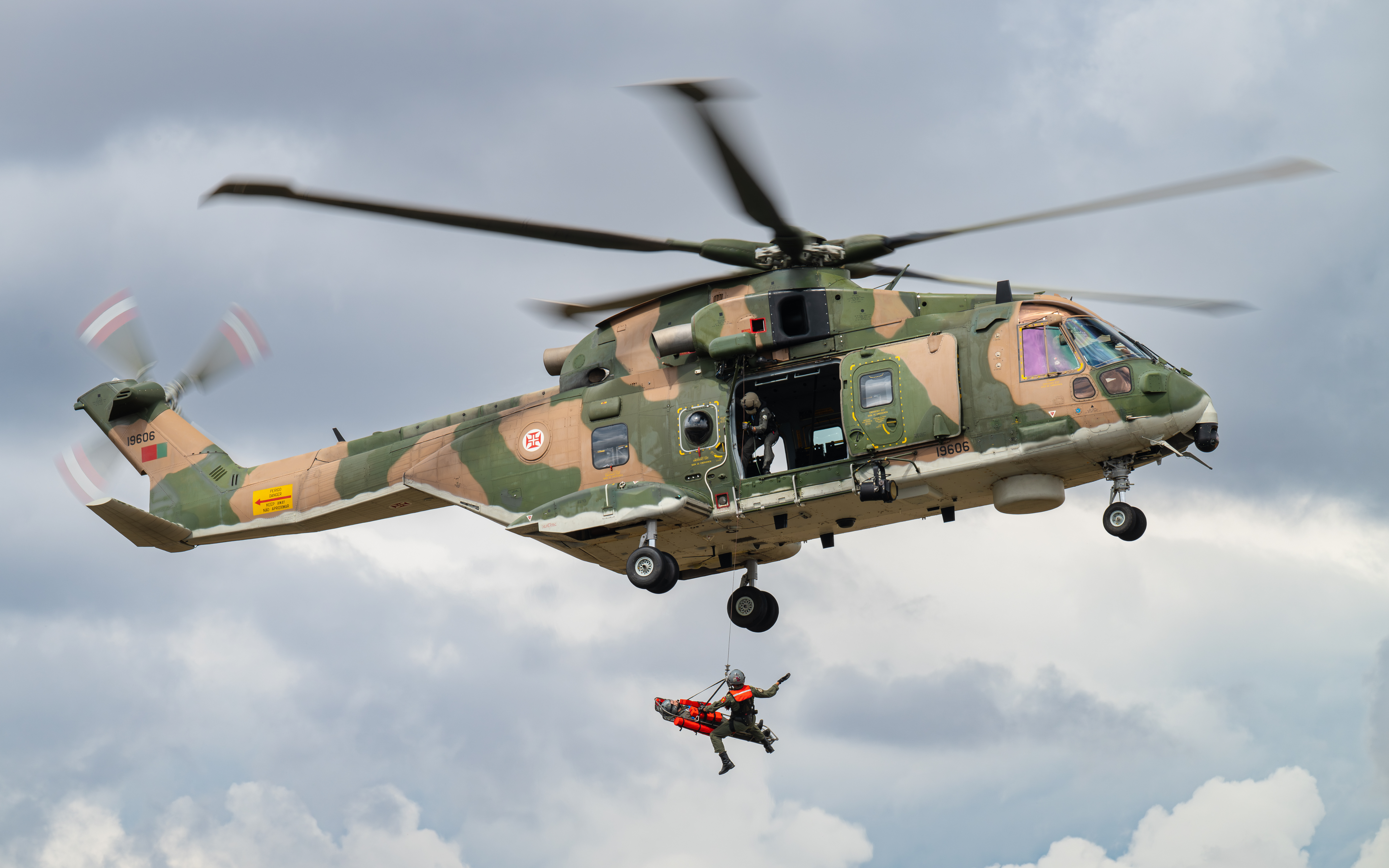
AW101 Merlin Helicopter of 751 Squadron Portuguese Air Force

The Portuguese Air Force had purchased 12 Merlins under a €446 million contract, the first of which was delivered on 22 December 2004. The type has been used to conduct transport, search and rescue, and maritime surveillance missions, progressively replacing the Aérospatiale Puma previously tasked with these missions. The main role of Portuguese AW101s is to perform search and rescue missions within Portugal's maritime zone. They are operated by 751 Squadron and are kept on constant alert at three bases: Montijo near Lisbon, Lajes Field on the Azores, and Porto Santo Island.

=== Japan Maritime Self-Defense Force ===
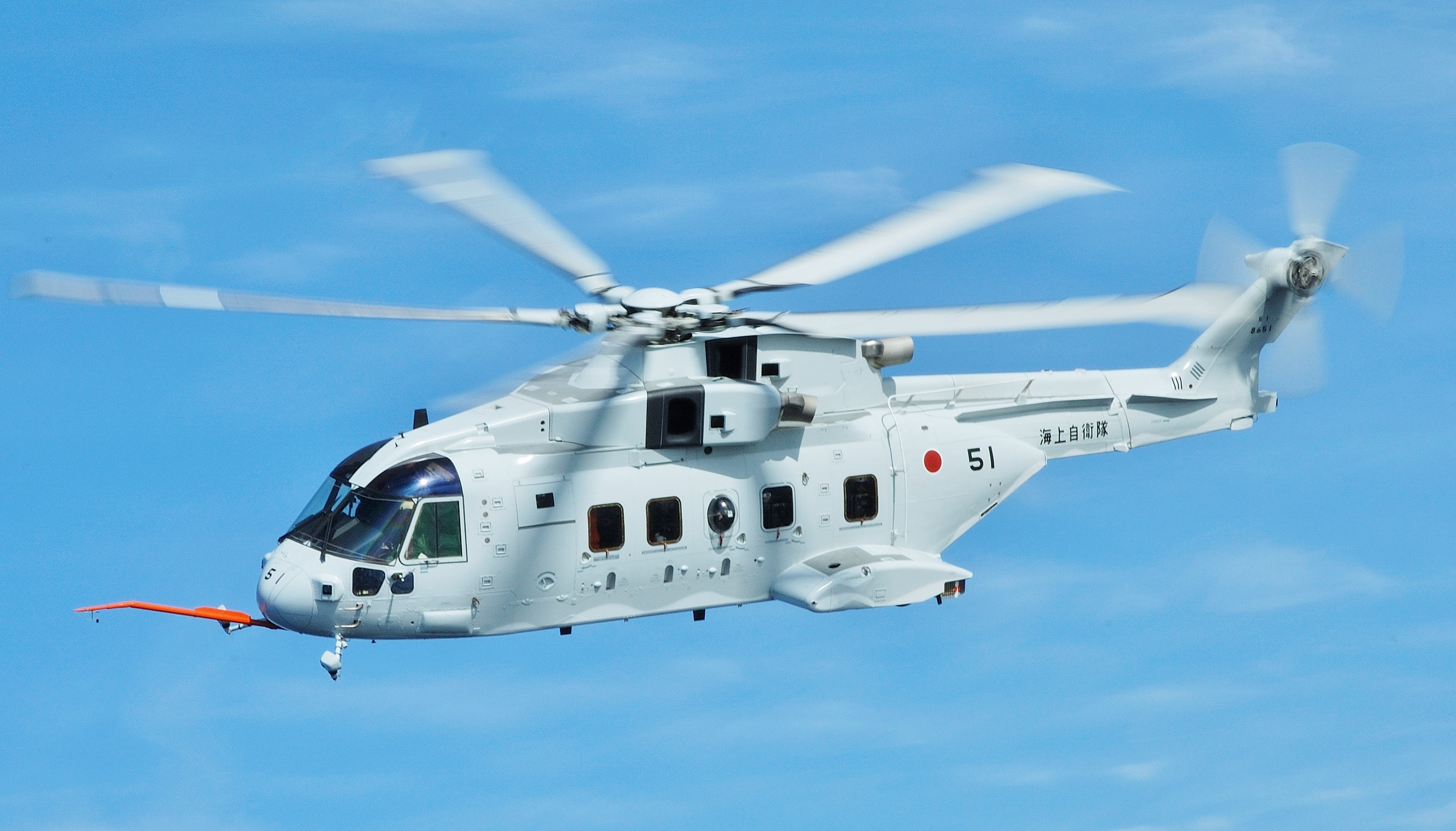
Japanese MCH-101

The Japan Maritime Self-Defense Force (JMSDF) ordered 14 aircraft in 2003 to use in both the airborne mine countermeasures (AMCM) and transport roles. The AW101 was modified by Kawasaki Heavy Industries, and the Japan Defense Agency designated the model MCH-101. Special features include the automated folding of the rotor and tail. For the mine-hunting role, the MCH-101 has been outfitted with Northrop Grumman's AQS-24A airborne mine-hunting system and AN/AES-1 Airborne Laser Mine Detection System (ALMDS) for a complete surface-to-bottom mine detection capability, as well as Mk-104 acoustic mine sweeping gear.

In 2002, AgustaWestland, Kawasaki and Marubeni entered a general agreement for cooperation; Kawasaki began the assembly of both the CH-101 and the MCH-101 in 2003. Kawasaki also began licensed production of the RTM322 engines in 2005. In a separate agreement between Marubeni and AgustaWestland, a supply depot was established in Japan to support the MCH-101 and CH-101 fleets. The first MCH-101 was delivered to the JMSDF on 3 March 2006.

The MCH-101 will replace the MH-53E (S-80-M-1) in the AMCM role. The CH-101 will operate in the transport/support role for Antarctic expeditions, replacing the Sikorsky S-61A, and will be working in coordination with the Ministry of Education, Culture, Sports, Science and Technology.

After a whistle-blower alleged that the MSDF's preference had been improperly changed an investigation was launched. On 16 December 2016 the Japanese Ministry of Defense (the Defense Agency having been upgraded to a ministry in 2007) stated that it had not confirmed lobbying efforts but the ministry admonished Tomohisa Takei, the JMSDF chief of staff, for mentioning the MCH-101 by name during the procurement process to his subordinates. This had come after MSDF officials had reported that the Mitsubishi-built SH helicopters may be best.

=== VIP and other usage ===
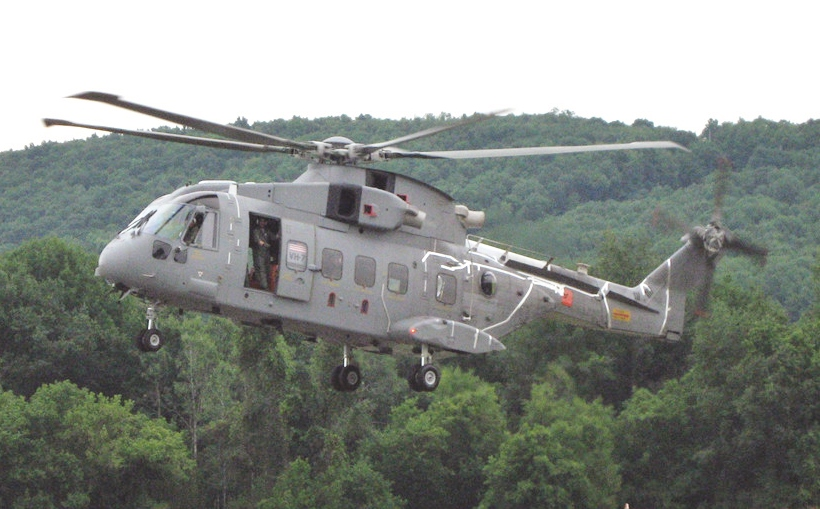
AW101 (VH-71) undergoing testing in Owego, New York

AgustaWestland developed a specialised luxury variant, the AW101 VVIP (Very Very Important Person, i.e. a head of state), aimed at business and VIP customers. As of April 2009, 15% of all AW101s sold were for VIP purposes. By September 2013, customers operating the VIP variant included Saudi Arabia, Algeria, Nigeria and Turkmenistan.

The AW101 was being acquired by the United States Marine Corps under the VXX program as a replacement for the Presidential Marine One helicopters. Designated VH-71 Kestrel, the variant was heavily customised and equipped with various self-defence systems. However the programme encountered significant cost overruns and political opposition, which led to the procurement being scrapped in June 2009. After the cancellation, the delivered helicopters were sold to Canada for $164 million, where they were used as source of spare parts for its fleet of AgustaWestland CH-149 Cormorant search-and-rescue helicopters. Separately, the Marine Corps had also conducted studies into the adoption of the EH101 as a fall-back option to the Bell-Boeing V-22 Osprey tiltrotor during the 1990s.

In April 2009, India ordered 12 AW101 to serve as executive transport helicopters for the Indian president and prime minister. The selection followed field trial assessments between the AW101 and the Sikorsky S-92 held in 2008. However, the procurement was put on hold and subsequently cancelled due to the 2013 Indian helicopter bribery scandal, in which Finmeccanica, AgustaWestland's parent company, was accused of using bribery to win the contract. The three helicopters delivered as part of the contract may be returned to the manufacturer as part of the arbitration process.

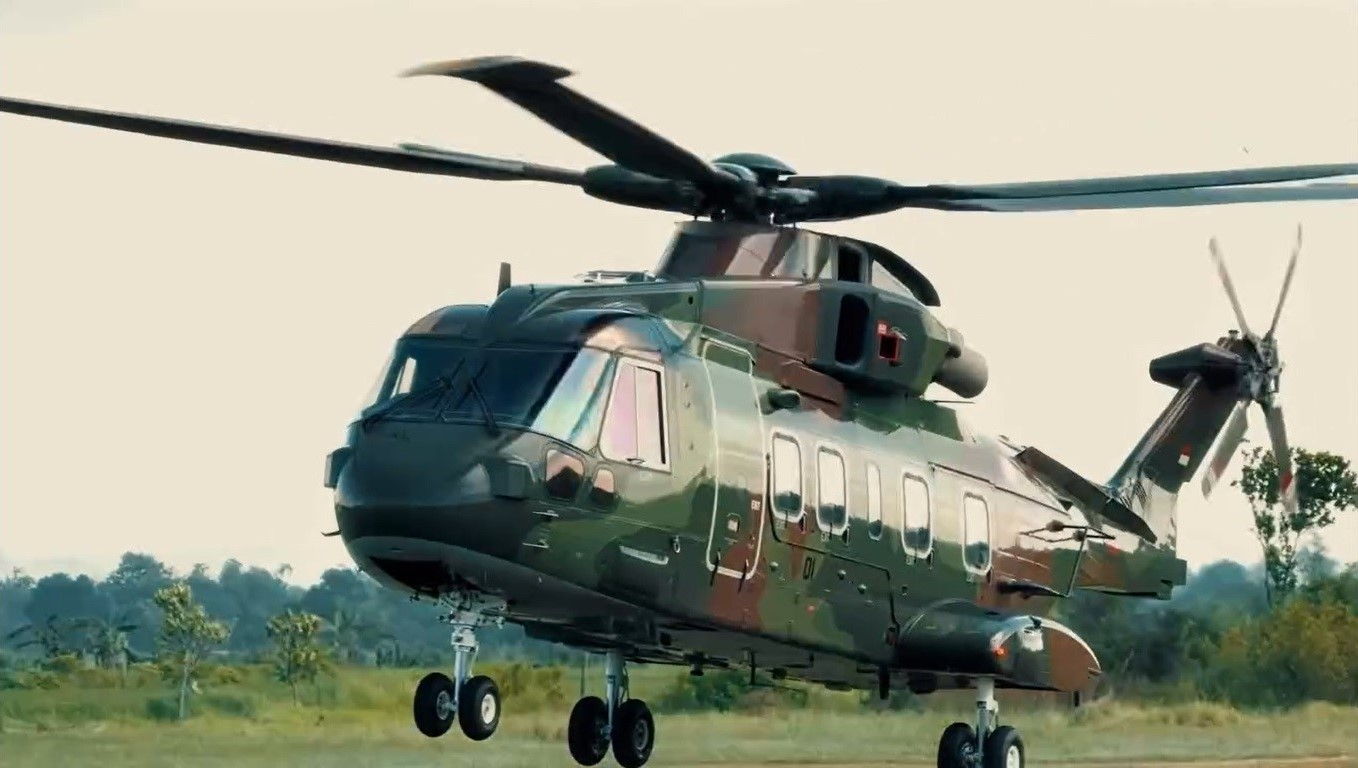
Indonesian Air Force AW101 landed at a field in Lamongan, April 2026

The Indonesian Air Force planned to order three AW101 for presidential and VVIP transport purpose in November 2015. The contract was valued at US$165 million, or US$55 million for each unit. Behind the scene, the Air Force chief Marshal Agus Supriatna contacted Leonardo via a middleman for the AW101 procurement. To expedite the order, Leonardo representative offered AW101 from the cancelled Indian orders. The procurement plan was criticised by local politicians and experts, as the locally-license built Super Puma helicopter was more affordable at US$40 million per unit, has lower maintenance cost, and it would boost local employment. The Indonesian president Joko Widodo decreed the cancellation of AW101 procurement in December 2015 due to its cost. Despite the presidential decree, the air force is still keen to procure AW101, which in July 2016 revised the proposal into SAR and military purpose. The proposal was opposed by the Commander of the Armed Forces General Gatot Nurmantyo. Marshal Agus Supriatna successfully lobbied members of parliament to fund the procurement. One AW101 was delivered to Indonesia in January–February 2017. As it was discovered that the particular helicopter was from the cancelled Indian Air Force VVIP order and did not have the features necessary for SAR missions, the helicopter was subsequently stored in a hangar as court evidence. In May 2017, three military officers were identified as suspects in the corruption case which cost the state US$17 million. In 2023, the middleman was sentenced to 10 years in prison due to the scandal. The single AW101 started to enter service in 2024.

=== Potential operators ===
It was announced in 2025 that the Royal Norwegian Air Force is considering ordering the AW101 Merlins for anti-submarine use.

In 2023, Leonardo Helicopters proposed a mixed AW101 fleet configuration to Turkey, consisting of approximately 25 anti-submarine warfare (ASW) variants for the Turkish Naval Forces and 6 search and rescue (SAR) / coast guard variants for the Turkish Coast Guard Command. The ASW helicopters were proposed in a configuration broadly similar to the Royal Navy Merlin HM2 standard, featuring modular mission systems capable of anti-submarine and anti-surface warfare operations. The proposal also included a reference to a Crowsnest-type airborne early warning (AEW) system, although such systems are normally fielded in small numbers and rotated among aircraft. As of available reports, no contract has been signed and the proposal remains at the discussion stage.

== Variants ==
Pre-production

- PP1 – Westland-built basic air vehicle prototype, first flown 9 October 1987.
- PP2 – Agusta-built Italian basic air vehicle prototype first flown on 26 November 1987 and used for deck trials but was destroyed on 21 January 1993 following a rotor brake malfunction.
- PP3 – Westland-built and the first civil configured Heliliner, used for engine vibration tests and icing trials in Canada.
- PP4 – Westland-built British naval prototype, lost in an accident on 7 April 1995 after a drive train control rod failure.
- PP5 – Westland-built Merlin development aircraft eventually equipped with Merlin avionics.
- PP6 – Agusta-built development aircraft for Italian Navy variant first flown 26 April 1989.
- PP7 – Agusta-built military utility aircraft with rear-loading ramp.
- PP8 – Westland-built civil prototype.
- PP9 – Agusta-built military utility prototype with rear-loading ramp.

Model 110
Italian Navy ASW/ASuW variant, eight built. Powered by T-700-GE-T6A1 engines. Fitted with Eliradar APS-784 radar and Honeywell HELRAS dipping sonar. Armed with torpedoes or Marte anti-ship missiles.

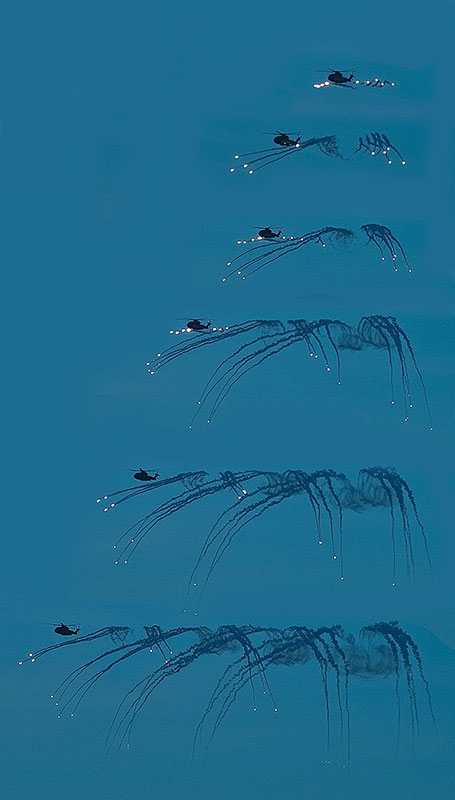
Composite image of an RAF Merlin deploying flares

Model 111
Royal Navy ASW/ASuW variant, designated Merlin HM1 by customer. Powered by RTM322 engines and fitted with Blue Kestrel radar, Thomson Marconi FLASH dipping sonar and Orange Reaper ESM. 44 built.
Model 112
Italian Navy early warning variant with same airframe as Model 110 but with Eliradar HEW-784 radar in large underfuselage radome. Four built.
Series 200
Proposed military utility version with no rear-loading ramp.
Series 300 Heliliner
Proposed civil transport with no ramp. In 2000, British International Helicopters conducted service trials using PP8; these did not lead to a commercial service.
Series 310
Proposed version of Heliliner with full airline avionics for operation from oil platforms. No production.
Model 410
Italian Navy transport variant with folding rotors and tail boom. Four built.
Model 411
Royal Air Force transport variant, designated Merlin HC3 by customer, 22 built.
Model 413
Italian Navy special forces and amphibious assault transport with more advanced avionics.
Model 500
Proposed civil utility variant with rear-ramp.
Model 510
Civil utility variant with rear ramp, two built. One used for Tokyo Metropolitan Police Agency and one used to support US101 bid.
Model 511
Canadian Armed Forces search and rescue variant, designated CH-149 Cormorant.
Model 512
Merlin Joint Supporter for Royal Danish Air Force. Eight acquired for search and rescue (512 SAR) and six for tactical troop transport (512 TTT). The six transports were sold to RAF (as Merlin HC3As) and replaced by six new-build Merlins.
Model 514
Portuguese Air Force search and rescue variant, six built.
Model 515
Portuguese Air Force fisheries protection variant, two built.
Model 516
Portuguese Air Force combat search and rescue variant, four built.
Model 518
Japanese Maritime Self-Defense Force mine countermeasures and transport variant, two built.
Model 519
Presidential Transport variant for the United States Marine Corps as the VH-71 Kestrel, four test vehicles and five pilot production aircraft built. Cancelled and aircraft sold to Royal Canadian Air Force as spares for CH-149 Cormorant fleet.
Model 610
Algerian Naval variant. 6 delivered.
Model 611
Italian Air Force Combat Search and Rescue variant, powered by CT7-8E engines. 15 on order.
Model 612 (SAR Queen)
Norwegian search and rescue variant, operated by the Air Force. 16 ordered with option for 6 more.
Model 614
Polish ASW/CSAR "convertible" variant, operated by the Polish Navy, 4 delivered.
Model 615
Canadian military search and rescue variant, upgraded -511 variant, again designated the CH-149 Cormorant. 16 to be delivered.
Model 640
Saudi Arabian VVIP variant, operated by the Air Force. 2 delivered.
Model 641
Indian VVIP variant. (See 2013 Indian helicopter bribery scandal). Latterly delivered to Nigerian and Azerbaijani Air Forces.
Model 642
Algerian VVIP variant, 2 delivered.
Model 643
Turkmenistani VVIP variant, operated by the Air Force. 2 delivered.
Merlin HM1
Royal Navy designation for the Model 111.
Merlin HM2
Avionics retrofit of 30 HM1s for the Royal Navy.

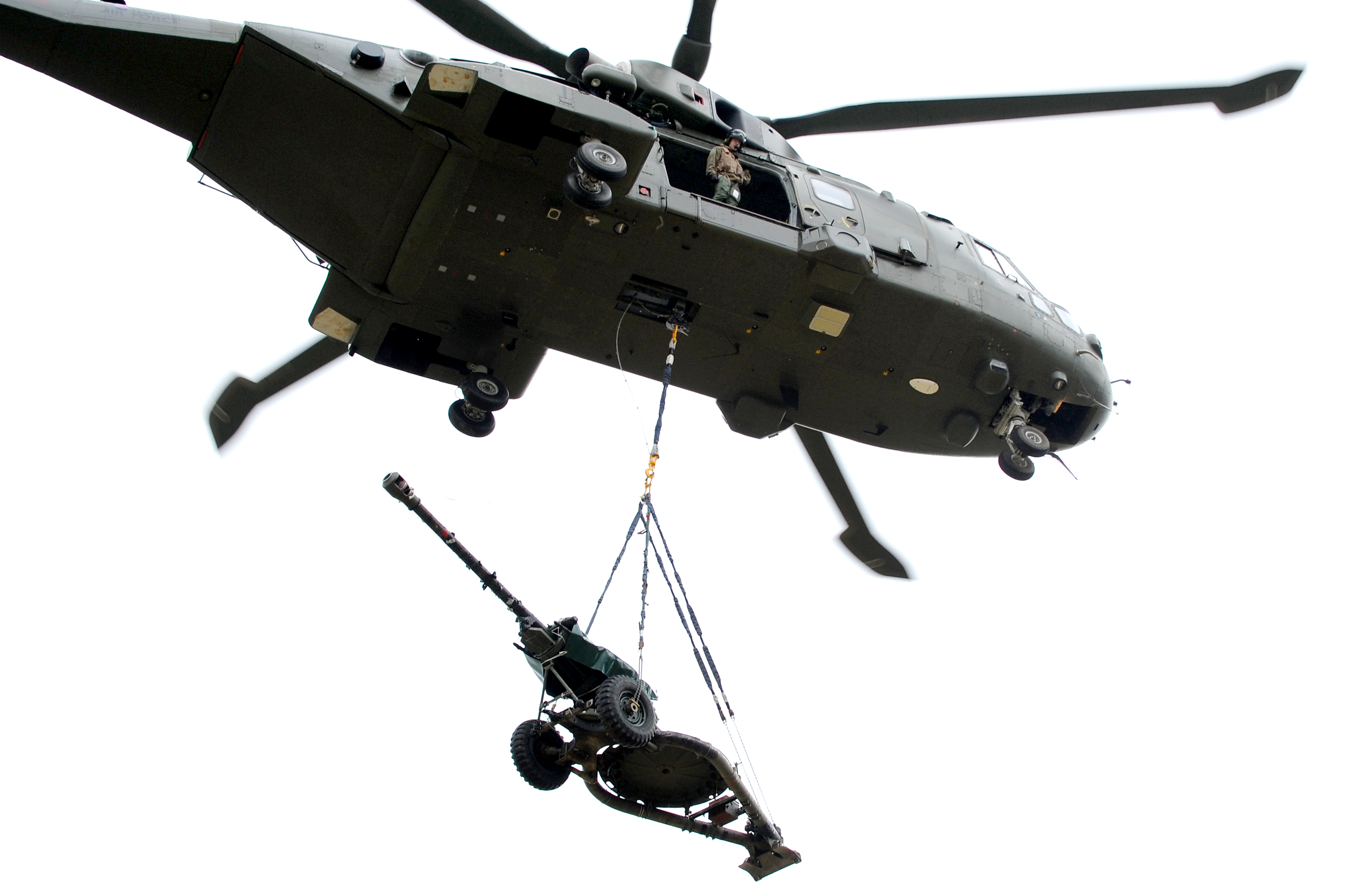
RAF Merlin carrying a L118 105 mm howitzer.

Merlin HC3
Royal Air Force designation for the Model 411.
Merlin HC3A
Royal Air Force designation for six former Royal Danish Air Force Model 512s modified to UK standards.
Merlin HC3i
Royal Navy will fit seven HC3 with folding rotor heads as an interim (3i) measure until the full HC4 upgrade is available.
Merlin HC4/4A
The conversion of 25 RAF HC3/3A (19 HC3 and 6 HC3A) for RN use in hand with the first flight taking place in November 2016. HM2 cockpit, folding tail/blades and other adaptations for naval use.
CH-148 Petrel
Ship-based anti-submarine helicopter for Canada. 35 originally ordered by the Canadian Forces, reduced to 28 and cancelled in 1993.
CH-149 Chimo
Search and rescue helicopter for Canada. 15 ordered by the Canadian forces, but later cancelled.
CH-149 Cormorant
Search and rescue helicopter for Canada, 15 ordered and delivered.
Lockheed Martin VH-71 Kestrel
Cancelled USMC variant that was intended to serve as the US Presidential helicopter.
SH-101A
Italian Navy designation for the MP variant.

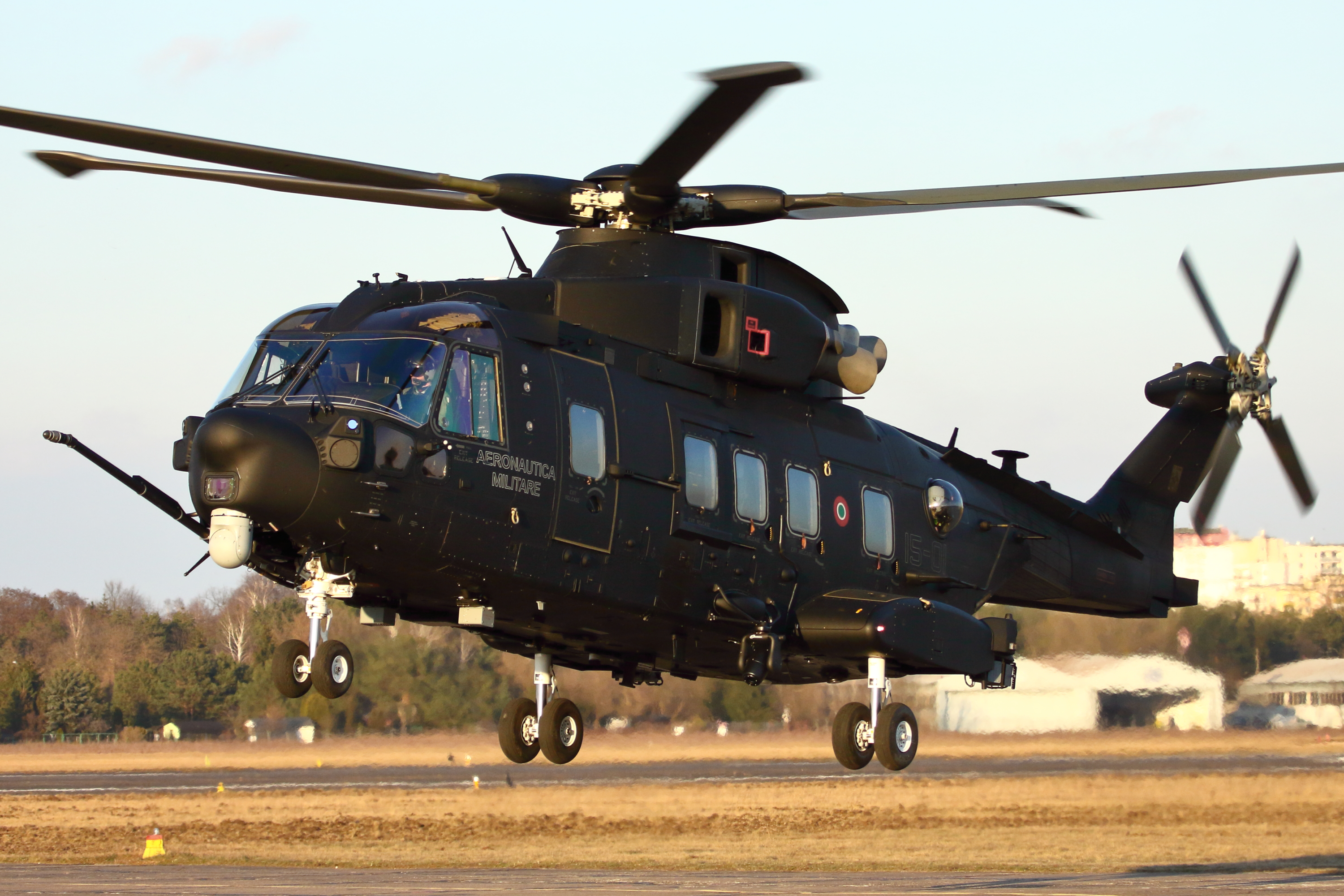
Italian Air Force HH-101A

EH-101A
Italian Navy designation for the AEW variant.
MH-101A
Italian Navy designation for the Amphibious Support Helicopter (ASH) variant.
HH-101A
Italian Air Force designation for the CSAR variant.
Kawasaki Heavy Industries MCH-101
Japan Defense Agency designation of Model 518

== Operators ==
Map of current AW101 operators

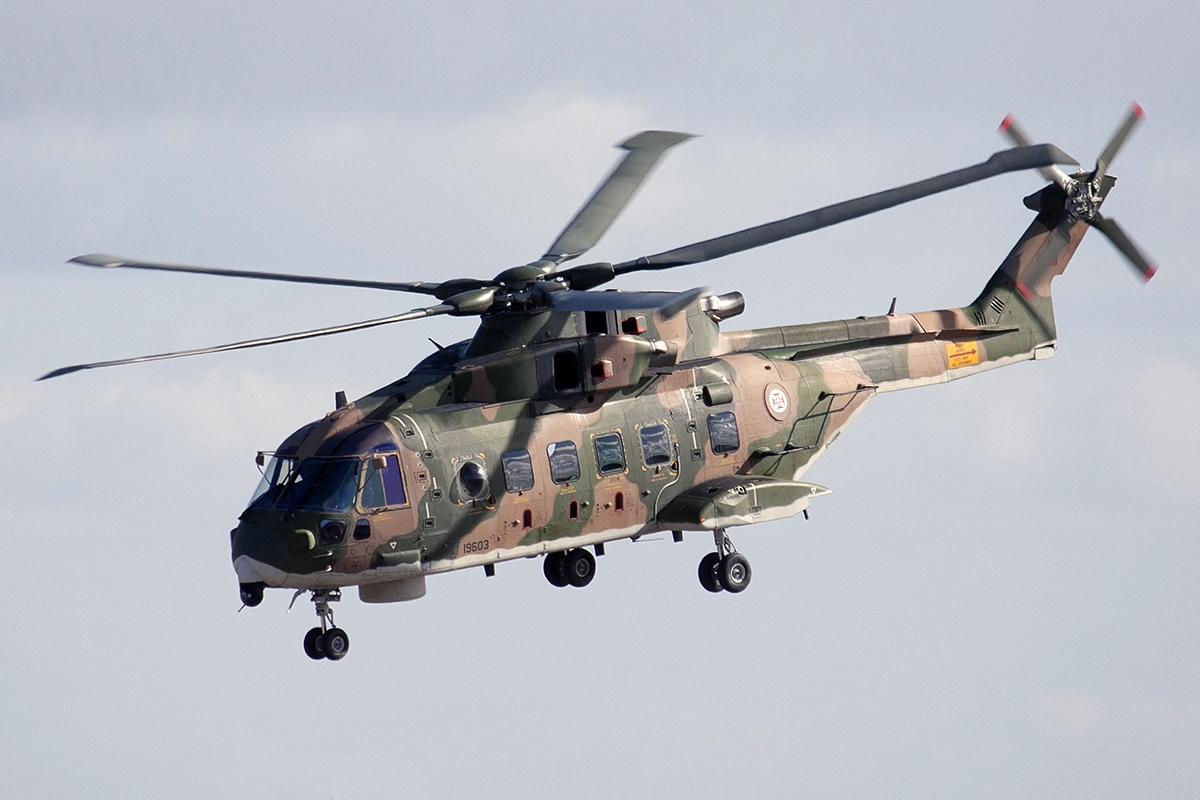
A Portuguese Merlin lifts off from Monte Real Air Base

Algeria

- Algerian Air Force
- Algerian Navy

Canada

- Royal Canadian Air Force (see CH-149 Cormorant)

Denmark

- Royal Danish Air Force

Indonesia

- Indonesian Air Force

Italy

- Italian Air Force

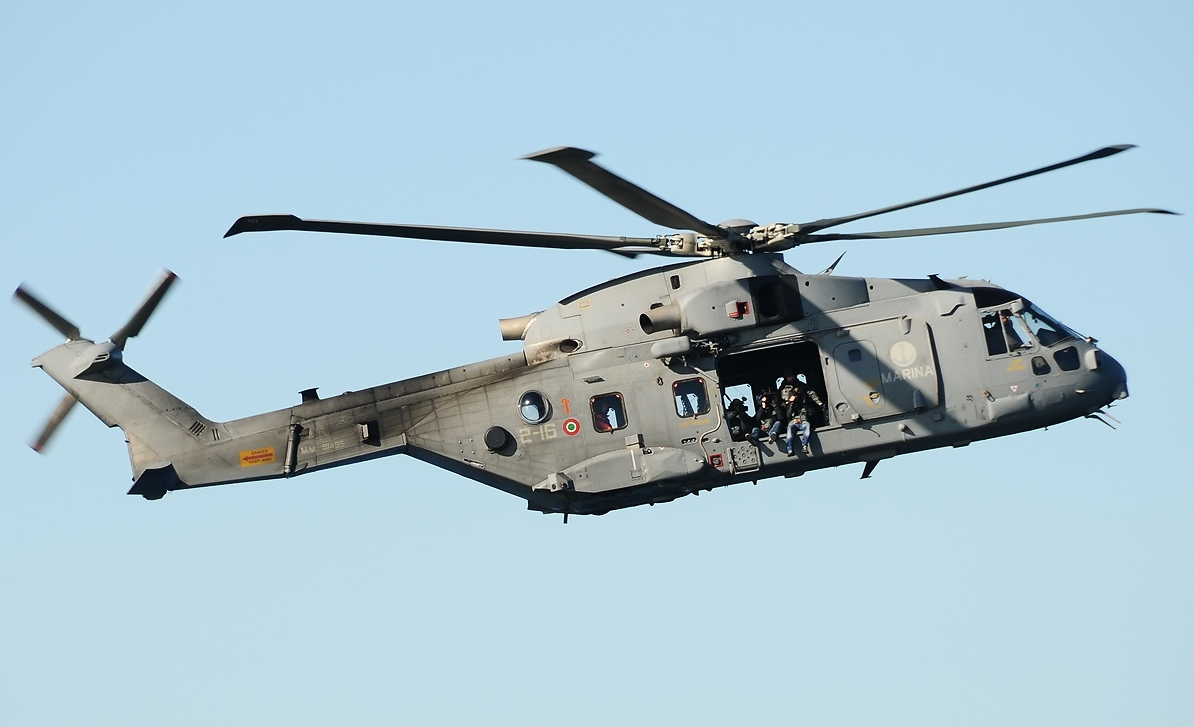
An Italian Navy AW101 flies over the carrier Cavour

- Italian Navy

Japan

- Japan Maritime Self-Defense Force - 10

Nigeria

- Nigerian Air Force

Norway

- Royal Norwegian Air Force

Poland

- Polish Navy (4 delivered)

Portugal

- Portuguese Air Force

Saudi Arabia

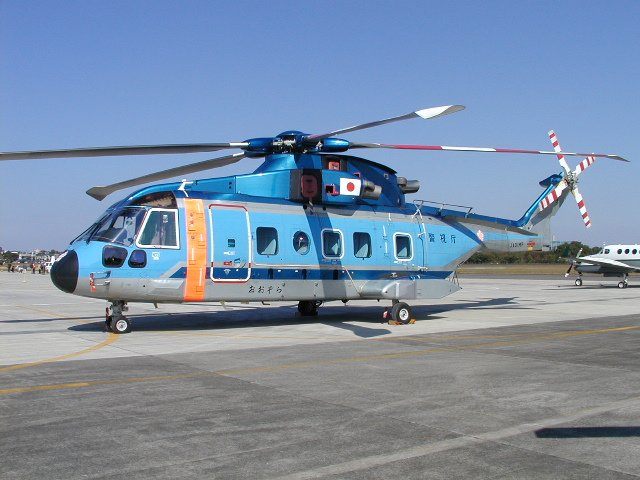
Tokyo Metropolitan Police Department AW101

- Royal Saudi Air Force

Turkmenistan

- Turkmen Air Force

United Kingdom

- Royal Navy

=== Former ===
India

- Indian Air Force

Japan

- Tokyo Metropolitan Police Department

United Kingdom

- Royal Air Force

== Notable accidents ==
On 4 September 2024, a member of Royal Navy personnel died after a Royal Navy Merlin Mk. 4 helicopter ditched in the English Channel near Dorset while conducting night flying exercises with HMS Queen Elizabeth. The two other crew on board were taken to a hospital.

On 3 June 2026, a Royal Navy Merlin Mk. 4 helicopter crashed near Sourton during a training exercise killing three Navy personnel.

== Specifications (Merlin HM1) ==
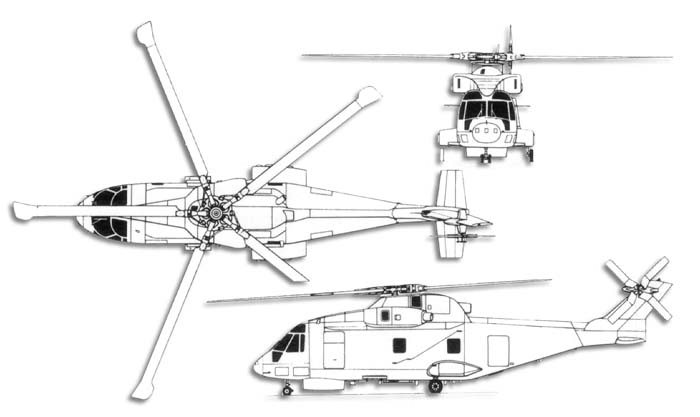
Views of the AW101

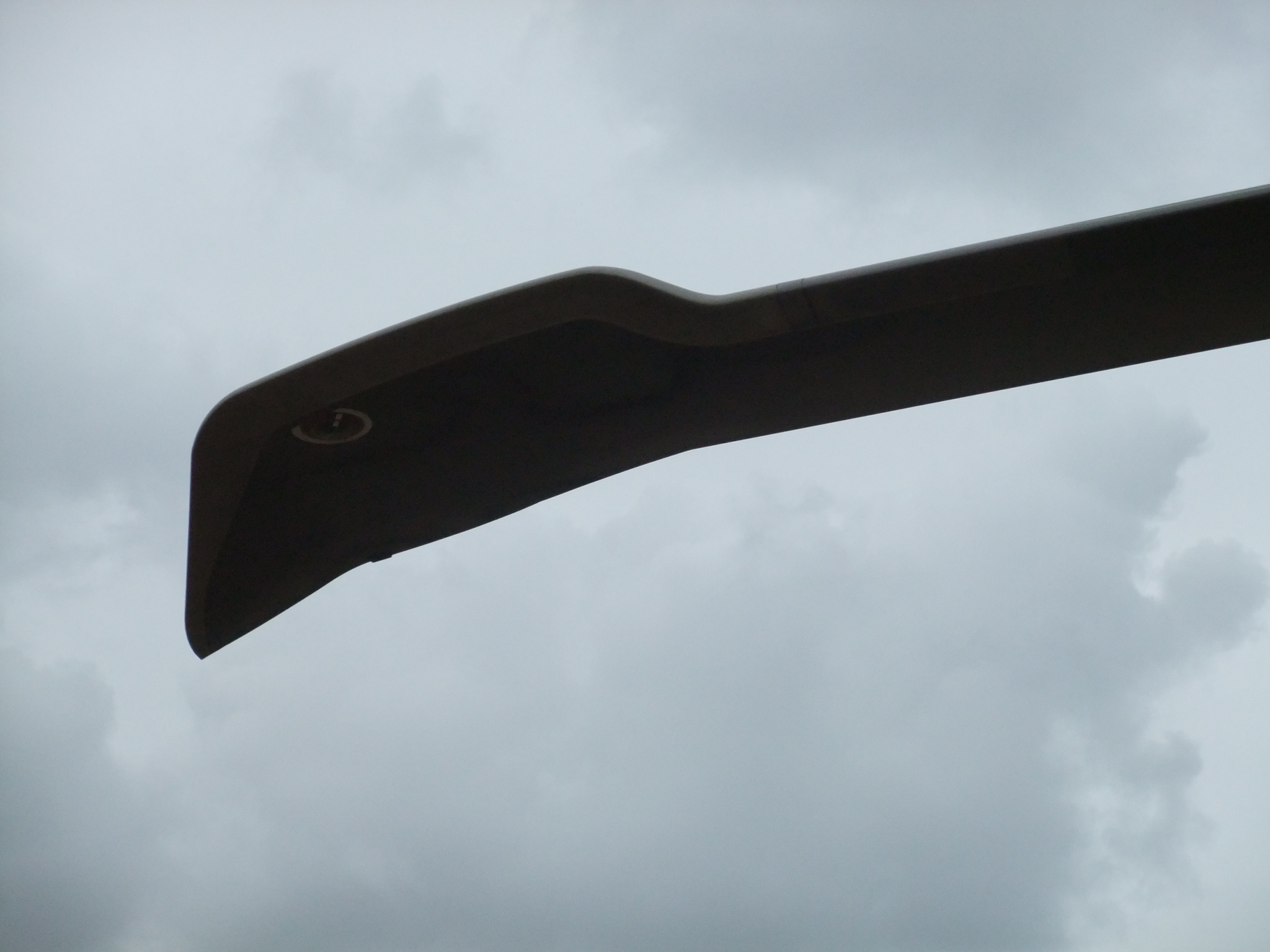
The shovel-shaped BERP rotor blade tips of an RAF Merlin HC3

Data from Jane's All The World's Aircraft 2003–2004, Leonardo 2025

General characteristics

- Crew: 3–4
- Capacity:

- 26 troops (38 passengers) or 5 tonnes of payload or 4 stretchers (with sonar array removed) for Merlin HM1;
- 30 seated troops or 45 standing fully equipped combat troops, or 3,050 kg (6,724 lb) of internal payload, 5,520 kg (12,169 lb) of external payload, or 16 stretchers for AW101

- Length: 19.53 m (64 ft 1 in) fuselage
- Height: 6.62 m (21 ft 9 in)
- Empty weight: 10,500 kg (23,149 lb)
- Max takeoff weight: 15,600 kg (34,392 lb)
- Powerplant: 3 × Rolls-Royce Turbomeca RTM322-01 turboshaft engines, 1,566 kW (2,100 hp) each (take-off power)
- Main rotor diameter: 18.59 m (61 ft 0 in)
- Main rotor area: 271.51 m^{2} (2,922.5 sq ft) root: RAE 9651; tip: RAE 9645/RAE 9634

Performance

- Cruise speed: 278 km/h (173 mph, 150 kn)
- Never exceed speed: 309 km/h (192 mph, 167 kn)
- Range: 1,389 km (863 mi, 750 nmi)
- Endurance: 5 hours
- Service ceiling: 4,575 m (15,010 ft)

Armament

- Bombs: 4× Sting Ray homing torpedoes or Mk 11 depth charges

Avionics

- Smiths Industries OMI 20 SEP dual-redundant digital automatic flight control system
- Navigation systems:
  - BAE Systems LINS 300 ring laser gyro, Litton Italia LISA-4000 strapdown attitude and heading reference system
- Radar:
  - Selex Galileo Blue Kestrel 5000 maritime surveillance radar
- ECM
  - Racal Orange Reaper ESM
- Sonar
  - Thomson Marconi Sonar AQS-903 acoustic processor
  - Active/passive sonobuoys
  - Thomson Sintra FLASH dipping sonar array

== See also ==
- Agusta A.101

Related development

- AgustaWestland CH-149 Cormorant
- Lockheed Martin VH-71 Kestrel

Aircraft of comparable role, configuration, and era

- Changhe Z-18
- Eurocopter EC725
- Mil Mi-17
- Mil Mi-38
- Sikorsky CH-148 Cyclone
- Sikorsky S-92

Related lists

- List of rotorcraft
- List of active United Kingdom military aircraft
