= Hiroshi Yamamura =

Japanese admiral

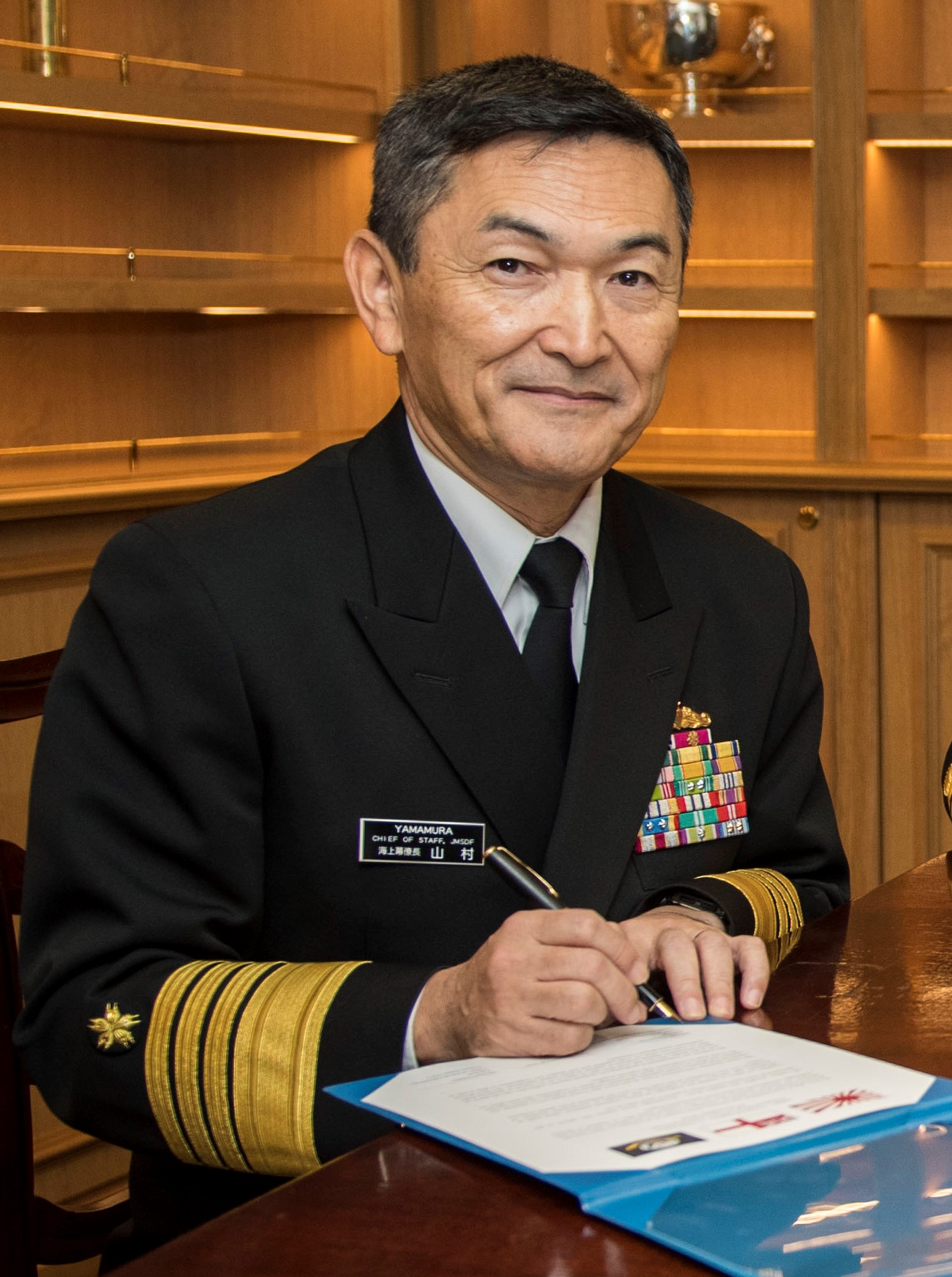

Chief of Staff of the Japanese Maritime Self Defence Force
- In office 20 March 2019 – 30 March 2022
- Preceded by: Adm. Yutaka Murakawa
- Succeeded by: Adm. Ryō Sakai

Personal details
- Born: January 30, 1962 (age 64) Yamaguchi Prefecture, Japan
- Awards: Legion of Merit (Officer)

Military service
- Allegiance: Japan
- Branch/service: Japan Maritime Self-Defense Force
- Years of service: 1984–2022
- Rank: Admiral
- Commands: Chief of Naval Staff; Vice Chief of Staff, Naval Staff Office; Fleet Escort Force; Escort Flotilla 4 Deputy Chief of Staff for Defense Plans and Policy, Joint Staff; Chief of Defense Section, Defense Division, Maritime Staff Division; JS Mineyuki, DD-124

Hiroshi Yamamura (山村 浩, Yamamura Hiroshi; born 30 January 1962) is a retired Japanese naval officer who served as the 34th Chief of Staff of the Japanese Maritime Self Defence Force (JMSDF) from March 2019 to March 2022.

== Career ==
Hiroshi Yamamura graduated from the National Defense Academy of Japan in 1984 and started his career as an electrical engineer. Yamamura served as JMSDF Deputy Chief of Staff since December 2016. His other commands included the Fleet Escort Force, and the Escort Flotilla 4, served as the Deputy Chief of Staff for Defense Plans and Policy, Joint Staff, and as Chief of Defense Section, Defense Division, Maritime Staff Division, and serving as the captain of the JS Mineyuki. In March 2019, he became the 34th and incumbent Chief of Staff of the Japanese Maritime Self-Defense Force (JMSDF).

In April 2019 he visited China for the fleet review of the People's Liberation Army Navy, commemorating the 70th anniversary of the Chinese navy.

== Timeline ==
- March 1984: Graduated from the 28th term (electrical engineering) of the National Defense Academy, joined the Maritime Self-Defense Force
- 1998 (Heisei 10) July: Promoted to 2nd class Kaisa (Lieutenant Colonel)
- August 1999: Chief and Deputy Chief of the escort destroyer "JS Asagiri"
- August 28, 2000: Captain of the escort ship "JS Mineyuki"
- August 10, 2001: Personnel Planning Division, Personnel Education Department, Maritime Staff Office
- January 1, 2003: Promoted to 1st class Kaisa (Colonel)
- August 30, 2004: Chief of the Defense Division, Defense Department, Maritime Staff Office
- August 21, 2006: Personnel Planning Coordinator and Planning Team Leader, Personnel Planning Division, Personnel Education Department, Maritime Staff Office
- July 3, 2007: Chief of Defense Division, Defense Department, Maritime Staff Office

2009 (Heisei 21)

  - July 21: Promoted to Rear Admiral
  - December 7: Commander of the Escort Flotilla 4
- April 27, 2011: Deputy General Manager, General Affairs Department, Maritime Staff Office
- March 30, 2012: Chief of Staff, Fleet Escort Force Command
- August 22, 2013: Director of Defense Planning Department, Joint Staff Office
- August 4, 2015: Promoted to sea general and appointed commander of the 37th Fleet Escort Force
- December 22, 2016: Appointed as the 40th Deputy Chief of the Maritime Staff Office
- April 1, 2019: Appointed as the 34th Chief of Staff, Maritime Self-Defense Force
- 2021 (Reiwa 3) June 1: Received the Legion of Merit from the US Government
- March 30, 2022: Retired

== Awards ==
- Legion of Merit (Officer)
- 防衛省人事発令（2011～2019）

Military offices
Preceded by Yutaka Murakawa	Chief of Staff; Japan Maritime Self-Defense Force; 2019–2022	Succeeded by Ryō Sakai
