= Yutaka Murakawa =

Japanese admiral

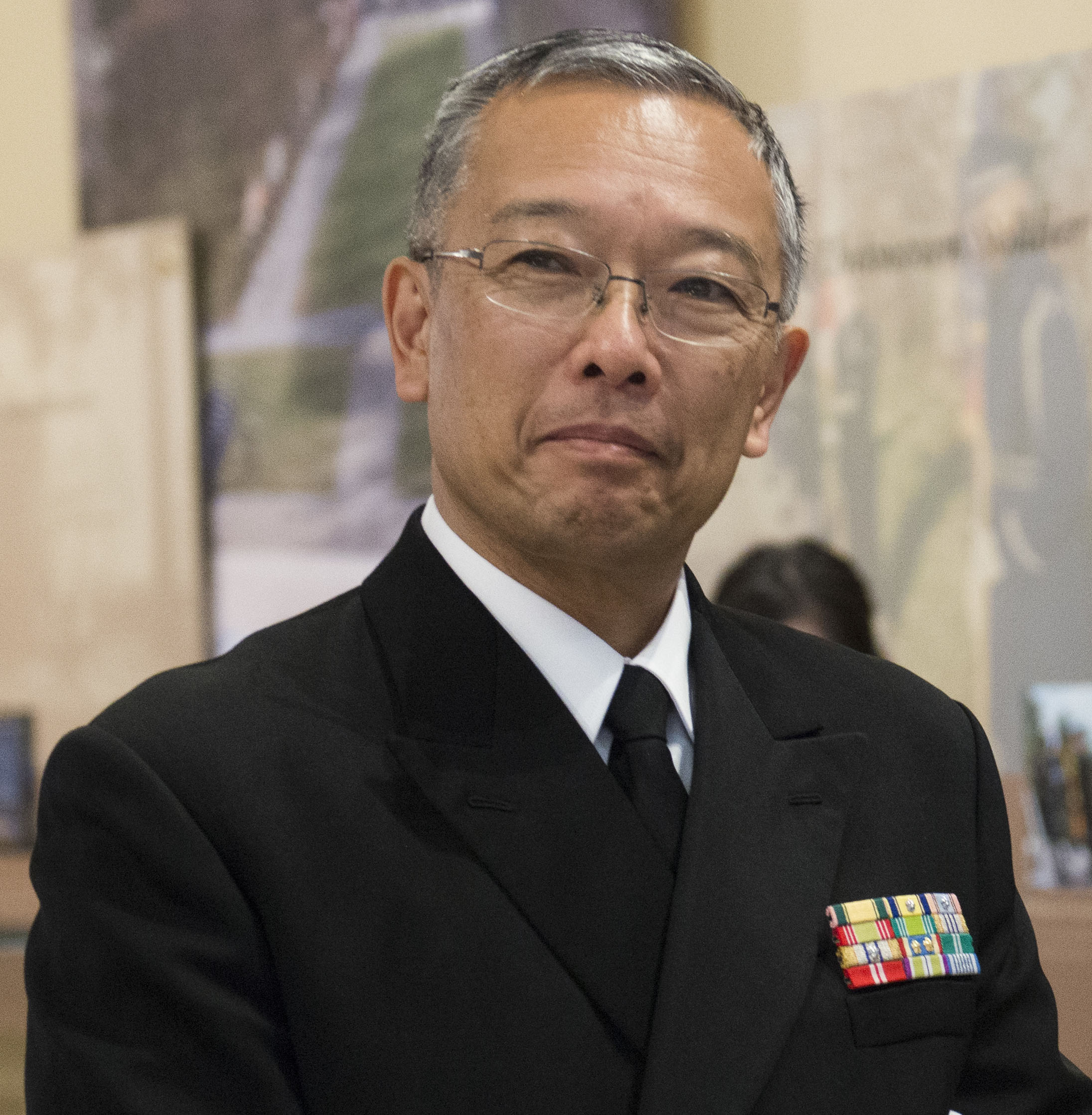

Chief of Staff of the Japanese Maritime Self Defence Force
- In office December 22, 2016 – March 20, 2019
- Preceded by: Adm. Tomohisa Takei
- Succeeded by: Adm. Hiroshi Yamamura

Personal details
- Born: Yutaka Murakawa; January 29, 1958 (age 68) Kawasaki, Kanagawa, Japan
- Awards: Legion of Merit (Officer)

Military service
- Allegiance: Japan
- Branch/service: Japan Maritime Self-Defense Force
- Years of service: 1981–2019
- Rank: Admiral

Admiral Yutaka Murakawa (村川豊, Murakawa Yutaka; born 29 January 1958) is a retired Japanese naval officer who served as the 33rd chief of staff of the Japanese Maritime Self Defence Force (JMSDF) from 2016 to 2019.

Military offices
Preceded by Tomohisa Takei	Chief of Staff; Japan Maritime Self-Defense Force; 2016-2019	Succeeded by Hiroshi Yamamura
