= Tomohisa Takei =

Japanese Admiral

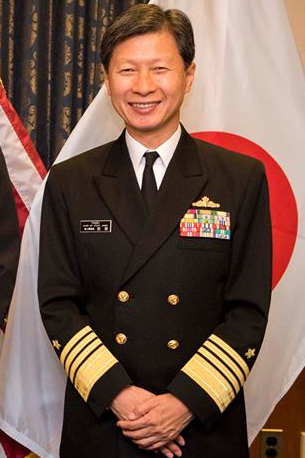
- Born: January 12, 1957 (age 69); Nagano, Japan
- Military career
- Allegiance: Japan
- Branch: Maritime Self-Defense Force
- Service years: 1979 - 2016
- Rank: Admiral
- Awards: Legion of Merit

Tomohisa Takei (武居 智久, Takei Tomohisa; born January 12, 1957) is a retired Japanese admiral who served as the 32nd Chief of Staff, Japan Maritime Self-Defense Force. Born in the Japanese prefecture of Nagano, Takei was commissioned into the JMSDF in March 1979 following his graduation from the 23rd class of National Defense Academy. After 35 years of service, Takei assumed position of JMSDF Chief of Staff in 2014.

== Major assignments ==
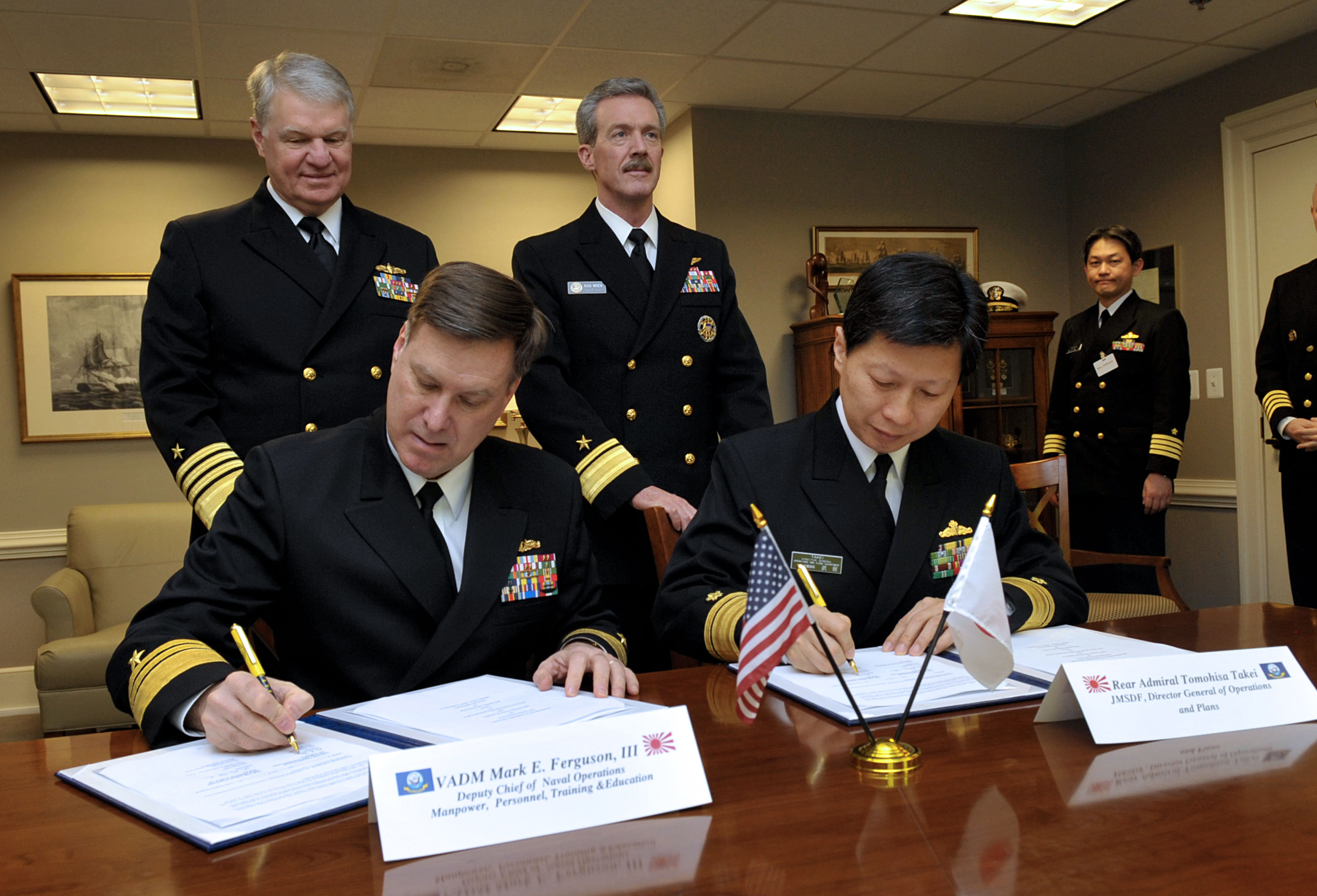
RADM Tomohisa Takei (right) as Director General of Operations and Plans Department, Maritime Staff Office, in 2010.

- March 1997: Commanding Officer, JDS Ishikari (DE-226)
- August 1999: Division staff, Plans and Progrems Division, Operations and Plans Department, Maritime Staff Office
  - December 1999: Section chief, Plans and Progrems Division
- April 2001: Commander, Escort Division 1
- September 2002: Division staff, System Programs Division, Operations and Plans Department, Maritime Staff Office
  - December 2002: Director, System Programs Division
- August 30, 2004: Deputy Director General, Administration Department, Maritime Staff Office
- March 27, 2006: Director General, C4I Systems Department, Joint Staff Office
- September 1, 2007: Chief of Staff, Commandant Kure District
- March 24, 2008: Director General, Operations and Plans Department, Maritime Staff Office
- July 26, 2010: Commandant, Ominato District
- August 5, 2011: Vice Chief of Staff, Japan Maritime Self-Defense Force
- July 26, 2010: Commandant, Yokosuka District
- October 14, 2014: Chief of Staff, Japan Maritime Self-Defense Force

== Awards and honors ==
- – Legion of Merit

== Dates of promotion ==
Promotions
Insignia	Rank	Date
	Ensign	March 1979
	Commander	July 1993
	Captain	January 1998
	Rear Admiral	August 30, 2004
	Vice Admiral	July 26, 2010
	Admiral	October 14, 2014

Military offices
Preceded by Katsutoshi Kawano	Chief of Staff; Japan Maritime Self-Defense Force; 2014-2016	Succeeded by Yutaka Murakawa
