= United States Armed Forces =

Combined military forces of the U.S.

- Emblems of the U.S. Armed Forces service branches
- Founded: 14 June 1775; 251 years ago (Note: With the establishment of the Continental Army.)
- Service branches: U.S. Army; U.S. Marine Corps; U.S. Navy; U.S. Air Force; U.S. Space Force; U.S. Coast Guard
- Headquarters: The Pentagon, Arlington County, Virginia
- Website: war.gov dhs.gov

Leadership
- Commander-in-Chief: President Donald Trump
- Secretary of Defense: Pete Hegseth
- Secretary of Homeland Security: Markwayne Mullin
- Chairman of the Joint Chiefs of Staff: Gen Dan Caine, USAF
- Vice Chairman of the Joint Chiefs of Staff: Gen Christopher J. Mahoney, USMC
- Senior Enlisted Advisor to the Chairman: SEAC David Isom, USN

Personnel
- Military age: 17 with parental consent, 18 for voluntary service. (Note: Maximum age for first-time enlistment is 35 for the Army, 28 for the Marine Corps, 41 for the Navy, 42 for the Air Force, 42 for the Space Force, and 42 for the Coast Guard.)
- Conscription: Inactive since 1973 (males must register at age 18)
- Active personnel: 1,340,655 (ranked 3rd)
- Reserve personnel: 799,500

Expenditure
- Budget: US$901 billion (2026)
- Percent of GDP: 3.22% (2025)

Industry
- Domestic suppliers: List
- Foreign suppliers: United Kingdom; Germany; Netherlands; France; Israel; Italy; Sweden; Australia; India; Japan; Jordan; Spain; Norway; Switzerland; Singapore; South Africa; Czech Republic; Canada; South Korea; Brazil; Bulgaria
- Annual imports: US$652.6 million (2014–2022)
- Annual exports: US$28.50 billion (2014–2022)

Related articles
- History: Military history of the United States; Warfare directory of the United States; Conflicts involving the United States; Battles involving the United States
- Ranks: Commissioned officer; Army officer; Marine Corps officer; Navy officer; Air Force officer; Space Force officer; Coast Guard officer; Warrant officer; Army warrant officer; Marine Corps warrant officer; Navy warrant officer; Air Force warrant officer; Coast Guard warrant officer; Enlisted; Army enlisted; Marine Corps enlisted; Navy enlisted; Air Force enlisted; Space Force enlisted; Coast Guard enlisted

The United States Armed Forces are the military forces of the United States. United States federal law establishes six armed forces: the Army, Marine Corps, Navy, Air Force, Space Force, and Coast Guard, each assigned specific roles and operational domains. With the exception of the Coast Guard, which operates under the Department of Homeland Security (DHS) in peacetime, the services are organized under the Department of Defense (DoD).

Established during the American Revolutionary War, the Army and the Navy, and later the other services, have played a decisive role in the country's history. They contributed to early national consolidation through conflicts such as the Barbary Wars and the War of 1812, shaped the country's territorial evolution, and were involved in global conflicts including World War I, World War II, the Cold War, and the war on terror. The National Security Act of 1947 reorganized the military establishment by creating the DoD, the Air Force, and the National Security Council; in 1949, an amendment to the act merged the cabinet-level departments of the Army, Navy, and Air Force into the DoD. formalizing a unified defense structure under civilian control. The Space Force was established in 2019 as the newest branch.

The president of the U.S. serves as commander-in-chief and exercises authority over the armed forces through the DoD and, for the Coast Guard in peacetime, DHS. Since 1973, the United States has maintained an all-volunteer force, although the Selective Service System remains authorized to conscript most male citizens and residents aged 18 and 25 to register. All six services are also among the eight uniformed services of the United States. (Note: The two uniformed services outside the six armed forces are the United States Public Health Service Commissioned Corps and the National Oceanic and Atmospheric Administration Commissioned Officer Corps. Both services have supported past war efforts for the United States, while they were under militarization orders.) The armed forces consist of active-duty personnel, Reserve components, and the National Guard.

The U.S. Armed Forces are widely considered the world's most powerful and most advanced military. The military expenditure of the U.S. was US$957 billion in 2025, the highest in the world, accounting for 33% of the world's military expenditures. The personnel size of the six armed forces together ranks them among the world's largest state armed forces. The U.S. Armed Forces has significant capabilities in both defense and power projection due to its large budget, resulting in advanced and powerful technologies which enable widespread deployment of the force globally, including around 800 military bases around the world.

== History ==
The history of the U.S. Armed Forces dates back to 14 June 1775, with the creation of the Continental Army, even before the Declaration of Independence marked the establishment of the United States. The Continental Navy, established on 13 October 1775, and Continental Marines, established on 10 November 1775, were created in close succession by the Second Continental Congress in order to defend the new nation against the British Empire in the American Revolutionary War.

These forces demobilized in 1784 after the Treaty of Paris ended the Revolutionary War. The Congress of the Confederation created the current United States Army on 3 June 1784. The United States Congress created the current United States Navy on 27 March 1794 and the current United States Marine Corps on 11 July 1798. All three services trace their origins to their respective Continental predecessors.

The 1787 adoption of the Constitution gave Congress the power to "raise and support armies," to "provide and maintain a navy", and to "make rules for the government and regulation of the land and naval forces", as well as the power to declare war. The president of the United States is the United States Armed Forces' commander-in-chief.

The United States Coast Guard traces its origin to the formation of the Revenue Cutter Service on 4 August 1790, which merged with the United States Life-Saving Service on 28 January 1915 to establish the Coast Guard.

The United States Air Force was established as an independent service on 18 September 1947; it traces its origin to the formation of the Aeronautical Division, U.S. Signal Corps, which was formed 1 August 1907 and was part of the Army Air Forces before being recognized as an independent service in the National Security Act of 1947.

The United States Public Health Service Commissioned Corps was formerly considered to be a branch of the United States Armed Forces from 29 July 1945 until 3 July 1952, and is now one of the eight uniformed services of the United States. Should it be called into active duty again, it would constitute a seventh branch of the Armed Forces.

The United States Space Force was established as an independent service on 20 December 2019. It is the sixth branch of the U.S. military and the first new branch in 72 years. The origin of the Space Force can be traced back to the Air Force Space Command, which was formed 1 September 1982 and was a major command of the United States Air Force.

The U.S. Congressional Research Office annually publishes a List of Notable Deployments of U.S. Military Forces Overseas since 1798.

== Structure ==
Presidential command over the U.S. Armed Forces is established in Article II in the Constitution whereby the president is named as the "Commander in Chief of the Army and Navy of the United States, and of the Militia of the several States, when called into the actual Service of the United States."

The United States Armed Forces are split between two cabinet departments, with the Department of Defense serving as the primary cabinet department for military affairs and the Department of Homeland Security responsible for administering the United States Coast Guard.

The military chain of command flows from the President of the United States to the secretary of defense (for services under the Defense Department) or secretary of homeland security (for services under the Department of Homeland Security), ensuring civilian control of the military.

Within the Department of Defense, the military departments (Department of the Army, Department of the Navy, and Department of the Air Force) are civilian led entities that oversee the coequal military service branches organized within each department. The military departments and services are responsible for organizing, training, and equipping forces, with the actual chain of command flowing through the unified combatant commands.

=== Joint Chiefs of Staff ===
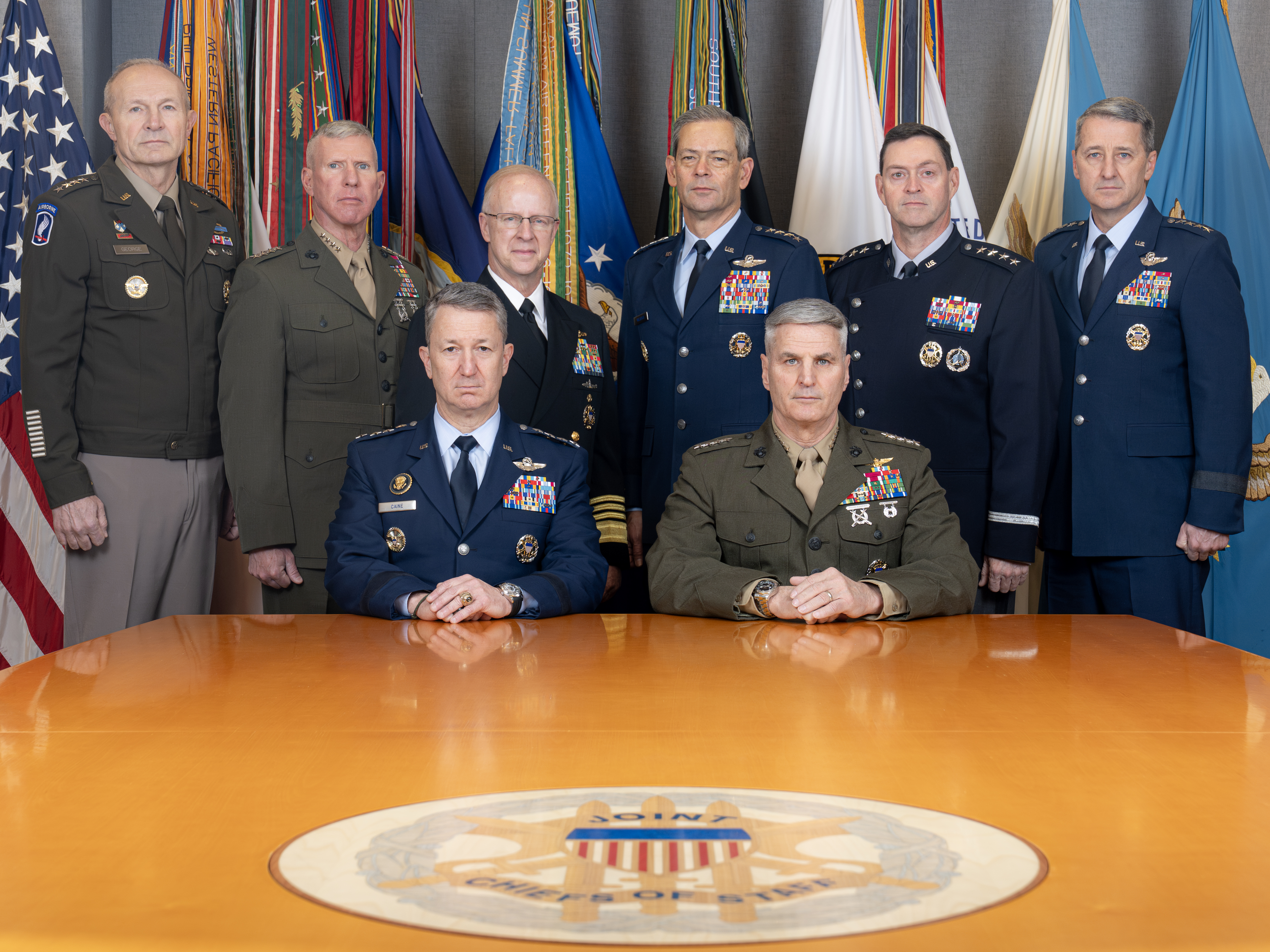
The Joint Chiefs of Staff in January 2026

The Joint Chiefs of Staff, although outside the operational chain of command, is the senior-most military body of the Department of Defense. It is led by the Chairman of the Joint Chiefs of Staff, who is the principal advisor to the president and secretary of defense on military matters. Their deputy is the Vice Chairman of the Joint Chiefs of Staff. Both the Chairman and Vice Chairman are barred from exercising military command over the Joint Chiefs of Staff or any of the armed forces with the exception of the Joint Staff.

Other members include the chief of staff of the Army, commandant of the Marine Corps, chief of naval operations, chief of staff of the Air Force, chief of space operations, and the chief of the National Guard Bureau.

The commandant of the Coast Guard is not an official member of the Joint Chiefs, but sometimes attends meetings as one of the military service chiefs.

The senior enlisted advisor to the chairman is the most senior non-commissioned officer (NCO) in the United States Armed Forces and is a unique enlisted rank which only one individual may hold it. Is the primary enlisted advisor to the chairman, and serves at the pleasure of the secretary of defense.

The president of the United States, the secretary of defense, the secretary of homeland security and chairman of the Joint Chiefs of Staff are members of the United States National Security Council, which advises the president on national security, military, and foreign policy matters.

The national security advisor, the homeland security advisor, and the deputy national security advisor may also be members of the United States Armed Forces.

The National Security Council Deputies Committee also includes the deputy secretary of defense, deputy secretary of homeland security, and vice chairman of the Joint Chiefs of Staff.

Military leadership, including the secretary of defense, the secretary of Homeland Security, and chairman of the Joint Chiefs of Staff also sit on the National Space Council.

=== Unified combatant commands ===
Unified combatant commands are joint military commands consisting of forces from multiple military departments, with their chain of command flowing from the president, to the secretary of defense, to the commanders of the combatant commands.

Each service organizes, trains, and equips forces that are then presented to the unified combatant commands through service component commands. Special Operations Command and Cyber Command also present theater special operations commands or joint force headquarters – cyber to other combatant commanders.

Army components are typically dual-hatted as the joint force land component, Navy components are typically dual-hatted as the joint force maritime component, and Air Force components are typically dual-hatted as the joint force air component, with the theater special operations command dual-hatted as the joint force special operations component, and Space Force component typically dual-hatted as the joint force space component.

Name	Mission	Headquarters	Subunified commands
U.S. Africa Command (USAFRICOM)	Conducts U.S. military operations in Africa.	Kelley Barracks, Germany	
U.S. Central Command (USCENTCOM)	Conducts U.S. military operations in the Middle East and Central Asia.	MacDill Air Force Base, Florida	
U.S. Cyber Command (USCYBERCOM)	Conduct U.S. military cyber operations.	Fort Meade, Maryland	Cyber National Mission Force
U.S. European Command (USEUCOM)	Conducts U.S. military operations in Europe.	Patch Barracks, Germany	
U.S. Northern Command (USNORTHCOM)	Conducts U.S. military operations in North America and homeland defense operations.	Peterson Space Force Base, Colorado	Alaskan Command
U.S. Pacific Command (USPACOM)	Conducts U.S. military operations in the Indo-Pacific.	Camp H. M. Smith, Hawaii	U.S. Forces Japan; U.S. Forces Korea
U.S. Southern Command (USSOUTHCOM)	Conducts U.S. military operations in Central America, South America, and the Caribbean.	Doral, Florida	
U.S. Space Command (USSPACECOM)	Conducts U.S. military operations in outer space.	Peterson Space Force Base, Colorado	
U.S. Special Operations Command (USSOCOM)	Develops and employs special operations forces.	MacDill Air Force Base, Florida	Joint Special Operations Command; Special Operations Command Africa; Special Operations Command Central; Special Operations Command Europe; Special Operations Command Korea; Special Operations Command North; Special Operations Command Pacific; Special Operations Command South
U.S. Strategic Command (USSTRATCOM)	Conduct strategic deterrence, nuclear operations, nuclear command, control, and communications, joint electromagnetic spectrum operations, and global strike.	Offutt Air Force Base, Nebraska	
U.S. Transportation Command (USTRANSCOM)	Conduct globally integrated mobility operations.	Scott Air Force Base, Illinois	

=== Combat support agencies ===
Combat support agencies are Department of Defense agencies with combat support missions that service operating forces planning or conducting military operations. This includes support during conflict or in the conduct of other military activities related to countering threats to U.S. national security. This mission is focused on providing support to echelons at the CCMD level and below and may not encompass the full scope of the CSA's mission.

Name	Mission	Headquarters
Defense Contract Management Agency (DCMA)	Provide contract administration services for the Department of Defense.	Fort Gregg-Adams, Virginia
Defense Health Agency (DHA)	Provide and augment medical capabilities for combatant commands.	Falls Church, Virginia
Defense Information Systems Agency (DISA)	Provide, operate and assure command, control, information-sharing capabilities.	Fort Meade, Maryland
Defense Intelligence Agency (DIA)	Provide military intelligence to warfighters, defense policymakers and force planners in the Department of Defense and Intelligence Community, in support of U.S. military planning and operations and weapon systems acquisition.	Defense Intelligence Agency Headquarters, Joint Base Anacostia–Bolling, Washington D.C.
Defense Logistics Agency (DLA)	Manages the end-to-end global defense supply chain.	Fort Belvoir, Virginia
Defense Threat Reduction Agency (DTRA)	Identify, develop, and field solutions to counter weapons of mass destruction and emerging threats.	Fort Belvoir, Virginia
National Geospatial-Intelligence Agency (NGA)	Delivers geospatial intelligence to policymakers, military service members, intelligence professionals and first responders.	Fort Belvoir, Virginia
National Security Agency / Central Security Service (NSA/CSS)	Provides timely and accurate cryptologic support, knowledge, and assistance to the military cryptologic community. Provide actionable signals intelligence and cybersecurity support to the Armed Forces.	Fort Meade, Maryland

== Service branches ==
The United States Armed Forces is composed of six coequal military service branches. Five of the branches, the United States Army, United States Marine Corps, United States Navy, United States Air Force, and United States Space Force, are part of the Department of Defense.

The United States Coast Guard is normally under the Department of Homeland Security, but may be transferred to the Department of Defense's Department of the Navy (which is the civilian entity that oversees the coequal U.S. Marine Corps and U.S. Navy) at the direction of the President or Congress.

With the exception of the Coast Guard, the military services only organize, train, and equip forces. The unified combatant commands are responsible for operational control of non-service retained forces.

Each of the different military services is assigned a role and domain. The U.S. Army conducts land operations, while the U.S. Navy and U.S. Marine Corps conduct maritime operations, with the Marine Corps specializing in amphibious and maritime littoral operations in support of the Navy. The U.S. Air Force conducts air operations, while the U.S. Space Force conducts space operations.

The U.S. Coast Guard is unique in that it is a military branch specializing in maritime operations and also a law enforcement agency.

=== U.S. Army ===
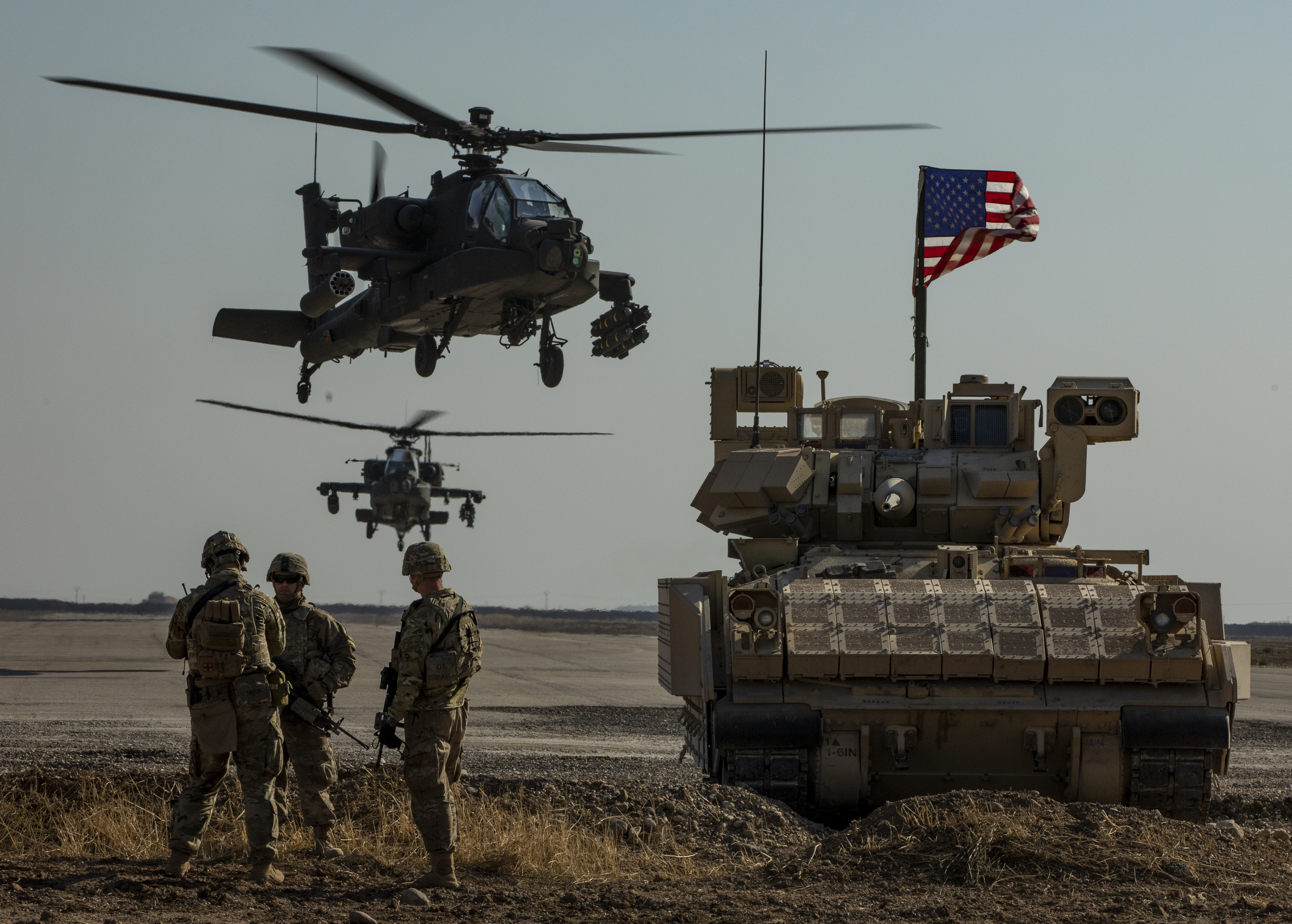
1st Armored Division infantry, an M2 Bradley armored vehicle, and AH-64 Apache attack helicopters as part of Combined Joint Task Force – Operation Inherent Resolve in Syria

The United States Army (USA) is the United States Armed Forces' land force and is the largest and oldest service. Originally established in 1775 as the Continental Army, it consists of one million soldiers across the Regular Army, Army Reserve, and Army National Guard. The Army serves as the Armed Forces principal land service, responsible for conducting land warfare operations.

The U.S. Army is organized under the Department of the Army, which is a military department under the leadership of the secretary of the Army and under secretary of the Army.

The U.S. Army itself is led by the chief of staff of the Army and vice chief of staff of the Army, both generals who are advised by the sergeant major of the Army.

The Army's primary responsibility is to conduct prompt and sustained land combat as part of the joint force. Army landpower focuses on destroying an enemy's armed forces, occupying its territory, and breaking the will of an adversary.

The five core competencies of the Army are:

- Prompt and sustained land combat
- Combined arms operations:
  - Combined arms maneuver and wide area security
  - Armored and mechanized operations
  - Airborne and air assault operations
- Special operations
- Set and sustain the theater for the joint force
- Integrate national, multinational, and joint power on land

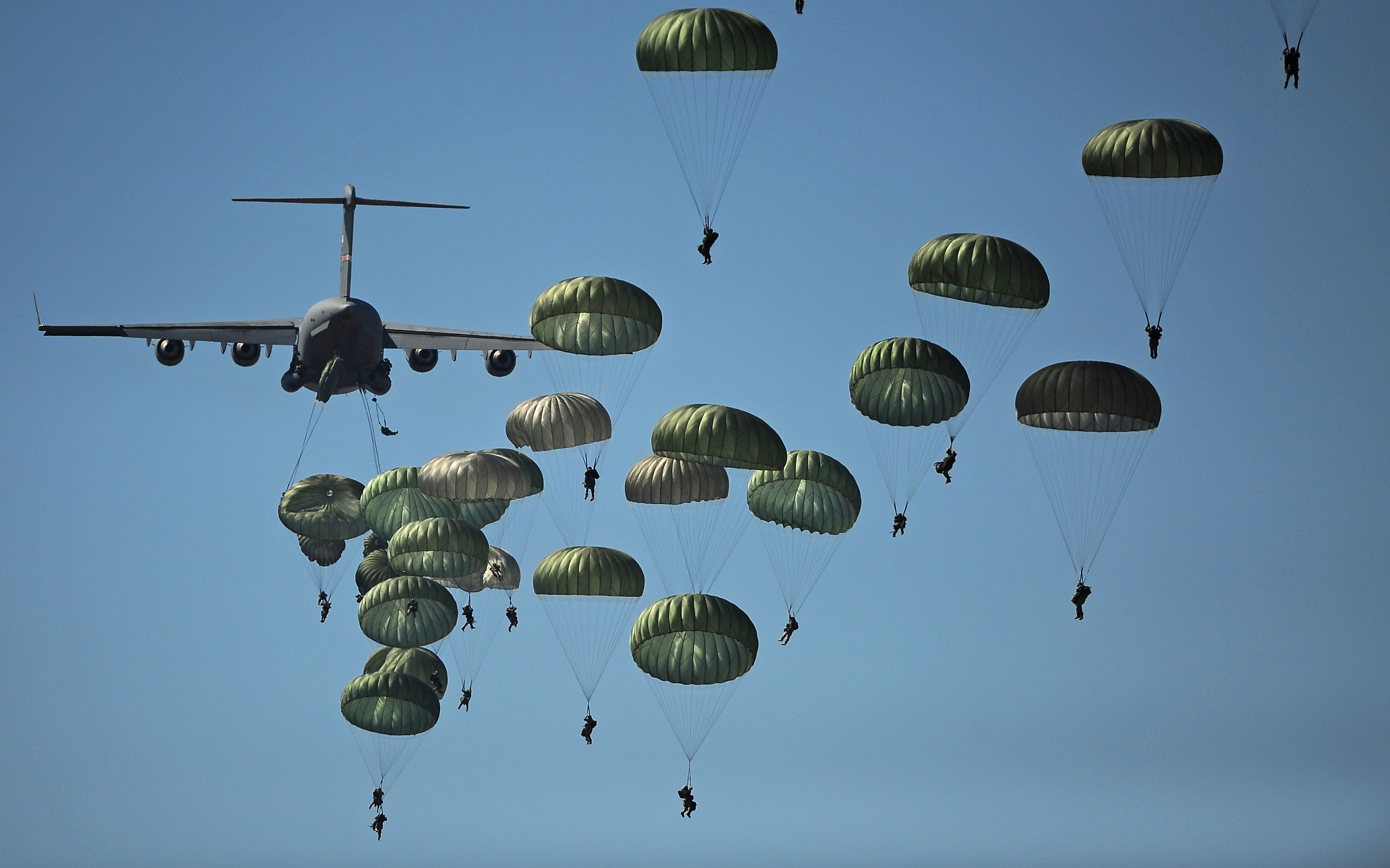
82nd Airborne Division paratroopers parachuting from a U.S. Air Force C-17 Globemaster III transport plane

The thirteen specified functions of the Army are:

1. Conduct prompt and sustained combined arms combat operations on land in all environments and types of terrain, to include complex urban environments, in order to defeat enemy ground forces, and seize, occupy, and defend land areas.
2. Conduct air and missile defense to support joint campaigns and assist in achieving air superiority. This is conducted by the Army's Air Defense Artillery Branch, specifically by the 10th Army Air and Missile Defense Command, 32nd Army Air and Missile Defense Command, 94th Army Air and Missile Defense Command, 263rd Army Air and Missile Defense Command, and Army Space and Missile Defense Command.
3. Conduct airborne and air assault, and amphibious operations. The Army has primary responsibility for the development of airborne doctrine, tactics, techniques, and procedures. Army airborne and air assault operations are conducted by the XVIII Airborne Corps, 11th Airborne Division, 82nd Airborne Division, 101st Airborne Division, and the 173rd Airborne Brigade.
4. Conduct civil affairs operations. Civil affairs operations are conducted by the United States Army Special Operations Command, predominantly under United States Army Civil Affairs and Psychological Operations Command and the 95th Civil Affairs Brigade.
5. Conduct riverine operations.
6. Occupy territories abroad and provide for the initial establishment of a military government pending transfer of this responsibility to other authorities.
7. Interdict enemy sea power, space power, air power, and communications through operations on and from the land.
8. Provide logistics to joint operations and campaigns, including joint over-the-shore and intra-theater transport of time-sensitive, mission-critical personnel and materiel. This is primarily conducted through the Army Logistics Branch, including the Quartermaster Corps, Ordnance Corps, Transportation Corps, and through Army Materiel Command's Military Surface Deployment and Distribution Command.
9. Provide support to space operations to enhance joint campaigns, in coordination with the other military services (primarily the United States Space Force), combatant commands (primarily United States Space Command), and other U.S. government departments and agencies. Army space operations are conducted by Army Space and Missile Defense Command.
10. Conduct authorized civil works programs, to include projects for the improvement of navigation, flood control, beach erosion control, and other water resource developments in the United States, its territories, and its possessions, and conduct other civil activities prescribed by law. These are conducted by the Army Corps of Engineers.
11. Provide intra-theater aeromedical evacuation. These missions are flown by the Army Medical Service Corps and Army Aviation Branch.
12. Conduct reconnaissance, surveillance, and target acquisition.
13. Operate land lines of communication. This is primarily conducted through the Transportation Corps and Military Surface Deployment and Distribution Command.

==== Infantry ====
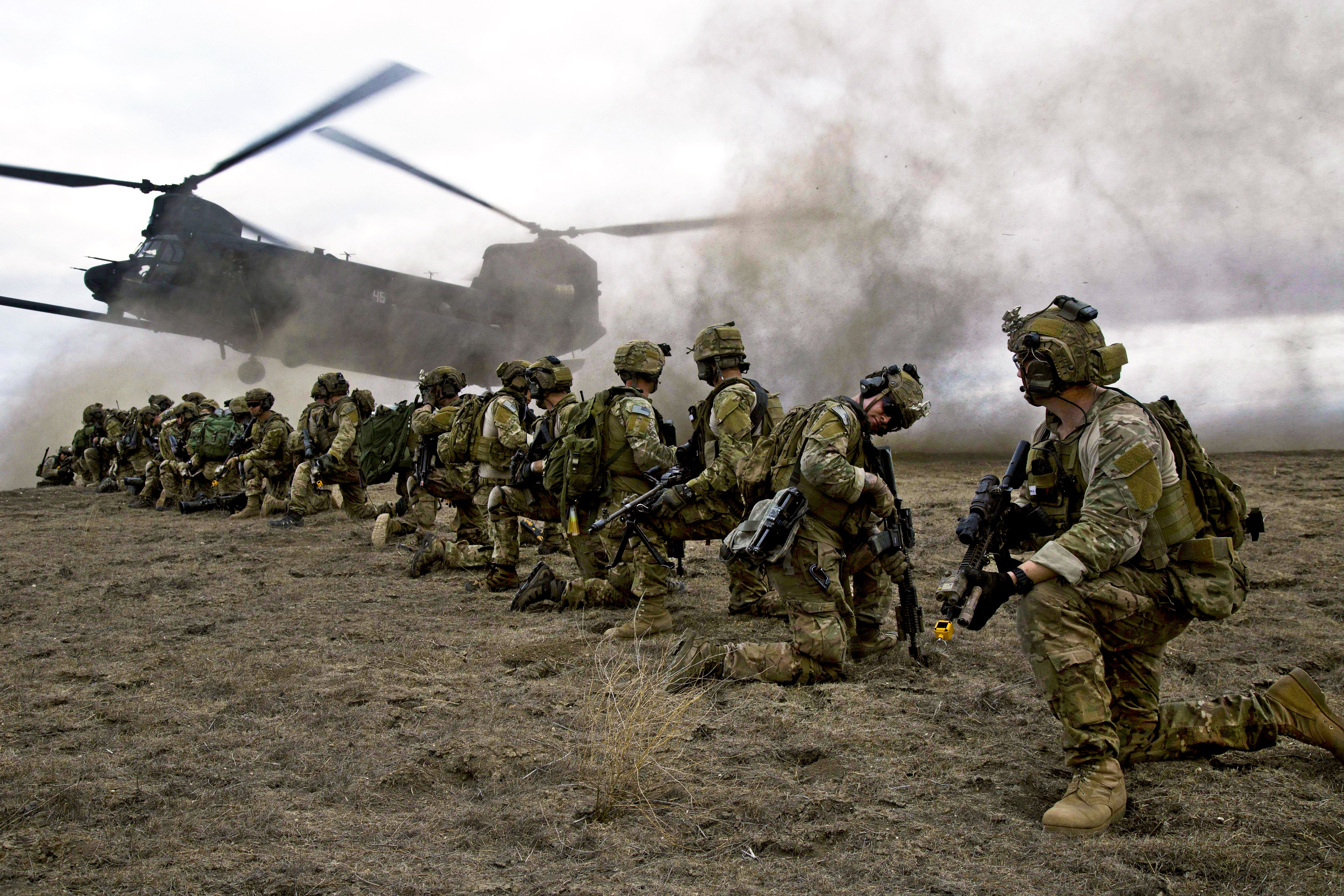
U.S. Army Rangers with the 75th Ranger Regiment prepare for extraction on a MH-47 Chinook

The Infantry Branch forms the core of the service's land combat power. U.S. Army infantry are generally equipped with the M4 carbine and M249 light machine gun, which will be replaced by the XM7 rifle and XM250.

Infantry is a core part of the Army's Brigade Combat Teams. The most numerous variant, the Infantry Brigade Combat Team, comprises light infantry battalions who fight on foot.

Infantry Brigade Combat Teams of the 82nd Airborne Division are air assault capable, with infantry soldiers being transported by U.S. Army Aviation UH-60 Black Hawk and CH-47 Chinook helicopters.

Infantry Brigade Combat Teams of the 11th Airborne Division, 82nd Airborne Division, and 173rd Airborne Brigade are capable of airborne operations, in cooperation with the U.S. Air Force's transport aircraft.

Finally, Infantry Brigade Combat Teams assigned to the 10th Mountain Division specialize in mountain warfare. Standard Infantry Brigade Combat Teams are assigned to the 25th Infantry Division, which offers additional training in jungle warfare.

Armored Brigade Combat Teams comprise mechanized infantry battalions mounted in the M2 Bradley infantry fighting vehicle.Divisions with Armored Brigade Combat Teams include the 1st Infantry Division, 3rd Infantry Division, 4th Infantry Division, 1st Armored Division, and 1st Cavalry Division.

Stryker Brigade Combat Teams are centered around Stryker infantry battalions operating out of the Stryker.Divisions with Stryker Brigade Combat Teams include the 2nd Infantry Division, 4th Infantry Division, 11th Airborne Division, 2nd Cavalry Regiment, and 3rd Cavalry Regiment.

United States Army Rangers with the 75th Ranger Regiment are an elite special operations infantry force in the United States Army Special Operations Command, specializing in air assault and airborne infiltration methods. The three primary missions of the 75th Ranger Regiment are special operations raids, forcible entry operations, such as an airfield seizure to enable the Air Force to bring in more forces, and special reconnaissance. As a special operations force, Army Rangers are generally better equipped than standard infantry, utilizing the FN SCAR rifle.

==== Army Special Forces ====
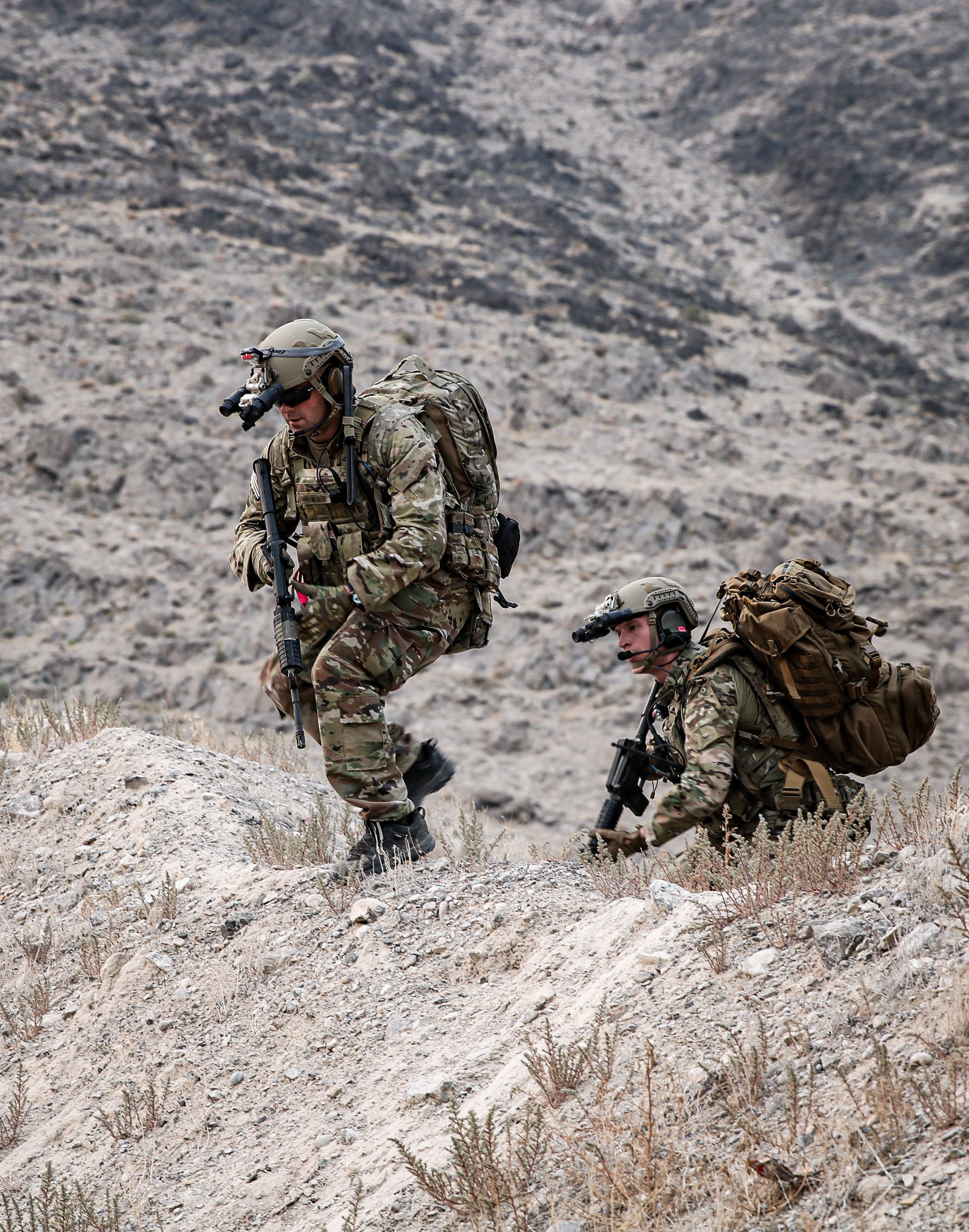
Soldiers from the 5th Special Forces Group conduct sensitive site exploitation training

Army Special Forces, commonly known as Green Berets after their iconic headgear, are among the most elite soldiers in the Army. Special Forces conduct:

- counterinsurgency distinguishing between civilians and enemy combatants while assisting with the stabilization, defense, and training of developing countries facing insurgent threats.
- direct action seizing, capturing, recovering, or destroying enemy material; or utilizing quick strikes to recover personnel.
- foreign internal defense training and equipping foreign allied military forces to defend against insurgency, subversion, terrorism, and other security threats.
- special reconnaissance executing surveillance in hostile, denied, or diplomatically or politically sensitive environments to collect or verify information of strategic significance.
- unconventional warfare enabling a resistance movement or insurgency to coerce, disrupt, or overthrow a government or occupying power by operating through or with an underground force in a denied area.

Army Special Forces are trained in military free-fall parachuting and combat diver skillsets. They are considered the most versatile special operations force in the entire world, operating as a multi-purpose force since 1952.

==== Armor and Cavalry ====
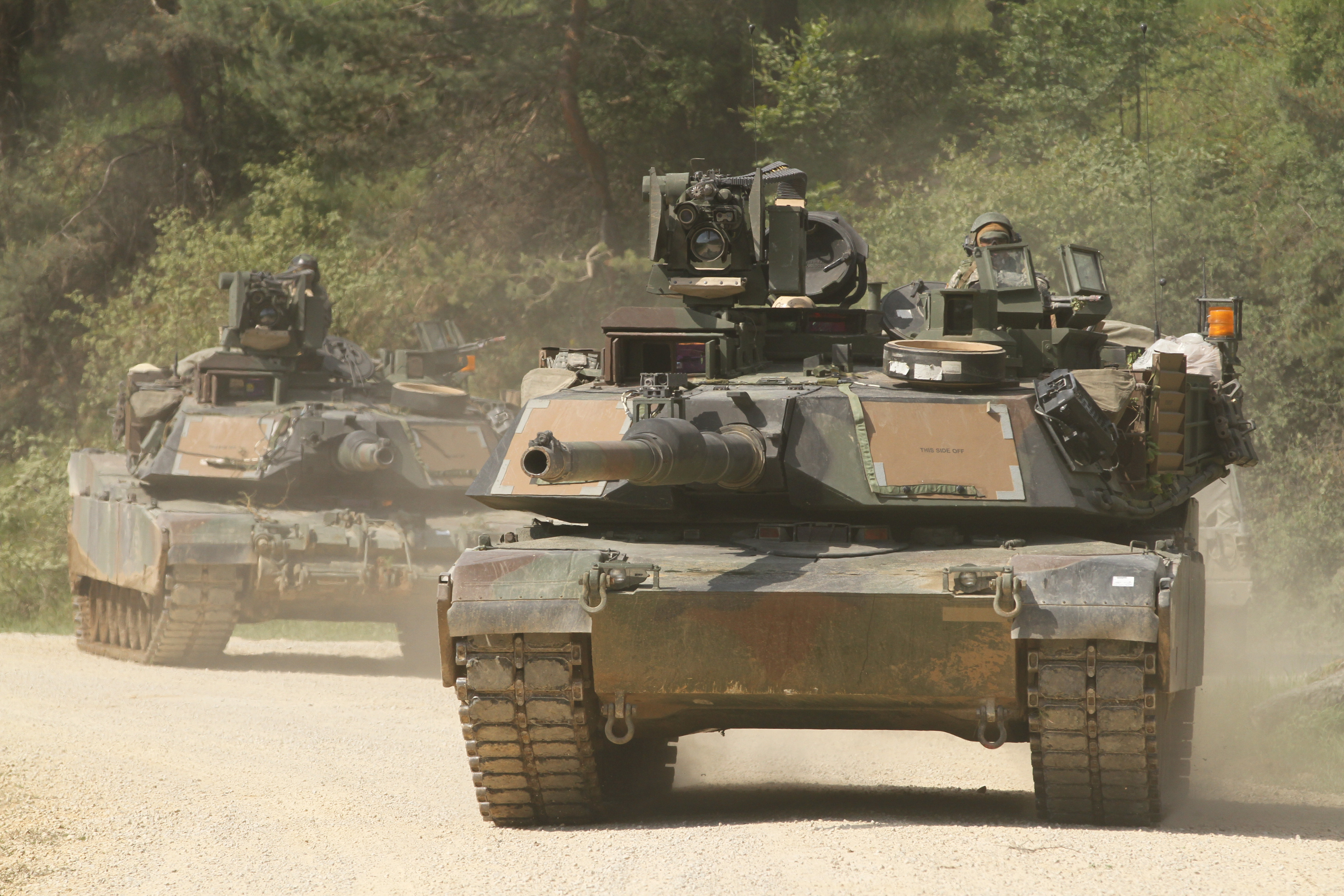
1st Cavalry Division M1 Abrams tanks during a training exercise in Germany

The Armor Branch traces its history back to the United States Cavalry and are responsible for tank and cavalry reconnaissance operations.

The U.S. Army fields the M1 Abrams main battle tank in Armored Battalions as part of Armored Brigade Combat Teams across the 1st Armored Division, 1st Cavalry Division, 1st Infantry Division, 3rd Infantry Division, and the 4th Infantry Division.Each Armored Brigade Combat Team also possesses a cavalry squadron equipped with M2 Bradleys for scouting and security.

Stryker Brigade Combat Teams from the 2nd Infantry Division, 4th Infantry Division, 11th Airborne Division, 2nd Cavalry Regiment, and 3rd Cavalry Regiment have a cavalry squadron equipped with Strykers.

Infantry Brigade Combat Teams from the 10th Mountain Division, 11th Airborne Division, 25th Infantry Division, 82nd Airborne Division, 101st Airborne Division, and 173rd Airborne Brigade have a cavalry squadron equipped with the Joint Light Tactical Vehicle.

==== Field Artillery ====
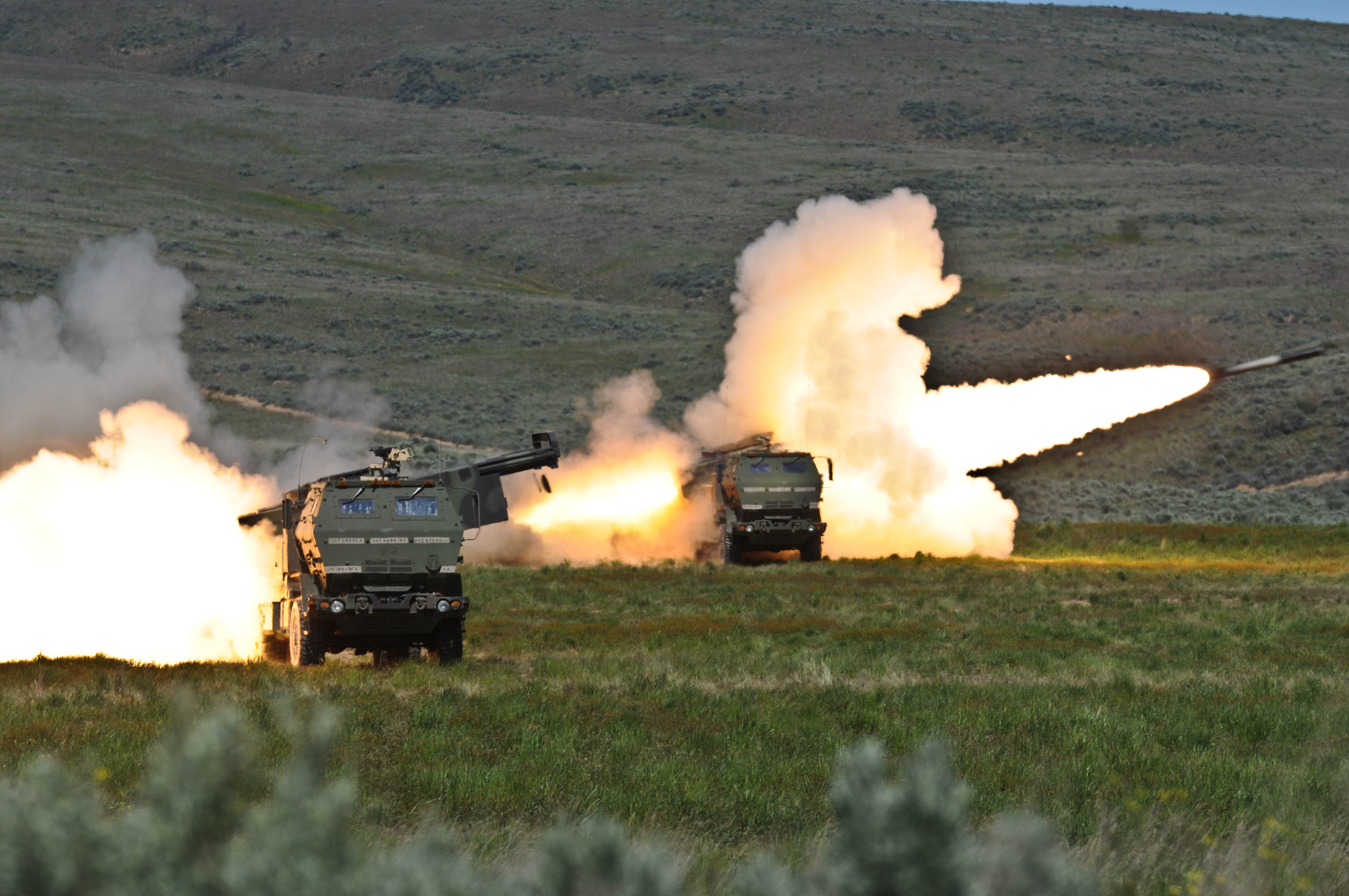
M142 HIMARS from the 5th Battalion, 3rd Field Artillery Regiment

The Field Artillery's mission is to destroy, suppress or neutralize the enemy by cannon, rocket or missile fire.

Rocket systems include the M142 HIMARS and M270 multiple launch rocket system, which are corps-level assets found in field artillery brigades.

Towed artillery includes the M119 howitzer in infantry brigade combat teams and the M777 howitzer found in both infantry and Stryker brigade combat teams.

The M109 self-propelled howitzer is utilized in armored brigade combat teams.

During the Cold War, Army field artillery was responsible for the service's ballistic missile programs, including the PGM-11 Redstone, which was the first large ballistic missile in the U.S. arsenal, the MGM-31 Pershing, and the Pershing II.

In 2023, the Army is intending to field the Long-Range Hypersonic Weapon and has reestablished larger artillery formations like the 56th Artillery Command.

==== Air Defense Artillery ====
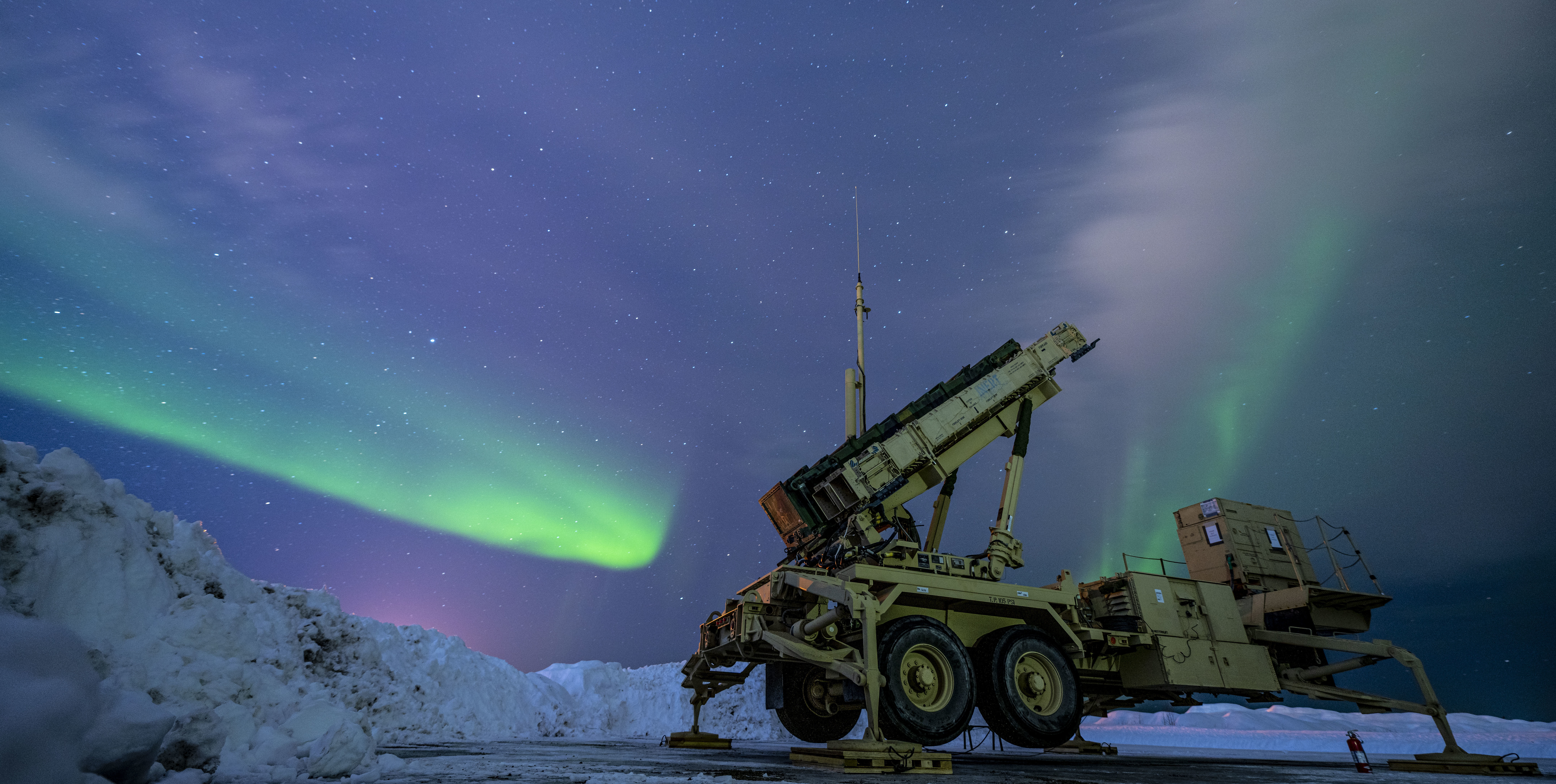
An MIM-104 Patriot missile battery in Alaska operated by the 11th Air Defense Artillery Brigade

The Air Defense Artillery is responsible for defending geopolitical assets and providing maneuver forces with the freedom to move on the battlefield by deterring the enemy and destroying aerial threats, missile attacks, and surveillance platforms.

Weapons employed by Air Defense Artillery include the FIM-92 Stinger man-portable air-defense system, AN/TWQ-1 Avenger for short range air defense, and the counter rocket, artillery, and mortar 20mm gun system.

The Iron Dome provides air defense against rockets, artillery, mortars, missiles, and unmanned aerial vehicles. The MIM-104 Patriot is capable of defeating a wide range of threats including aircraft, helicopters, UAVs, ballistic and cruise missiles, and Weapons of Mass Destruction.

The Terminal High Altitude Area Defense protects strategic critical assets by conducting long-range endo-and-exo-atmospheric engagements of ballistic missiles using the world's largest air-transportable X-band radar.

The Ground-Based Midcourse Defense is an anti-ballistic missile system operated by Army Space and Missile Defense Command to defend the United States homeland against an intercontinental ballistic missile attack.

Major Air Defense Artillery units include the 32nd Army Air and Missile Defense Command and Army Space and Missile Defense Command's 100th Missile Defense Brigade.

Air Defense Artillery has an extremely close relationship with the Air Force through its Air and Missile Defense Commands and the Space Force through Army Space and Missile Defense Command, given their shared missile defense and space roles.

In 1962, Air Defense Artillery achieved the first intercept of a ballistic missile with a nuclear-tipped Nike Zeus and operated the Nike Zeus as an anti-satellite weapon after completing a successful intercept in 1963.

==== Army Aviation ====
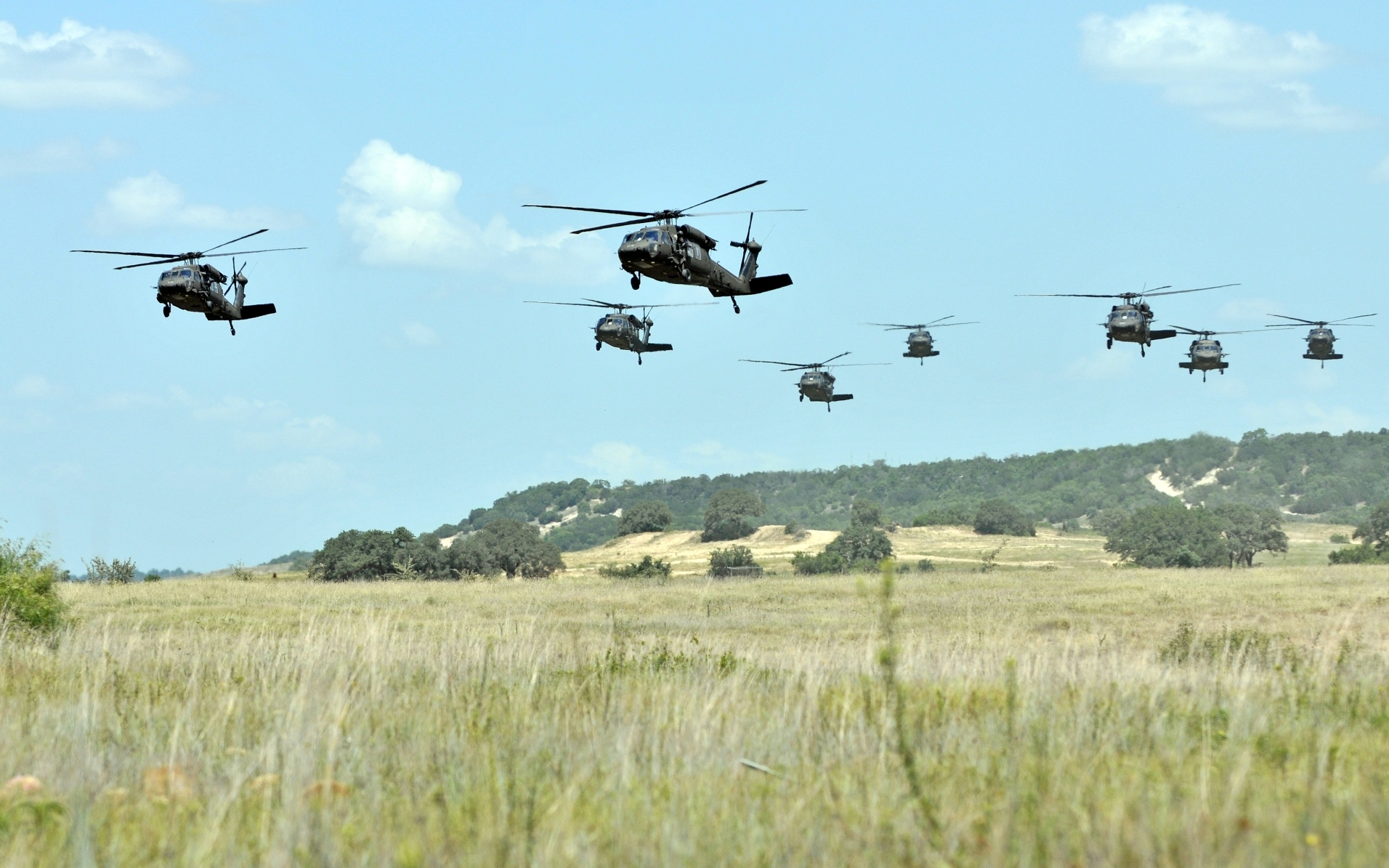
Formation of UH-60 Blackhawks with the 1st Cavalry Division

Army Aviation, distinct from the U.S. Air Force and its predecessors, began as part of the field artillery in 1942. Small spotter planes were used to spot for artillery and naval bombardment, as well as to perform observation.

These few aircraft formed the core of Army Aviation once the U.S. Air Force gained independence. In 1983, the Army created the Aviation Branch, for the first time since the Air Force's independence consolidating aviation under a single organization.

The mission of Army Aviation is to find, fix and destroy any enemy through fire and maneuver and to provide combat support and combat service support in coordinated operations as an integral member of the combined arms team.

Major aircraft include the AH-64 Apache, which serves as the Army's attack helicopter, the UH-60 Black Hawk, and the CH-47 Chinook for troop and cargo transport. Army Aviation also flies the MQ-1C Gray Eagle drone.

A specialized unit within Army Aviation, the 160th Special Operations Aviation Regiment (Airborne) serves as a special operations unit and operates modified variants of the MH-60 Black Hawk, MH-47 Chinook, and the MH-6 Little Bird.

==== Army commands ====
The U.S. Army is organized into four major Army Commands, nine Army Service Component Commands which serve as the Army component and joint force land component commanders for the unified combatant commands, and thirteen direct reporting units.

Name	Mission	Headquarters
Headquarters Department of the Army (HQDA)	Army service headquarters led by the chief of staff of the Army.	The Pentagon, Virginia
Army Commands and reserve components
U.S. Army Forces Command (FORSCOM)	Provides Army land forces to unified combatant commands.	Fort Bragg, North Carolina
U.S. Army Materiel Command (AMC)	Provides technology, acquisition support, and logistics for Army land forces.	Redstone Arsenal, Alabama
U.S. Army Training and Doctrine Command (TRADOC)	Recruits, trains, and educates Army soldiers and develops Army doctrine.	Fort Eustis, Virginia
U.S. Army Futures Command (AFC)	Leads Army modernization efforts, including developing future force requirements, designing future force organizations, and delivering materiel capabilities.	Austin, Texas
U.S. Army Reserve (USAR)	Oversees and maintains Army reserve forces.	Fort Bragg, North Carolina
Army National Guard (ARNG)	Army component of the National Guard.	The Pentagon, Virginia

=== U.S. Marine Corps ===
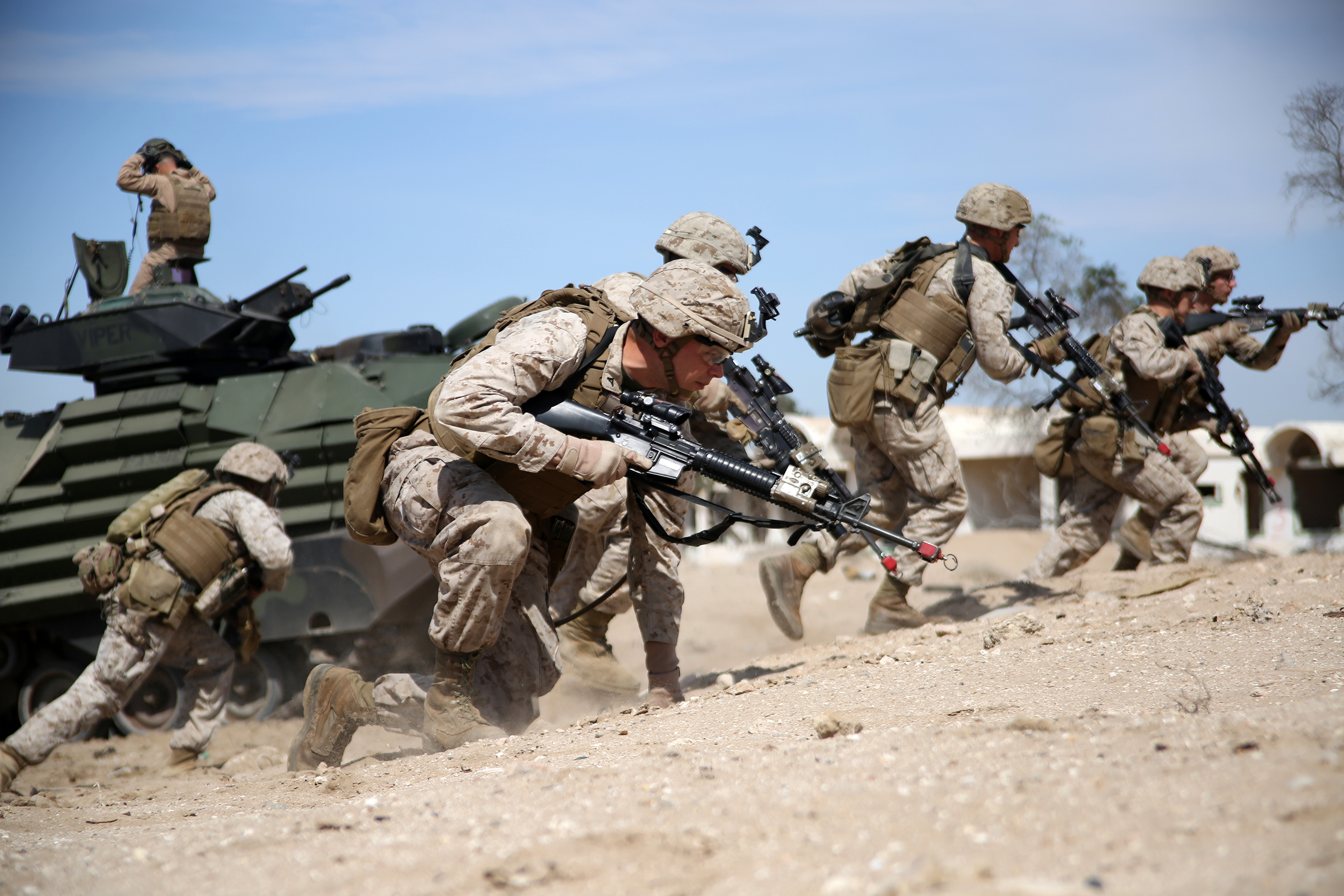
24th Marine Expeditionary Unit Marines during a simulated amphibious assault operation

The United States Marine Corps (USMC) serves as the U.S. Armed Forces' naval land force, responsible for executing amphibious warfare and operating in the maritime littorals in support of the U.S. Navy. Originally established in 1775 as the Continental Marines, the Marine Corps consists of the Regular Marine Corps and the Marine Corps Reserve.

The Marine Corps maintains a very close relationship with the U.S. Navy, its sister service in the Department of the Navy. Although the Marine Corps has previously operated as an independent land force alongside the Army, its primary purpose is to serve as part of a unified naval service alongside the Navy in the maritime domain.

The U.S. Marine Corps is organized under the Department of the Navy, which is a military department under the leadership of the secretary of the Navy and the under secretary of the Navy.

The U.S. Marine Corps itself is led by the commandant of the Marine Corps and the assistant commandant of the Marine Corps, both generals who are advised by the sergeant major of the Marine Corps.

The Marine Corps statutory mission is outlined in 10 U.S.C. § 5063 and as originally introduced under the National Security Act of 1947, with its three primary areas of responsibility including:

- Seizure or defense of advanced naval bases and other land operations to support naval campaigns;
- Development of tactics, technique, and equipment used by amphibious landing forces in coordination with the Army and Air Force; and
- Such other duties as the president or Department of Defense may direct.

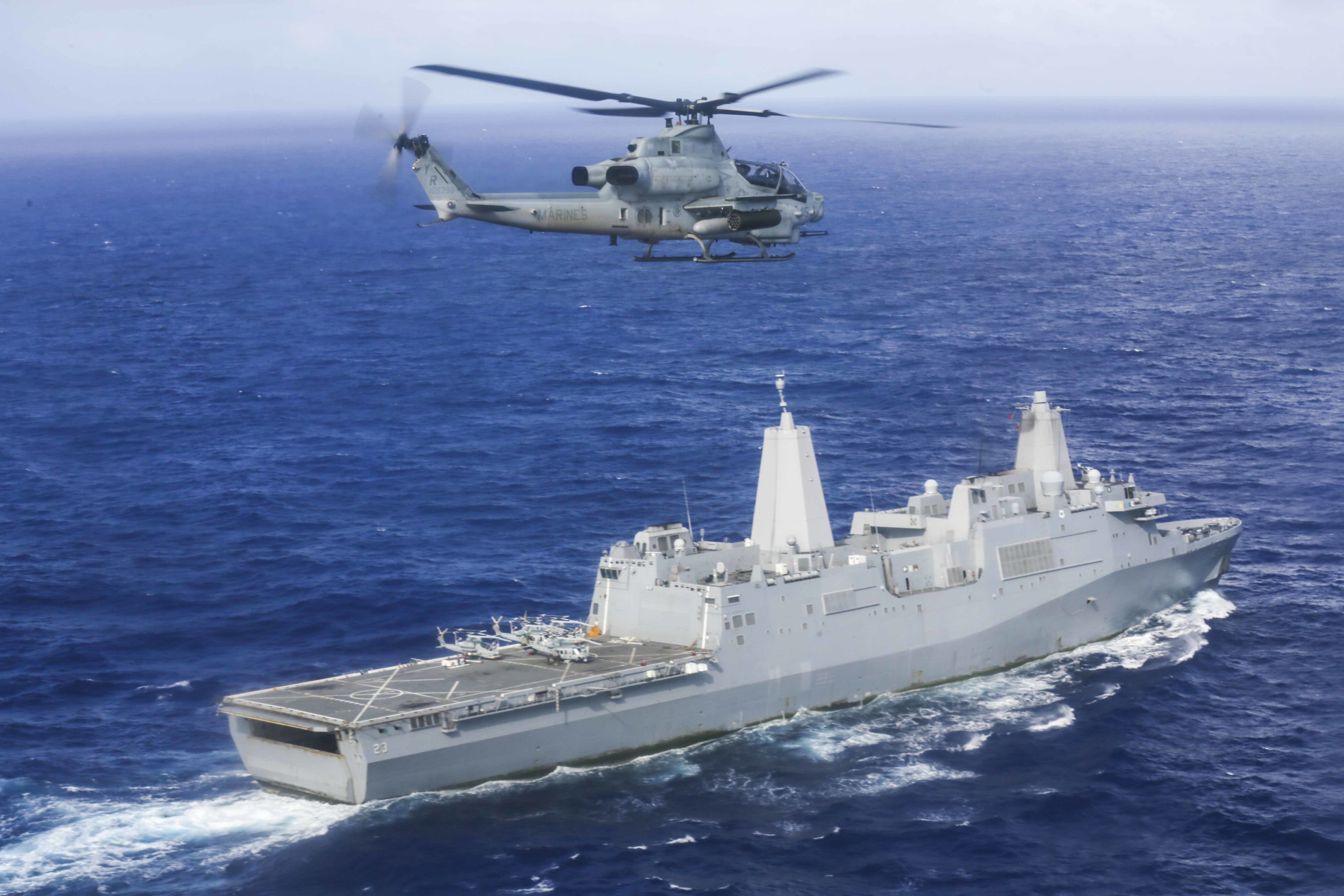
A 15th Marine Expeditionary Unit AH-1Z Viper flying over the USS Anchorage (LPD-23)

The seven specified functions of the Marine Corps are:

1. Seize and defend advanced naval bases or lodgments to facilitate subsequent joint operations.
2. Provide close air support for ground forces.
3. Conduct land and air operations essential to the prosecution of a naval campaign or as directed.
4. Conduct complex expeditionary operations in the urban littorals and other challenging environments.
5. Conduct amphibious operations, including engagement, crisis response, and power projection operations to assure access. The Marine Corps has primary responsibility for the development of amphibious doctrine, tactics, techniques, and equipment.
6. Conduct security and stability operations and assist with the initial establishment of a military government pending transfer of responsibility to other authorities.
7. Provide security detachments and units for service on armed vessels of the Navy, provide protection of naval property at naval stations and bases, provide security at designated U.S. embassies and consulates, and perform other such duties as the president or secretary of defense may direct. These additional duties may not detract from or interfere with the operations for which the Marine Corps is primarily organized.

Marine Corps Security Force Regiment is responsible for supporting the Navy with Marine security operations, while the Marine Security Guard protects embassies and consulates of the United States Department of State.

==== Fleet Marine Force ====
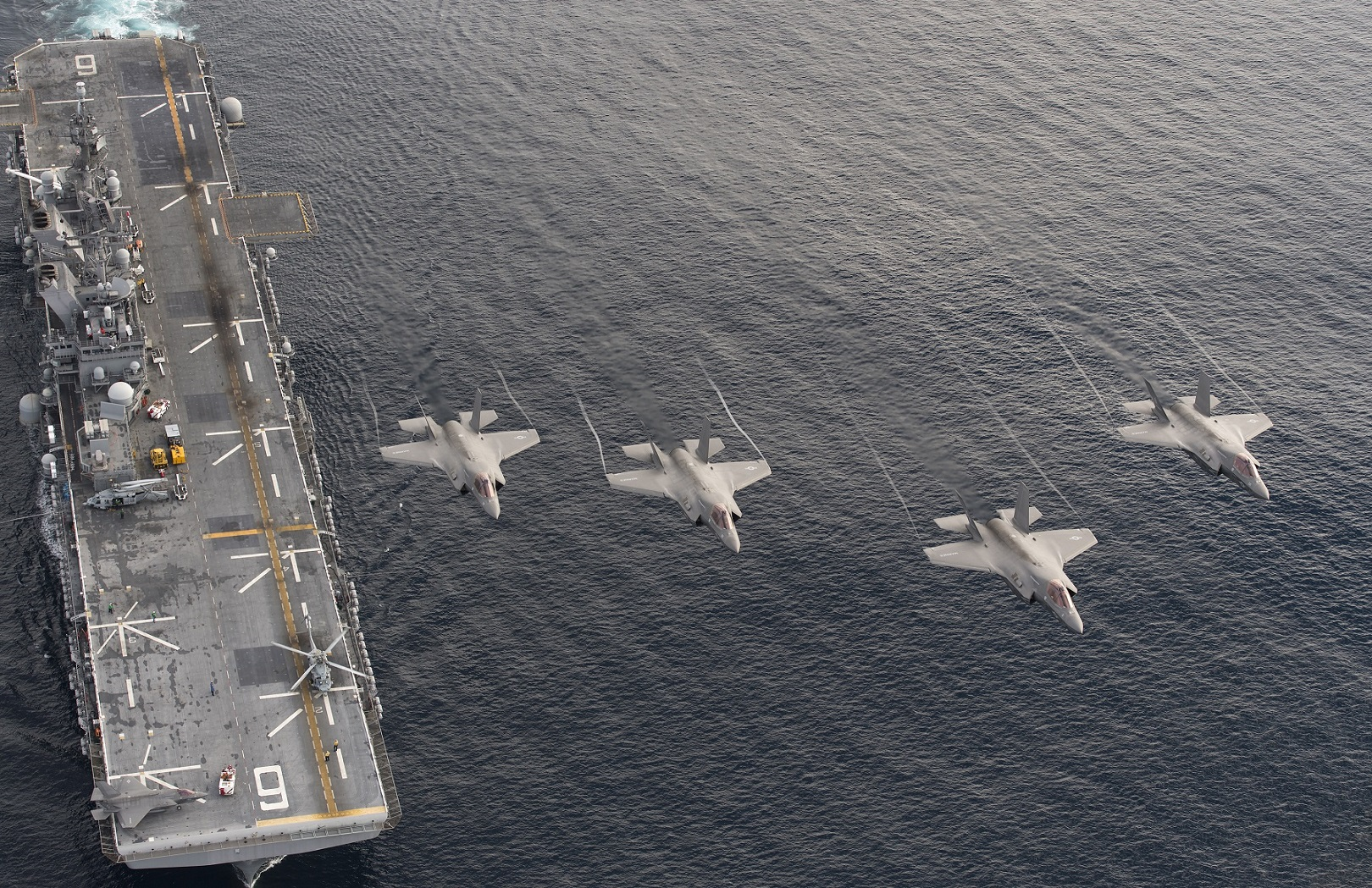
Four Marine Corps F-35B Lightning II stealth fighters flying over the USS America (LHA-6)

The combat power of the Marine Corps is centralized in the Fleet Marine Force (FMF), which itself is organized into Fleet Marine Force Atlantic, to support the U.S. Navy's Fleet Forces Command, and Fleet Marine Force Pacific, which supports the U.S. Navy's U.S. Pacific Fleet.

The basic Marine Corps unit for conducting operations is the Marine Air-Ground Task Force (MAGTF), which combines Marine Corps and Navy land, air, sea, and cyberspace capabilities into a single command. There are three size variants of a Marine Air-Ground Task Force, but each consists of a command element, ground combat element, aviation combat element, and logistics combat element.

A Marine ground combat element (GCE) is centered around Marine infantry, typically armed with a M27 Infantry Automatic Rifle.

Unlike the Army, the Marine Corps does not train its own combat medics, relying on the Navy to provide hospital corpsmen.

These infantry units are supported by Marine Corps combat engineers, who conduct engineer reconnaissance, obstacle system emplacement, and breaching operations; and Marine Corps Force Reconnaissance teams.

While the Marine Corps no longer operates its own tanks, opting to request support from the Army if needed, it maintains Light Armored Reconnaissance Battalions which operate the LAV-25 amphibious armored reconnaissance vehicle.

Assault Amphibian Battalions operate the Assault Amphibious Vehicle and Amphibious Combat Vehicle, which enable the ground combat element to conduct amphibious landing operations.

Marine Corps artillery operates the M777 howitzer and the M142 HIMARS, both supporting the ground combat element and the Navy at sea by striking enemy ships.

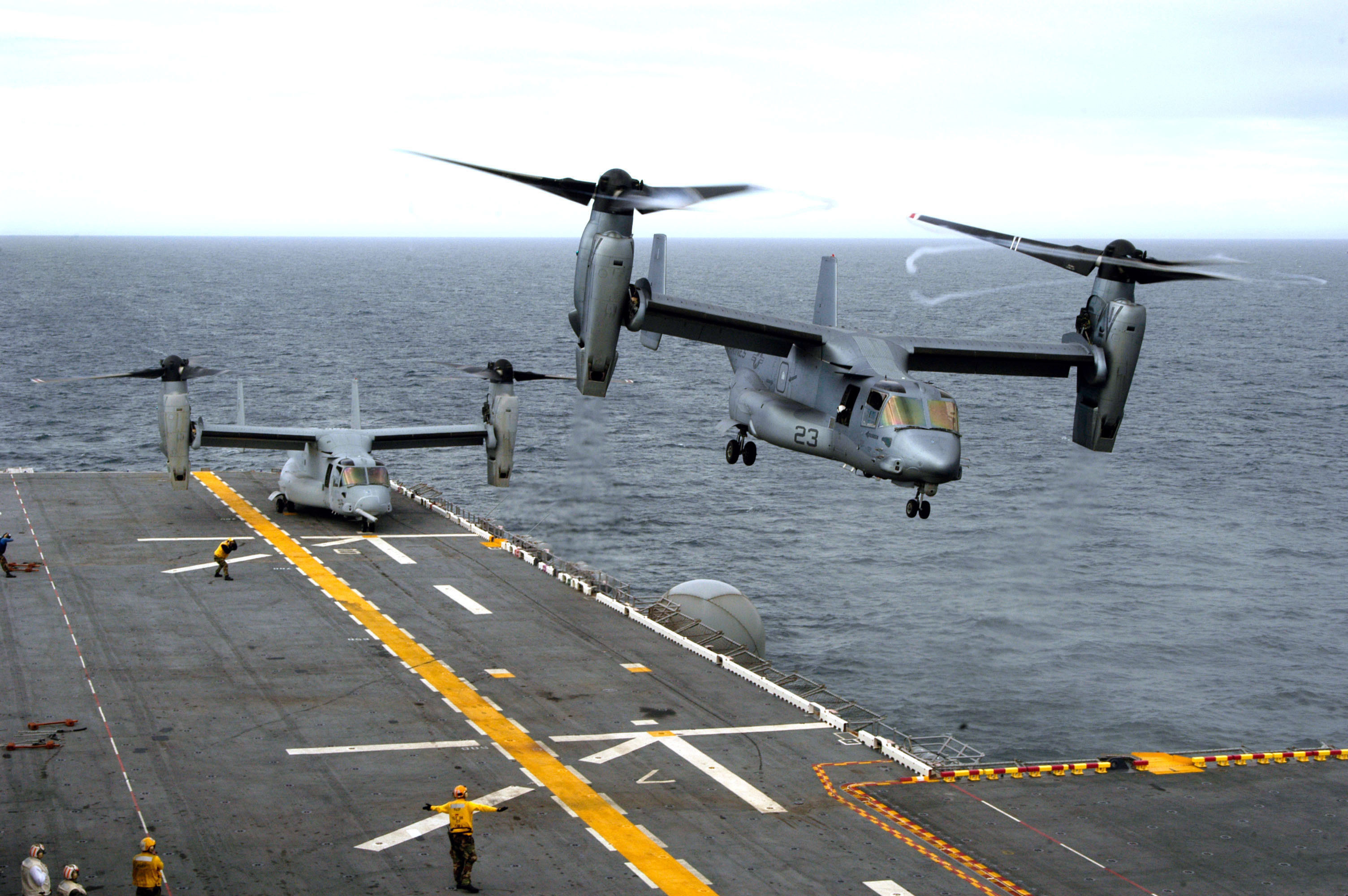
MV-22 Osprey tiltrotor aircraft from VMX-22 taking off from the USS Wasp (LHD-1)

The Marine aviation combat element (ACE) is the operational arm of Marine Corps Aviation, working to support the ground combat element. The F-35B Lightning II and AV-8B Harrier II are flown off Navy amphibious assault ships, while the F-35C Lightning II and F/A-18 Hornet are flown off Navy carriers by Marine Corps pilots.

The Marine Corps also operates the KC-130J to serve as a tanker and tactical airlift platform.

The UH-1Y Venom helicopter provides the Marine Corps with light transport and attack, while the AH-1Z Viper is a dedicated attack helicopter.

Medium-lift squadrons fly the MV-22 Osprey, while heavy-lift squadrons use the CH-53K King Stallion.

The Marine Corps has also begun flying unmanned aerial vehicles, such as the MQ-9 Reaper and MQ-8 Fire Scout. Notably, the aviation combat element also includes Low-Altitude Air Defense Battalions, which employ the FIM-92 Stinger surface-to-air missile.

The smallest MAGTF is the Marine Expeditionary Unit (MEU), which is typically forward deployed on a Navy ship. Commanded by a colonel, a Marine Expeditionary Unit consist of 2,200 marines split across a battalion landing team (ground combat element), a composite helicopter squadron (aviation combat element), and a combat logistics element (logistics element). Marine Expeditionary Units are supplied for 15 days. Forward deployed Marine Expeditionary Units are often embarked on Navy amphibious assault ships as part of an amphibious ready group.

The mid-sized MAGTF is the Marine Expeditionary Brigade (MEB), which is organized for specific missions. Commanded by a brigadier general, Marine Expeditionary Brigades consist of 4,000 to 16,000 marines across a Regimental-sized ground combat element, a Marine Aircraft Group, and a Combat Logistics Regiment. Marine Expeditionary Brigades are supplied for 30 days and offer increased firepower and airpower over the Marine Expeditionary Unit.

The largest MAGTF is the Marine Expeditionary Force (MEF), which is the primary warfighting force for larger operations. A Marine Expeditionary Force is commanded by a lieutenant general and consists of 46,000 to 90,000 marines. Currently there are only three Marine Expeditionary Forces, each with its own Marine Division, Marine Aircraft Wing, Marine Logistics Group, and Marine Expeditionary Force Information Group. Marine Expeditionary Forces are supplied for 60 days. Certain elements are held at the Marine Expeditionary Force level, such as Force Reconnaissance.

The MEF Information Group (MIG) also provides a number of functions such as the intelligence battalion; radio battalion which conducts signals intelligence, electronic warfare, and cyberspace operations; communications battalion; the MEF support battalion; and the Air Naval Gunfire Liaison Company.

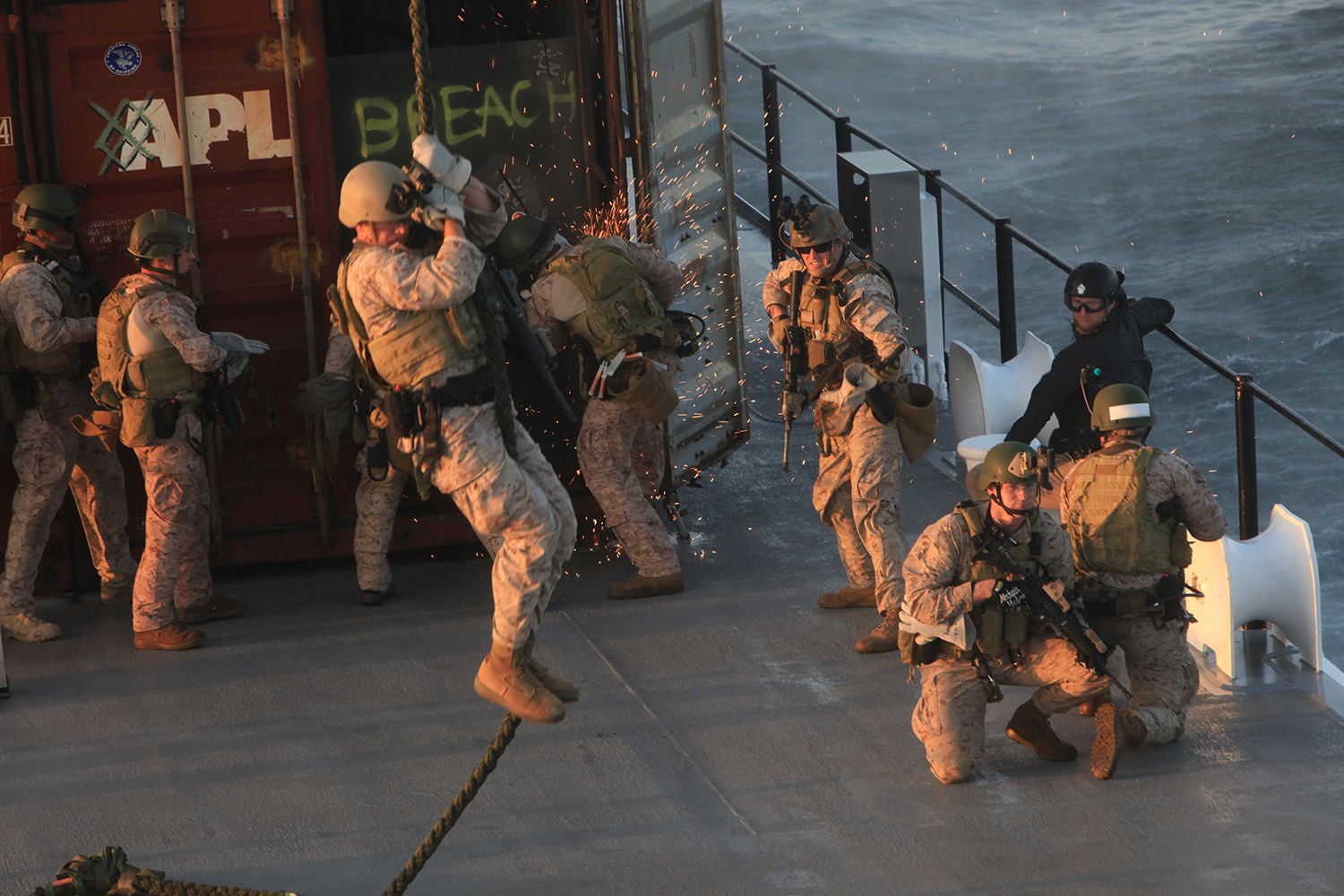
Marine raiders with the 1st Marine Raider Battalion conducting a visit, board, search, and seizure operation

While not a MAGTF, the Marine Corps has begun to reorganize some of its regiments into Marine Littoral Regiments (MRL), which are similar in size to a Marine Expeditionary Unit. A Marine Littoral Regiment is a self-deployable force, designed to be naval in nature and operate in the littoral region. A Marine Littoral Regiment consists of a littoral combat team, a littoral anti-air battalion, and a combat logistics battalion. Notably, the Marine Littoral Regiment has no aviation combat element, unlike a Marine Expeditionary Unit.

Another Marine Corps element that does not function as part of the MAGTF is the Marine Raider Regiment, functioning under United States Marine Forces Special Operations Command. Marine Raiders specialize in direct action, unconventional warfare, maritime interdiction, special reconnaissance, foreign internal defense, counterterrorism, and counterinsurgency missions.

==== Marine Corps commands ====
Under Headquarters Marine Corps, the Marine Corps is organized into the Fleet Marine Force, multiple commands, and Marine Corps service components to the unified combatant commands.

Name	Mission	Headquarters
Headquarters Marine Corps (HQMC)	Marine Corps service headquarters led by the commandant of the Marine Corps.	The Pentagon, Virginia
Fleet Marine Force
Fleet Marine Force, Atlantic (FMFLANT) / U.S. Marine Corps Forces Command (MARFORCOM)	Provides Marine Corps forces in support of the U.S. Navy's United States Fleet Forces Command. Also serves as United States Marine Corps Forces Command, commanding Marine Corps retained service forces and providing forces for joint, naval, and service requirements.	Naval Support Activity Hampton Roads, Virginia
Fleet Marine Force, Pacific (FMFPAC)	Provides Marine Corps forces in support of the U.S. Navy's United States Pacific Fleet.	Camp H. M. Smith, Hawaii
Marine Corps Systems Command (MARCORSYSCOM)	Acquisition command for all Marine Corps ground and information technology programs.	Marine Corps Base Quantico, Virginia
U.S. Marine Corps Forces Reserve (MARFORRES)	Oversees and maintains the U.S. Marine Corps reserve forces.	Marine Corps Support Facility New Orleans, Louisiana

=== U.S. Navy ===
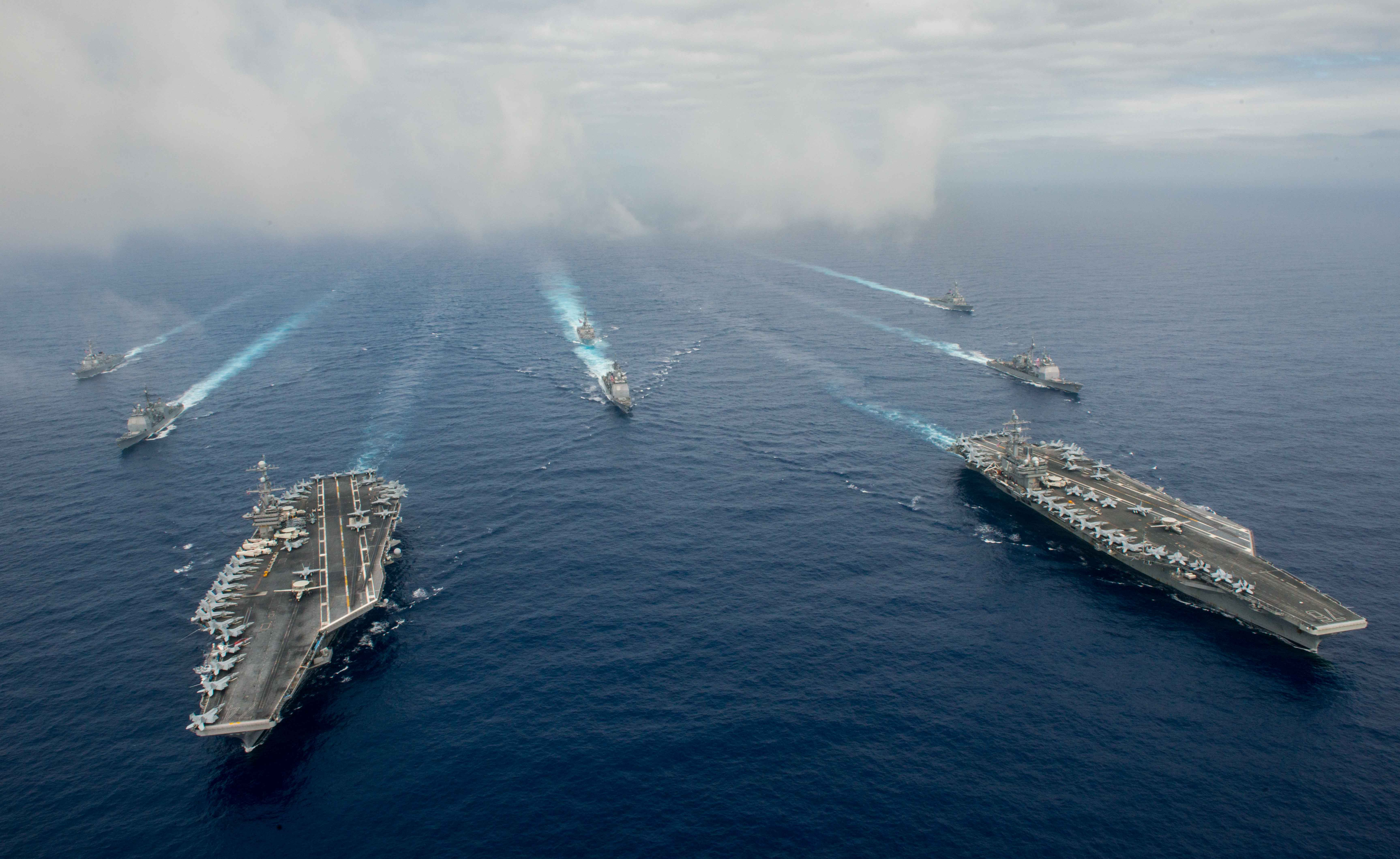
USS John C. Stennis (CVN-74) and USS Ronald Reagan (CVN-76) conducting dual carrier strike group operations as part of the United States Seventh Fleet

The United States Navy (USN) is the United States Armed Forces' maritime force. Originally established in 1775 as the Continental Navy, the U.S. Navy consists of the Regular Navy and the Navy Reserve. The Navy is the United States' principal maritime service, responsible for maritime warfare operations.

The U.S. Navy is organized under the Department of the Navy, which is a military department under the leadership of the secretary of the Navy and the under secretary of the Navy.

The U.S. Navy itself is led by the chief of naval operations and the vice chief of naval operations, both admirals who are advised by the master chief petty officer of the Navy.

The five enduring functions of the Navy are:

- Sea control
- Power projection
- Deterrence
- Maritime security
- Sealift

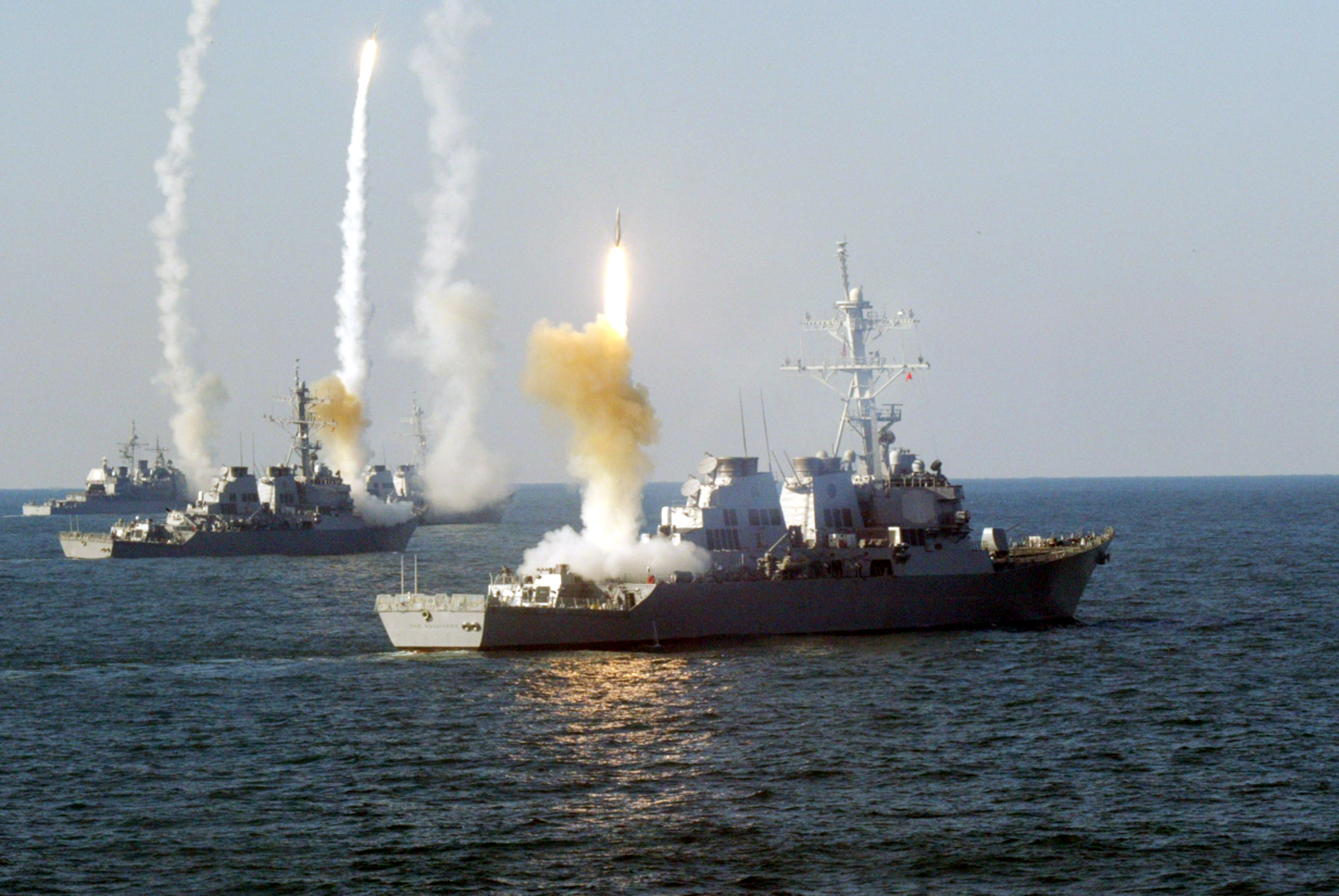
The USS Vicksburg (CG-69), USS Roosevelt (DDG-80), USS Carney (DDG-64), and USS The Sullivans (DDG-68) launching a coordinated missile volley

The nine specified tasks of the Navy are:

1. Conduct offensive and defensive operations associated with the maritime domain including achieving and maintaining sea control, to include subsurface, surface, land, air, space, and cyberspace.
2. Provide power projection through sea-based global strike, to include nuclear and conventional capabilities; interdiction and interception capabilities; maritime and littoral fires, to include naval surface fires; and close air support for ground forces.
3. Conduct ballistic missile defense. This is executed through the Navy's Aegis Ballistic Missile Defense System.
4. Conduct ocean, hydro, and river survey and reconstruction.
5. Conduct riverine operations. This is conducted by the Maritime Expeditionary Security Force and Naval Special Warfare Command.
6. Establish, maintain, and defend sea bases in support of naval, amphibious, land, air, or other joint operations as directed.
7. Provide naval expeditionary logistics to enhance the deployment, sustainment, and redeployment of naval forces and other forces operating within the maritime domain, to include joint sea bases, and provide sea transport for the Armed Forces other than which is organic to the individual military services, United States Special Operations Command, and United States Cyber Command. This is conducted by the Navy Expeditionary Logistics Support Group and Military Sealift Command.
8. Provide support for joint space operations to enhance naval operations, in coordination with the other military services (primarily the United States Space Force), combatant commands (primarily United States Space Command), and other U.S. government departments and agencies. U.S. Navy space operations are conducted by Navy Space Command.
9. Conduct nuclear operations in support of strategic deterrence, to include providing and maintaining nuclear surety and capabilities.

==== Naval Surface Forces ====
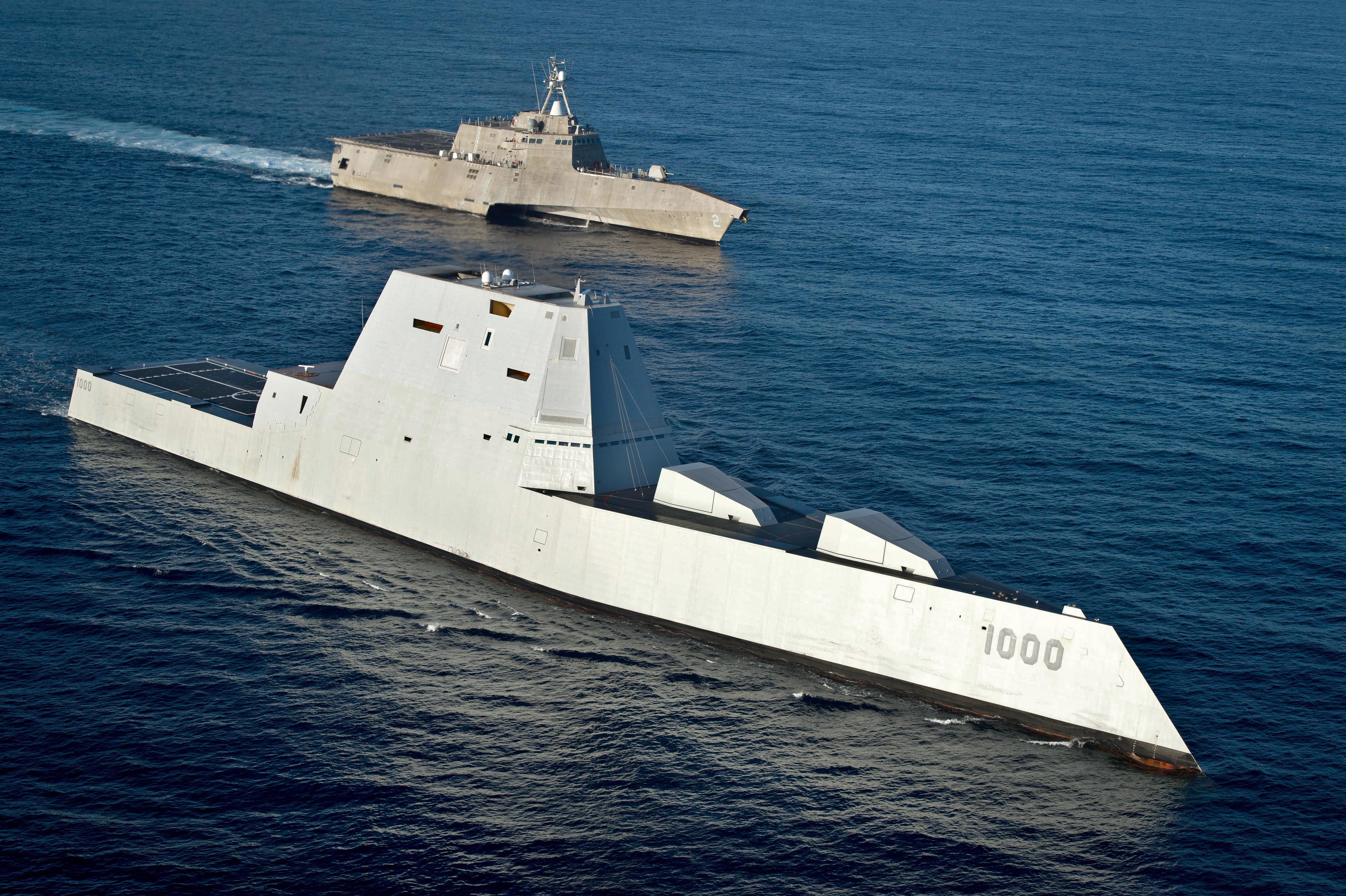
The stealth destroyer USS Zumwalt (DDG-1000) alongside the USS Independence (LCS-2)

The Naval Surface Forces (NAVSURFOR) is the backbone of the U.S. Navy's combat power, conducting surface warfare operations and operating its fleet of combat surface ships.

The Naval Surface Forces operates eleven nuclear-powered aircraft carriers (CVN), split between the Nimitz-class and the newer Gerald R. Ford-class. Aircraft carriers are the centerpiece of the U.S. Navy's combat power, forming the nucleus of its eleven carrier strike groups (CSG). Each aircraft carrier has an embarked carrier air wing from the Naval Air Forces.

The Naval Surface Forces also operate 116 surface combatants. These include the Ticonderoga-class guided-missile cruisers, Arleigh Burke-class guided-missile destroyers (DDG) and Zumwalt-class stealth guided-missile destroyers.

Cruisers and destroyers often operate as part of larger formations, where they serve as escorts for anti-aircraft and anti-submarine operations. However, they also are able to conduct sea control and striker operations ashore with their tomahawk cruise missiles.

The Navy also operates a complement of smaller Freedom-class and Independence-class littoral combat ships (LCS) that can be modularly reconfigured for specific mission sets.

Having lacked a frigate since the Oliver Hazard Perry-class was decommissioned, the Navy is in the process of acquiring the new Constellation-class guided-missile frigates (FFG).

Finally, the Naval Surface Forces operate 31 amphibious warfare ships to support the Fleet Marine Force and its embarked Marine Air-Ground Task Forces as part of an amphibious ready group or expeditionary strike group. This includes the America-class landing helicopter assault (LHA) ships which can carry U.S. Marine Corps F-35B Lightning II fighters and helicopters; and Wasp-class landing helicopter dock (LHD) ships, which can carry both F-35B fighters, helicopters, and landing craft. These are in addition to the San Antonio-class amphibious transport docks (LPD), and the Whidbey Island-class and Harpers Ferry-class dock landing ships.

==== Naval Submarine Forces ====
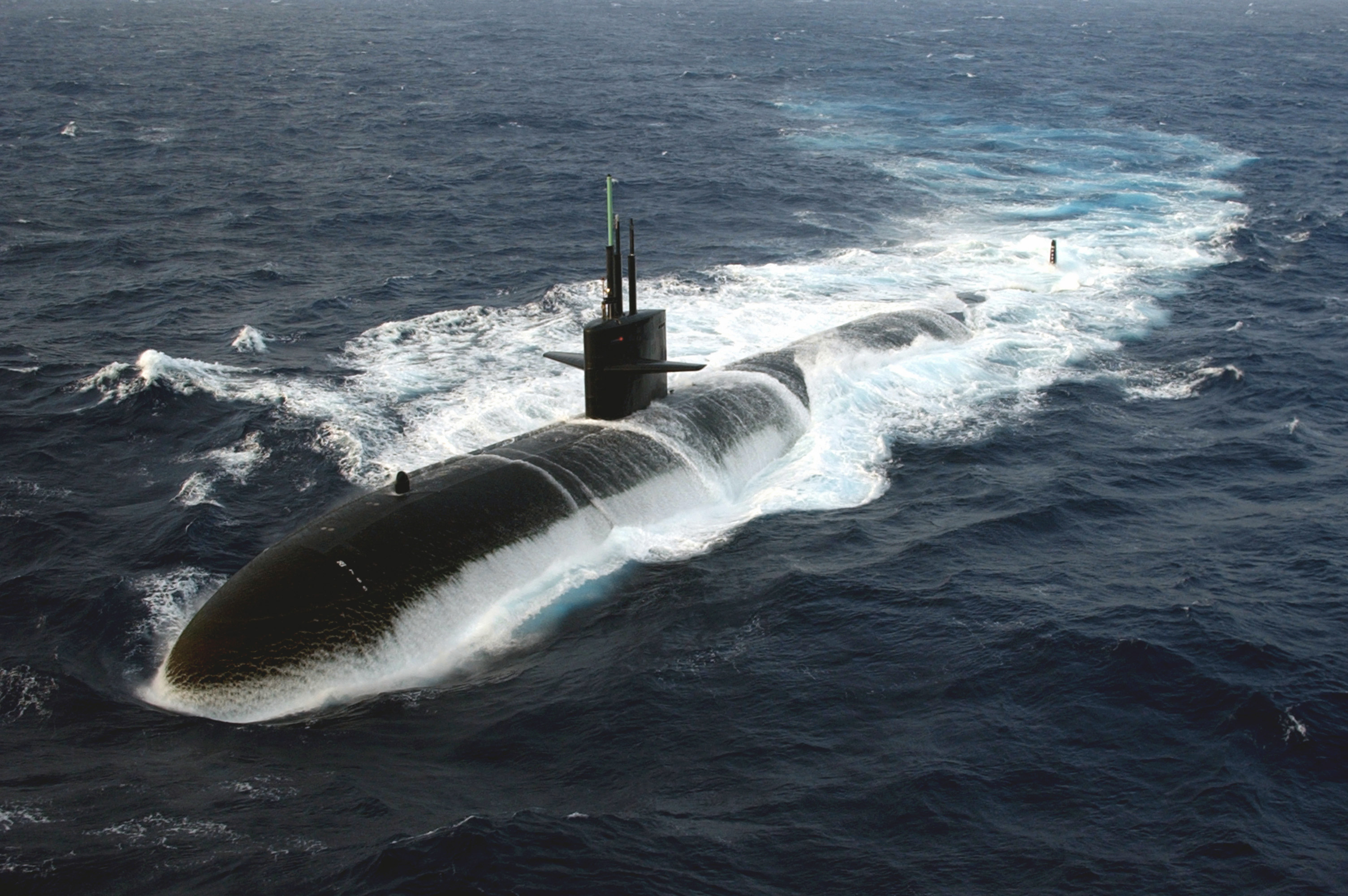
The USS Albuquerque (SSN-706) attack submarine underway in the Atlantic Ocean

The Naval Submarine Forces (NAVSUBFOR) is often referred to as the "silent service", consisting of 68 commissioned submarines.

Los Angeles-class, Seawolf-class, and Virginia-class nuclear-powered attack submarines are capable of performing sea control missions by destroying enemy submarines and surface ships, conducting surveillance and reconnaissance, performing irregular warfare, covert troop insertion, mine and anti-mine operations, and land attack missions with tomahawk cruise missiles.

Ohio-class nuclear-powered ballistic missile submarines (SSBN) have the sole mission of being launch platforms for the nuclear submarine-launched ballistic missile (SLBM). Each carries 20 UGM-133 Trident II SLBMs.

The Navy is currently in the process of procuring the Columbia-class SSBNs to replace the Ohio-class. Some Ohio-class submarines have been converted to cruise-missile submarines (SSGN), capable of carrying 154 tomahawk cruise missiles and deploying 66 special operations forces personnel, such as Navy SEALs.

==== Naval Air Forces ====
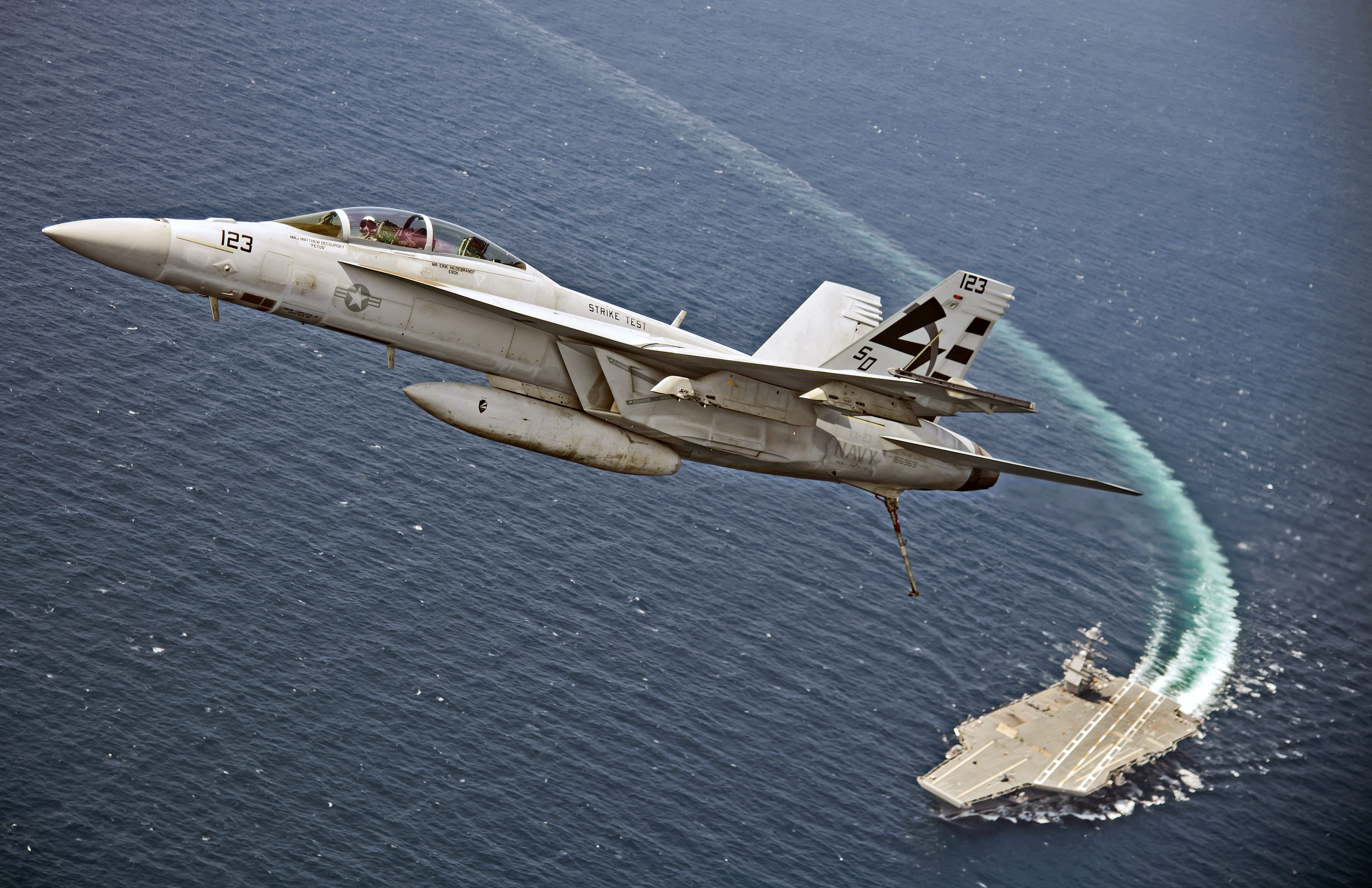
An F/A-18F Super Hornet from VX-23 flies over the USS Gerald R. Ford (CVN-78), the world's largest aircraft carrier, and the largest warship ever constructed

The Naval Air Forces (NAVAIRFOR) is the Navy's naval aviation arm, centered around the carrier air wing. The core of the carrier air wing are the Naval Air Forces strike fighter squadrons (VFA), which fly the F-35C Lightning II stealth fighter and the F/A-18E/F Super Hornet.

A variant of the F/A-18, the EA-18G Growler is an electronic-warfare aircraft flown by electronic attack squadrons (VAQ) off of carriers or land bases.

The E-2 Hawkeye provides carriers with airborne early warning and command-and-control, while the C-2A Greyhound keeps carriers supplied.

The CMV-22B Osprey is currently in the process of replacing the C-2 Greyhound for carrier resupply.

The Naval Air Forces also operate the MH-60 Seahawk for anti-submarine warfare, anti-ship warfare, and search and rescue operations.

The MH-53E is primarily used for anti-mine warfare but can also be used for assault support.

Although primarily centered on carriers, the Naval Air Forces do operate a small number of land-based aircraft. These include the P-3C Orion and P-8A Poseidon, which conduct anti-submarine warfare operations and serve as maritime patrol aircraft, alongside the unmanned MQ-4C Triton.

The E-6 Mercury is also flown by the Navy to communicate instructions to U.S. strategic forces.

==== Navy commands ====
The U.S. Navy is organized into eight navy component commands, which command operational forces and serve as joint force maritime component commands; fifteen shore commands, which support the fleets' operating forces; five systems commands, which oversee the technical requirements of the Navy; and nine type commands, which administratively manage units of a certain type.

Name	Mission	Headquarters
Office of the Chief of Naval Operations (OPNAV)	Navy service headquarters led by the chief of naval operations.	The Pentagon, Virginia
Navy operating forces
U.S. Fleet Forces Command (USFF) / U.S. Naval Forces Northern Command (NAVFORNORTH)	Trains, certifies, and provides Navy forces for naval, joint, and combined operations. Navy service component and joint force maritime component command to United States Northern Command and United States Strategic Command.	Naval Support Activity Hampton Roads, Virginia
U.S. Pacific Fleet (PACFLT)	Navy service component and joint force maritime component command to United States Indo-Pacific Command.	Naval Station Pearl Harbor, Hawaii
U.S. Naval Forces Central Command (NAVCENT)	Navy service component and joint force maritime component command to United States Central Command.	Naval Support Activity Bahrain
U.S. Fleet Cyber Command (FCC) / U.S. Navy Space Command (NAVSPACE)	Navy service component to United States Cyber Command and United States Space Command.	Fort Meade, Maryland
U.S. Naval Forces Europe and Africa (NAVEUR–NAVAF)	Navy service component and joint force maritime component command to United States European Command and United States Africa Command.	Naval Support Activity Naples, Italy
U.S. Naval Forces Southern Command (NAVSO)	Navy service component and joint force maritime component command to United States Southern Command.	Naval Station Mayport, Florida
U.S. Naval Special Warfare Command (USNSWC)	Navy service component to United States Special Operations Command.	Naval Amphibious Base Coronado, California
Military Sealift Command (MSC)	Navy service component and joint force maritime component command to United States Transportation Command.	Naval Station Norfolk, Virginia
U.S. Navy Reserve (USNR)	Oversees and maintains Navy reserve forces.	Naval Support Activity Hampton Roads, Virginia

=== U.S. Air Force ===
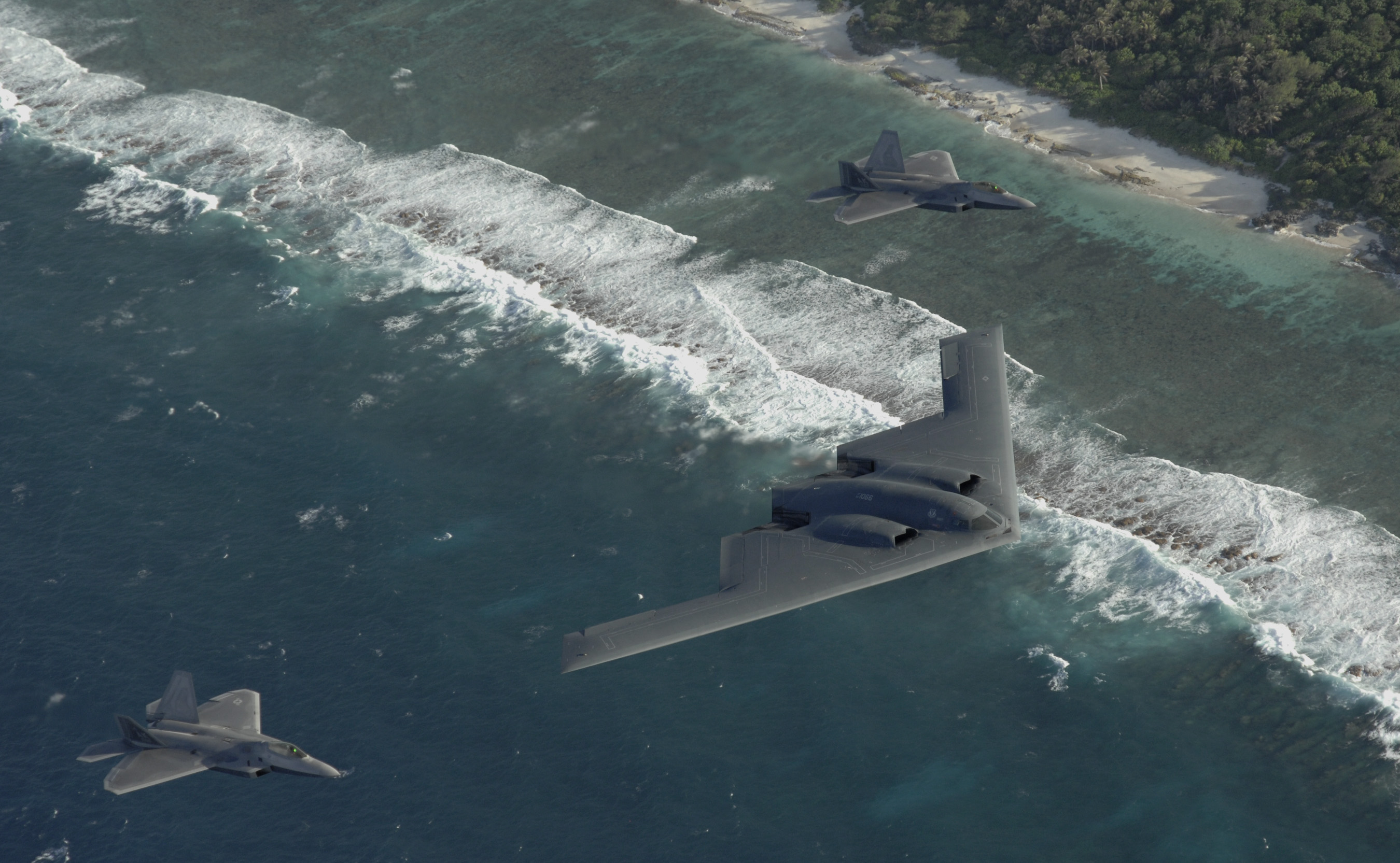
A B-2A Spirit stealth bomber from the 509th Bomb Wing escorted by two F-22A Raptor stealth fighters from the 3rd Wing

The United States Air Force (USAF) is the United States Armed Forces' air force originally established in 1947 when it gained independence from the U.S. Army, it traces its history back through the United States Army Air Forces, United States Army Air Corps, United States Army Air Service, the Division of Military Aeronautics, Aviation Section, U.S. Signal Corps, to the birth of Aeronautical Division, U.S. Signal Corps on 1 August 1907.

The U.S. Air Force serves as the principal air service, responsible for aerial warfare operations. The U.S. Air Force is composed of the Regular Air Force, Air Force Reserve, and Air National Guard.

The U.S. Air Force is organized under the Department of the Air Force, which is a military department under the leadership of the secretary of the Air Force and under secretary of the Air Force.

The U.S. Air Force itself is led by the chief of staff of the Air Force and vice chief of staff of the Air Force, both generals who are advised by the chief master sergeant of the Air Force.

The five core missions of the Air Force are:

- Air superiority
- Global integrated intelligence, surveillance, and reconnaissance
- Rapid global mobility
- Global strike
- Command and control

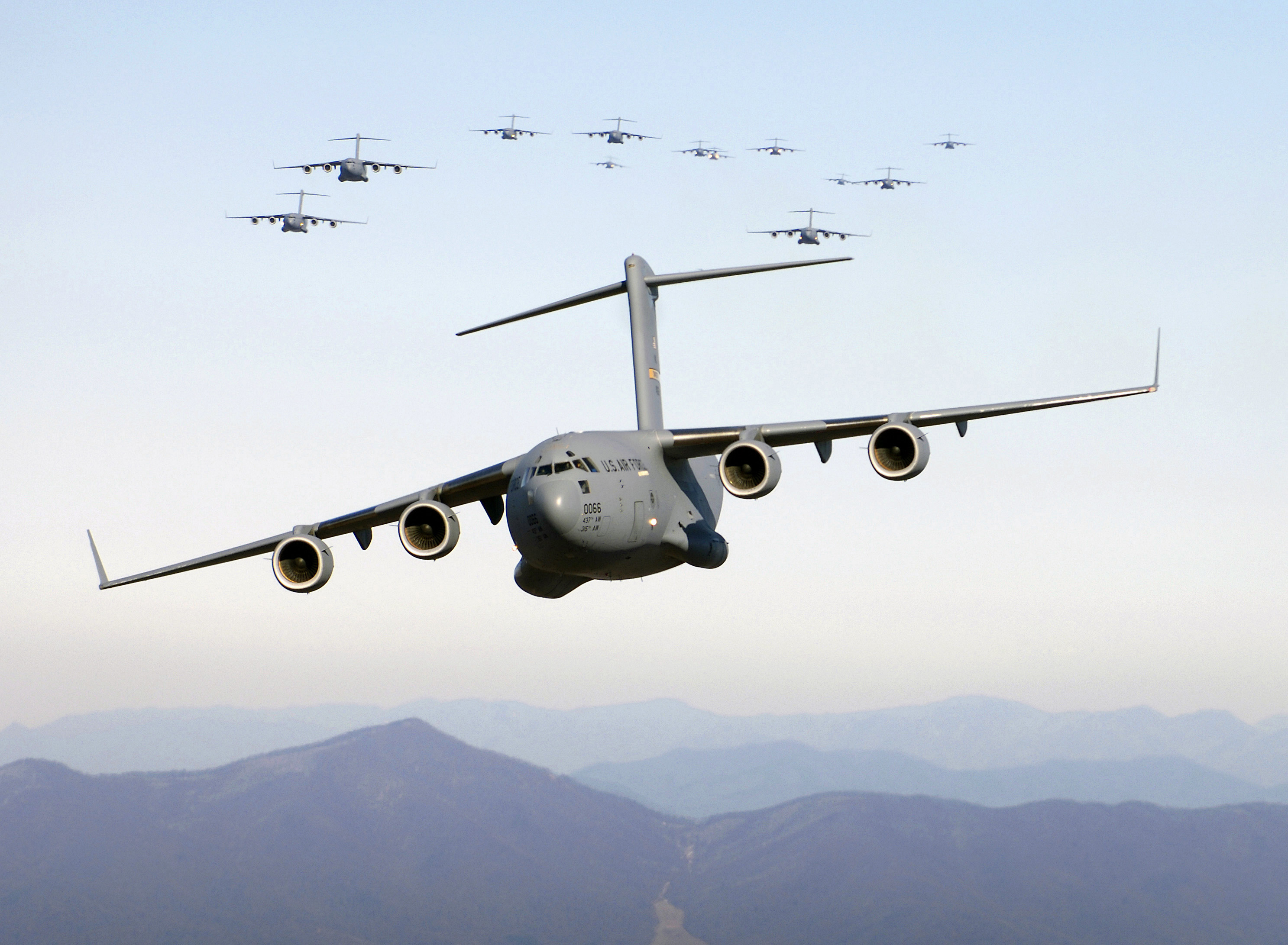
Air Mobility Command C-17 Globemasters performing low-level flight training

The eight specified functions of the Air Force are:

1. Conduct nuclear operations in support of strategic deterrence, to include providing and maintaining nuclear surety and capabilities.
2. Conduct offensive and defensive operations, to include appropriate air and missile defense, to gain and maintain air superiority and air supremacy as required, to enable the conduct of operations by U.S. and allied land, sea, air, space, and special operations forces.
3. Conduct global precision attack, to include strategic attack, interdiction, close air support, and prompt global strike.
4. Provide timely, globally integrated intelligence, surveillance, and reconnaissance capability and capacity from forward deployed locations and globally distributed centers to support world-wide operations.
5. Provide rapid global mobility to employ and sustain organic air and space forces and other military service and U. S. Special Operations Command forces, as directed, to include airlift forces for airborne operations, air logistical support, tanker forces for in-flight refueling, and assets for aeromedical evacuation.
6. Provide agile combat support to enhance the air and space campaign and the deployment, employment, sustainment, and redeployment of air and space forces and other forces operating within the air and space domains, to include joint air and space bases, and for the Armed Forces other than which is organic to the individual military services and U.S. Special Operations Command in coordination with the other military services, combatant commands, and U.S. Government departments and agencies.
7. Conduct global personnel recovery operations including theater-wide combat and civil search and rescue in coordination with the other military services, combatant commands, and DoD components.
8. Conduct globally integrated command and control for air and space operations.

==== Combat Air Force ====
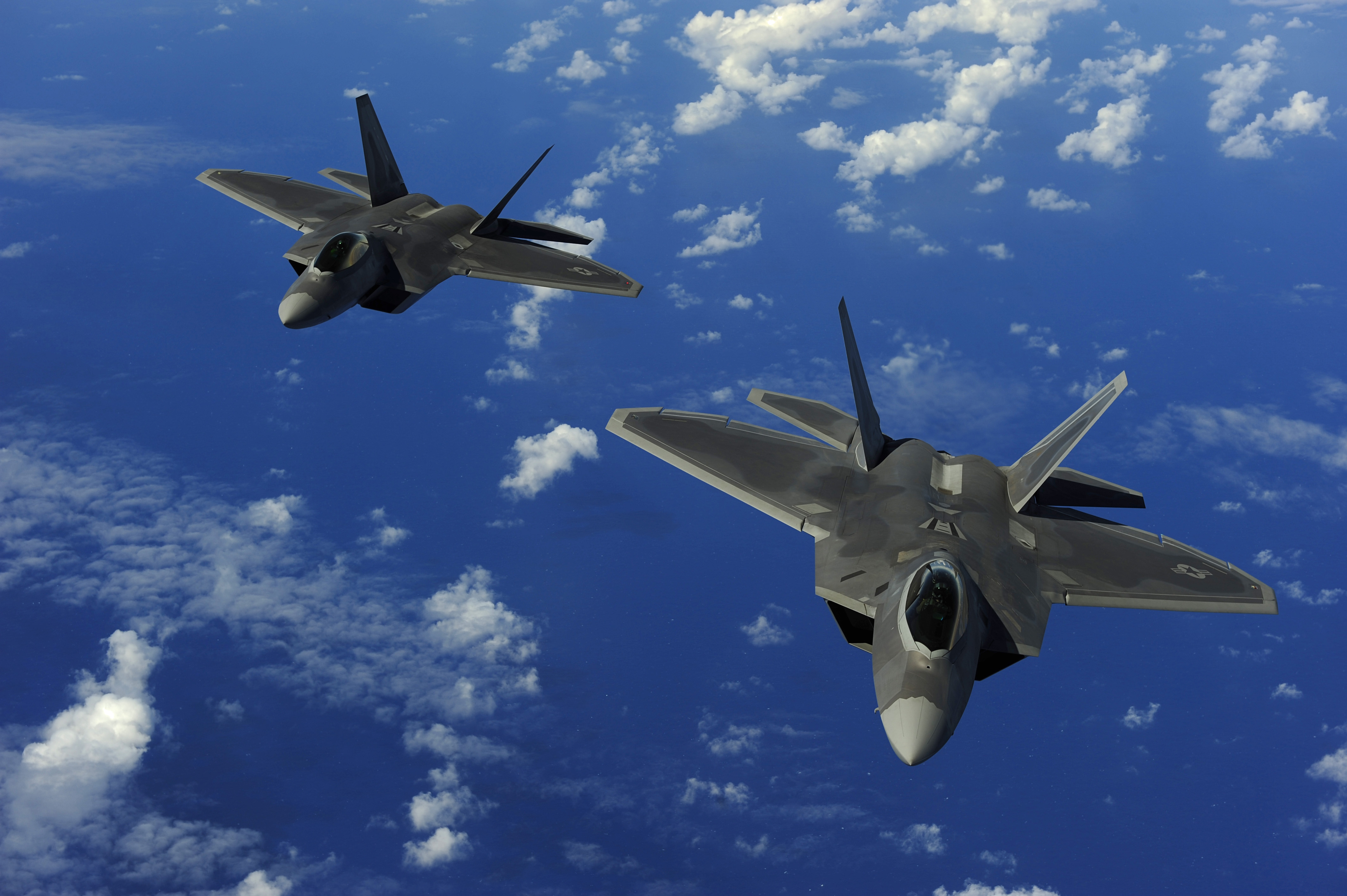
Two F-22A Raptors from the 90th Fighter Squadron

The Combat Air Force (CAF) comprises the majority of the Air Force's combat power, consisting of its fighter, bomber, intercontinental ballistic missile, and special operations forces.

The Air Force's fighter forces are led by Air Combat Command's Fifteenth Air Force, with other fighter units under Pacific Air Forces and United States Air Forces in Europe. Air Force fighters are predominantly used to achieve air superiority and strike enemy ground and naval forces.

The Air Force operates an expanding force of fifth-generation fighters. The F-22A Raptor stealth fighter is designed to replace the F-15C in air superiority operations carrying two AIM-9 Sidewinder and six AIM-120 AMRAAM missiles. It also has a significant air-to-ground mission, carrying two GBU-32 Joint Direct Attack Munition bombs, in addition to two AIM-9 and two AIM-120 missiles. Ultimately, the F-22 is intended to be replaced by the sixth-generation fighter, Next Generation Air Dominance program. The F-22 is complemented by the more numerous F-35A Lightning II multi-role stealth fighters, which are in the process of replacing the F-16C fighters and A-10 attack aircraft in air superiority and ground attack roles, to include the nuclear strike mission.

The Air Force still operates an extremely sizable force of fourth-generation fighters. The F-15C Eagle is a dedicated air superiority fighter, while the F-15E Strike Eagle has been modified to be a dual-role strike fighter, carrying both conventional and nuclear weapons. The F-15C Eagle and F-15E Strike Eagle are both being replaced by the F-15EX Eagle II, which is significantly more advanced.

The F-16C Fighting Falcon is a multirole fighter that has served as the primary Air Force fighter for decades, including as a dual-capable tactical nuclear strike fighter.

The A-10C Thunderbolt II attack aircraft has been the first Air Force fighter specifically designed for close air support missions, operating against enemy ground forces and light naval ships with its GAU-8 Avenger gatling cannon and array of air-to-ground munitions.

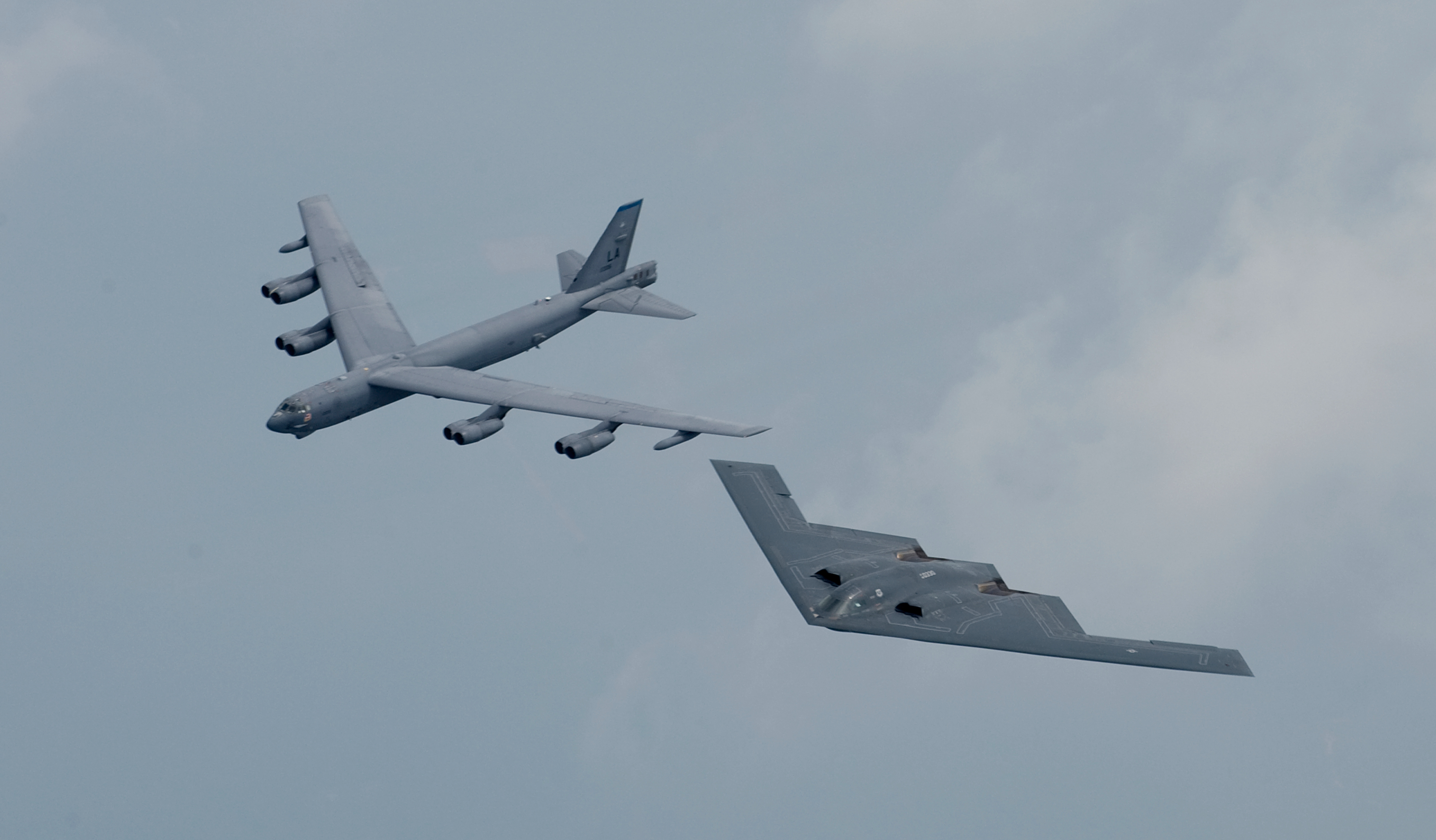
A B-52 Stratofortress of the 2nd Bomb Wing and a B-2A Spirit of the 509th Bomb Wing flying in formation

The Air Force's bomber forces are organized under Air Force Global Strike Command's Eighth Air Force, executing long-range strike operations. The B-2A Spirit stealth bomber is capable of conducting both conventional and nuclear strike operations flying through air defenses.

The B-1B Lancer, in contrast, is a supersonic bomber that carries only conventional munitions and serves as the backbone of the bomber force. Both the B-2A Spirit and the B-1B Lancer are being replaced by the B-21 Raider stealth bomber, which can be equipped with both conventional and nuclear munitions.

The B-52H Stratofortress is a long-range, heavy bomber that the Air Force has flown since the 1950s and operates a variety of conventional and nuclear munitions, including the AGM-86 air-launched cruise missile.

The Air Force's intercontinental ballistic missile forces are organized under Air Force Global Strike Command's Twentieth Air Force, serving as the land component of the nuclear triad.

The LGM-30G Minuteman III serves as the only ballistic missile operated by the Air Force, with 400 stationed in hardened silos. The LGM-30G will be replaced by the LGM-35A Sentinel intercontinental ballistic missile.

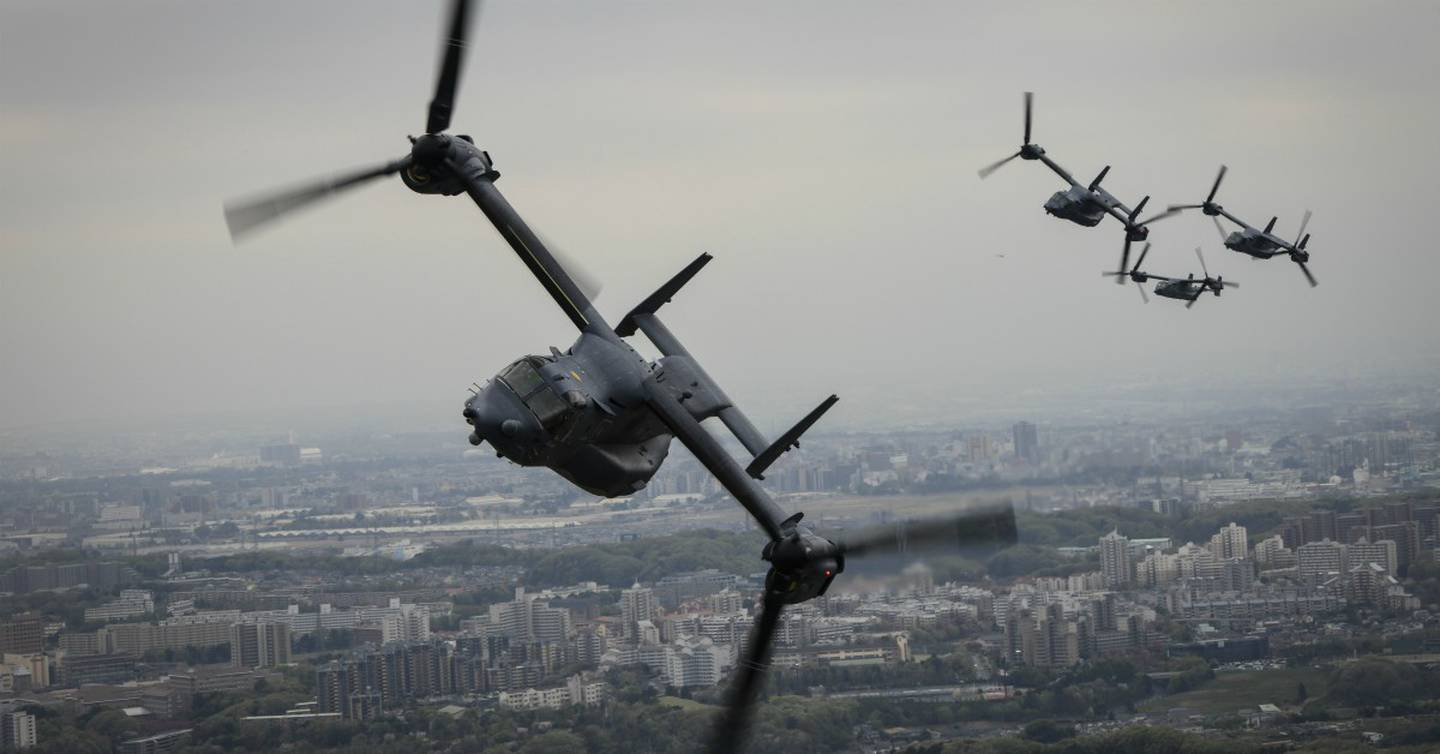
A formation of CV-22 Ospreys from the 353rd Special Operations Group

The Air Force's special operations forces are organized under Air Force Special Operations Command, consisting of both special operations aviation and Air Force special tactics airmen on the ground. The AC-130J Ghostrider gunships have the primary mission of close air support and air interdiction, using cannons and precision guided munitions.

The MC-130J Commando II, also a variant of the C-130 Hercules, fly exfiltration and resupply operations for special operations forces, alongside conducting air-to-air refueling for helicopters.

The CV-22 Osprey is a tiltrotor aircraft used for the infiltration and exfiltration of special operations forces.

While not under Air Force Special Operations Command, rescue operations are supported by the HC-130J Combat King II and HH-60W Jolly Green II combat rescue aircraft.

The MQ-9 Reaper also serves as a remotely piloted intelligence and strike aircraft, serving under Air Force Special Operations Command and Air Combat Command.

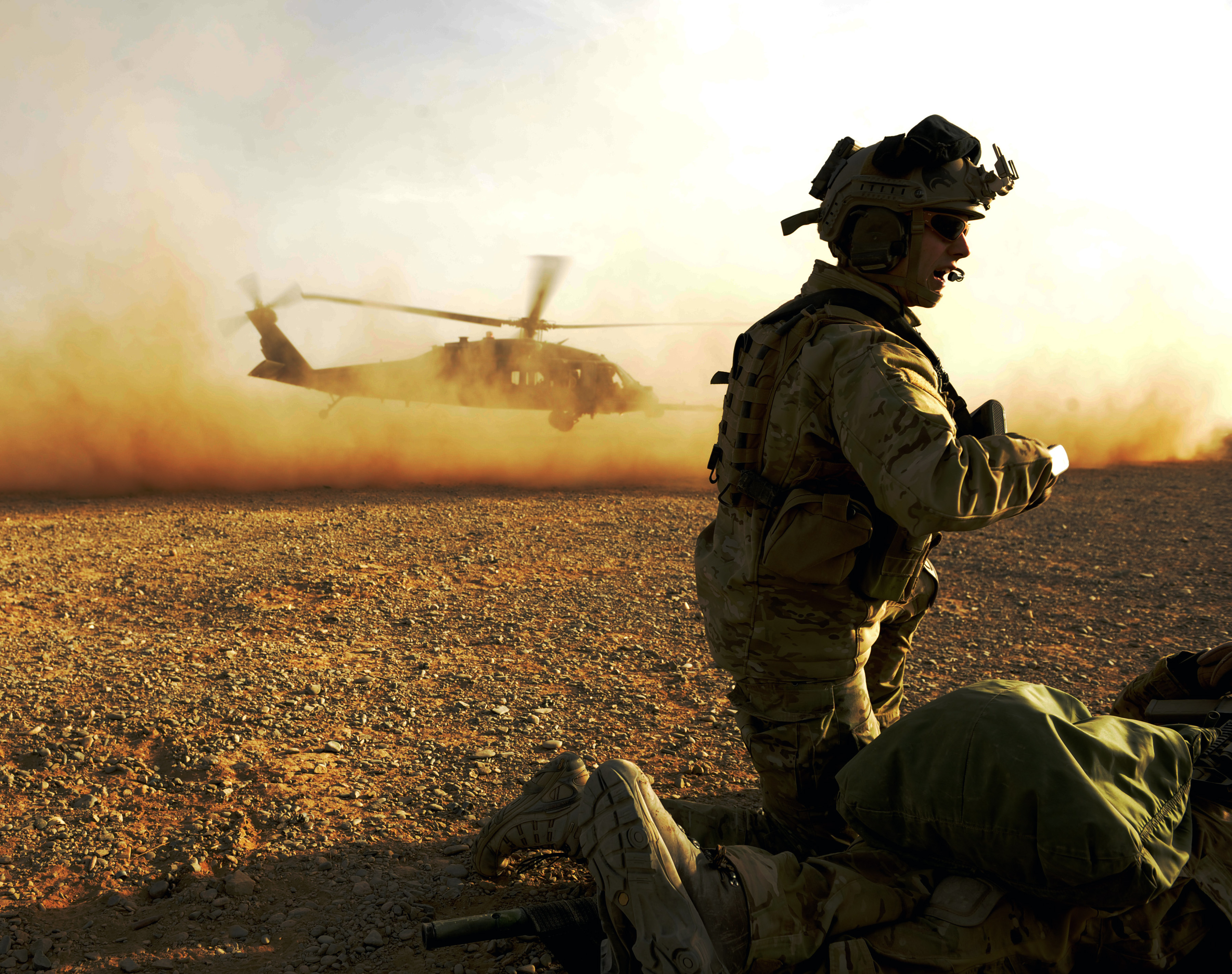
Air Force Pararescue with a HH-60 helicopter in the background

Air Force Special Tactics are the ground special warfare force of the U.S. Air Force, integrating air-ground operations. Special Tactics conduct four core missions.

Global access teams assess and open airfields, ranging from international airports to dirt strips, in permissive or hostile locations to facilitate the landing and operation of air forces. Precision strike teams are trained to direct aircraft and other forces to conduct kinetic and non-kinetic strikes, as well as humanitarian aid drops.Special Tactics teams also conduct personnel recovery missions, possessing significant medical and rescue experience.Finally, Special Operations Surgical Teams conduct surgery and medical operations in battlefield operations in support of special operations.

The Air Force also operates a wide array of reconnaissance aircraft under Air Combat Command's Sixteenth Air Force, including the RQ-4 Global Hawk drone, U-2 Dragon Lady, and RC-135 Rivet Joint.

Air Force operations are typically supported by command and control aircraft, such as the E-3 Sentry airborne warning and control system. The E-3 Sentry is in the process of being replaced by the E-7A Wedgetail.

==== Mobility Air Force ====
The Mobility Air Force (MAF) is organized under Air Mobility Command and comprises the Air Force's airlift, air refueling, and aeromedical evacuation forces.

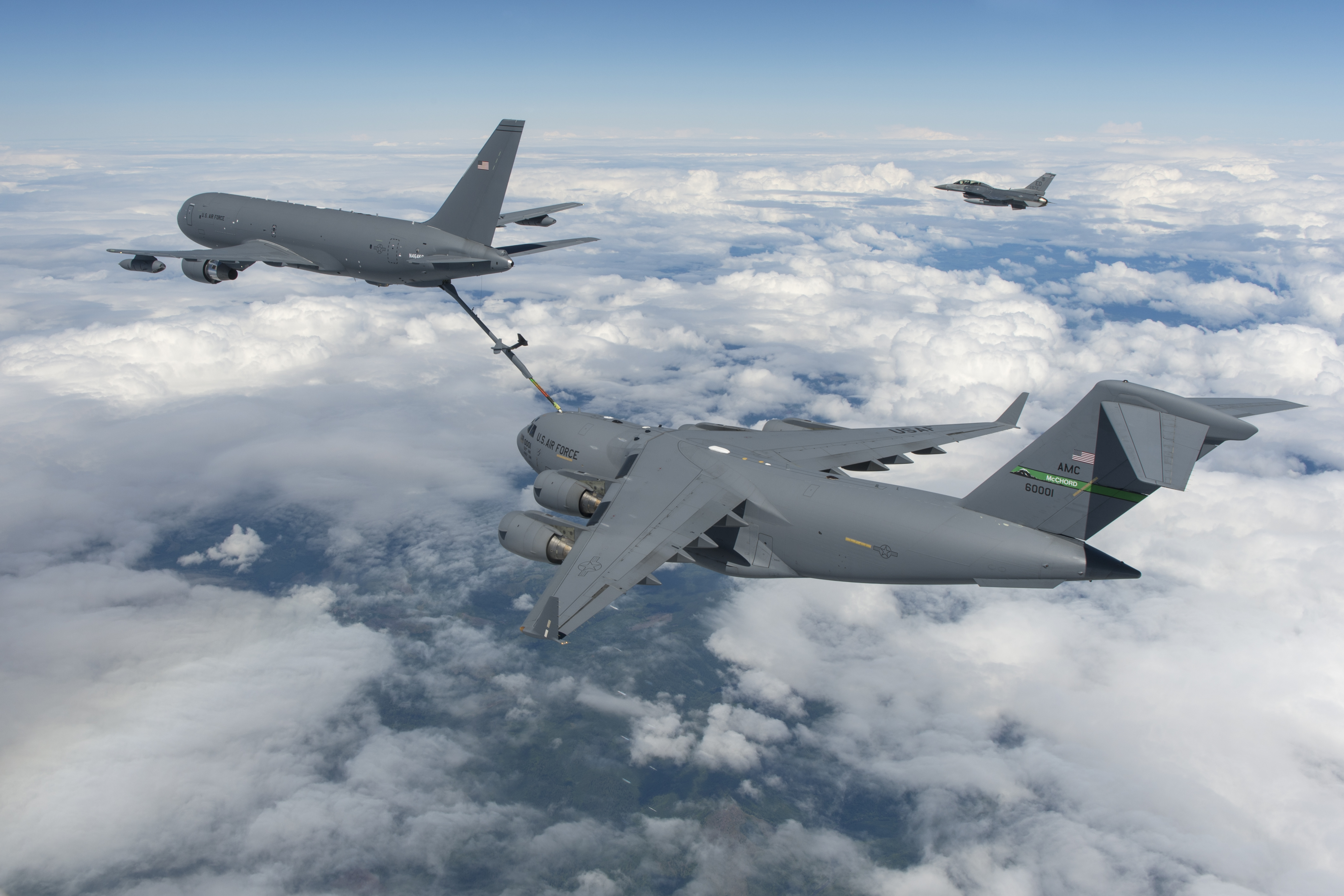
A KC-46A Pegasus refueling a C-17A Globemaster III

The airlift forces operate three different major aircraft. The C-5M Super Galaxy is the largest aircraft in the Air Force, serving as a strategic transport aircraft.

The C-17A Globemaster III is the airlift force's most flexible aircraft, conducting both strategic and tactical airlift operations. It is also capable of conducting airborne operations for the Army and aerial resupply through airdropping cargo.

Finally, the C-130J Super Hercules is a tactical airlifter, conducting both cargo airlift and supporting Army airborne operations.

Other major airlift platforms include the VC-25, which serves as the personal plane of the president of the United States, better known as Air Force One.

The Air Force also operates three major aerial refueling tankers. The KC-46A Pegasus is its most modern tanker, replacing the aging KC-10A Extenders. The remaining tanker is the KC-135 Stratotanker, which has flown since the 1950s. Tankers are also capable of conducting limited airlift operations.

==== Air Force commands ====
The U.S. Air Force is organized into nine major commands, which conduct the majority of the service's organize, train, and equip functions. It commands forces attached to the combatant commands as joint force air component commands.

Name	Mission	Headquarters
Headquarters Air Force (HAF)	Air Force service headquarters led by the chief of staff of the Air Force.	The Pentagon, Virginia
Major Commands and Air National Guard
Air Combat Command (ACC)	Primary provider of combat air forces to the unified combatant commands. Air Combat Command operates fighter, reconnaissance, battle-management, and electronic-combat aircraft.	Joint Base Langley-Eustis, Virginia
Air Education and Training Command (AETC)	Recruits, trains, and educates airmen and develops Air Force doctrine.	Joint Base San Antonio, Texas
Air Force Materiel Command (AFMC)	Manages installation and mission support, discovery and development, test and evaluation, and life cycle management services and sustainment for every major Air Force weapon system.	Wright-Patterson Air Force Base, Ohio
Air Force Global Strike Command (AFGSC)	Operates the Air Force strategic bomber and intercontinental ballistic missile forces. Air Force component and joint force air component command for United States Strategic Command.	Barksdale Air Force Base, Louisiana
Air Force Special Operations Command (AFSOC)	Organizes, trains, and equips air commandos. Air Force component and joint force air component command for United States Special Operations Command.	Hurlburt Field, Florida
Air Mobility Command (AMC)	Primary provider of air mobility forces to the unified combatant commands. Air Force component and joint force air component command for United States Transportation Command.	Scott Air Force Base, Illinois
Pacific Air Forces (PACAF)	Air Force component and joint force air component command for United States Indo-Pacific Command.	Joint Base Pearl Harbor–Hickam, Hawaii
United States Air Forces in Europe – Air Forces Africa (USAFE–AFAFRICA)	Air Force component and joint force air component command for United States European Command and United States Africa Command.	Ramstein Air Base, Germany
Air Force Reserve Command (AFRC)	Manages Air Force reserve forces.	Robins Air Force Base, Georgia
Air National Guard (ANG)	Air Force component of the National Guard.	The Pentagon, Virginia

=== U.S. Space Force ===
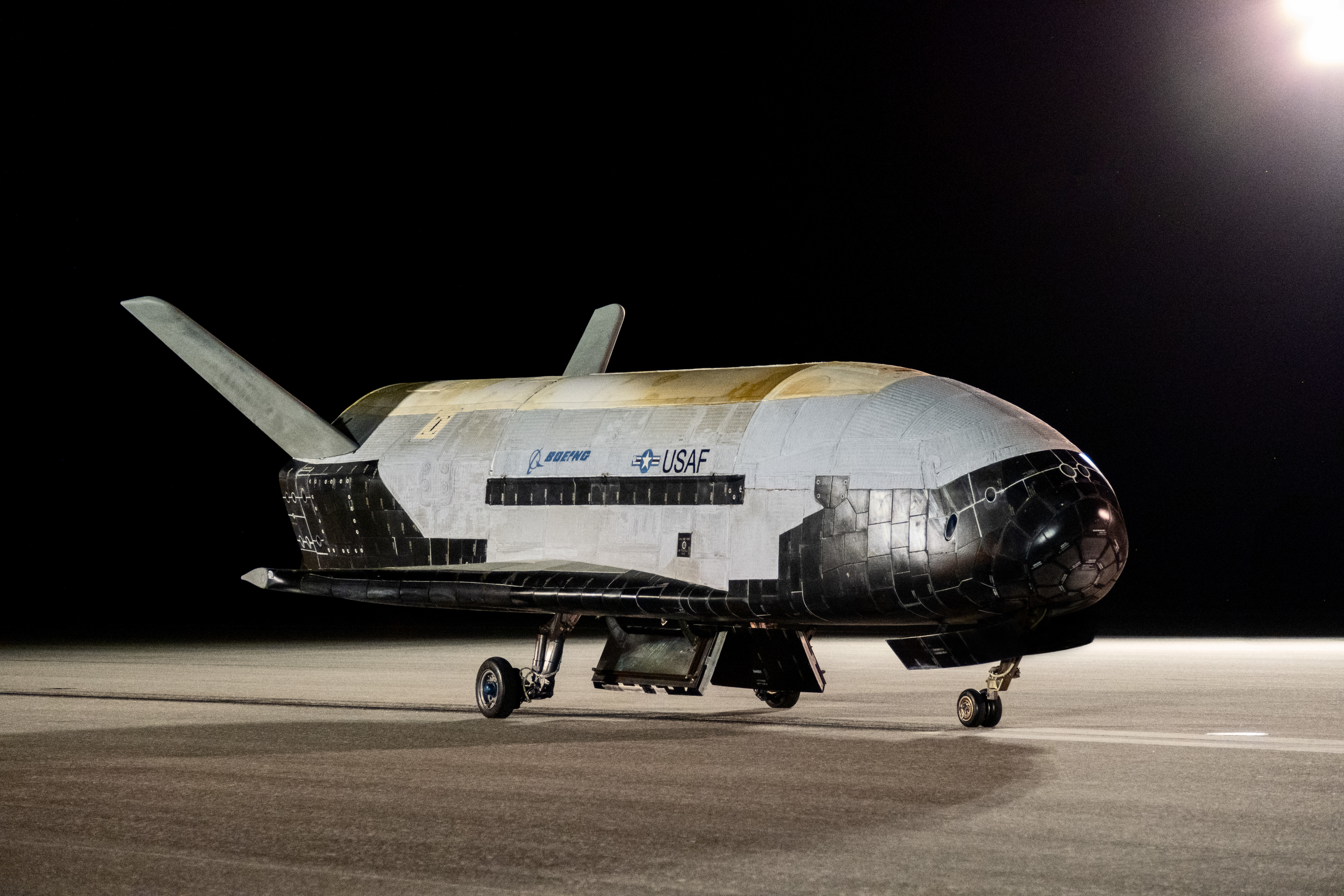
Boeing X-37B spaceplane after deorbiting and landing

The United States Space Force (USSF) is the United States Armed Forces' space force and is the newest military branch. Originally established in 2019, it traces its history through Air Force Space Command and the Western Development Division to 1954.

The United States Space Force is the principal space service, responsible for space warfare operations. The U.S. Space Force is composed of the Regular Space Force, not yet having organized a reserve component outside of the Air Force.

The U.S. Space Force is organized under the Department of the Air Force, which is a military department under the leadership of the secretary of the Air Force and under secretary of the Air Force.

The U.S. Space Force itself is led by the chief of space operations and vice chief of space operations, both generals who are advised by the chief master sergeant of the Space Force.

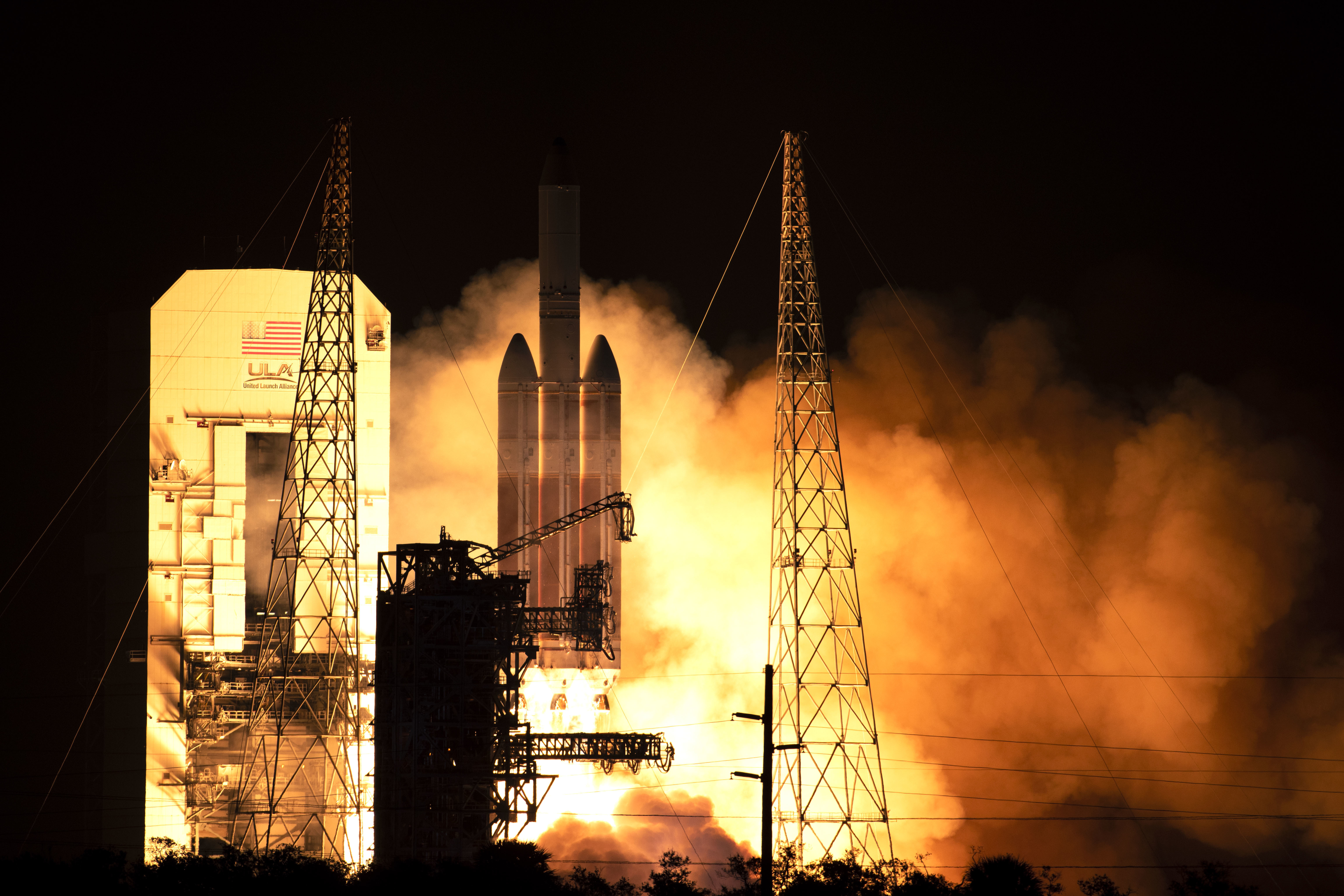
Delta IV Heavy launch for the NROL-44 mission

The five core competencies of the Space Force are:

- Space security
- Combat power projection
- Space mobility and logistics
- Information mobility
- Space domain awareness

The five specified functions of the Space Force are:

1. Provide freedom of operation for the United States in, from, and to space.
2. Provide prompt and sustained space operations.
3. Protect the interests of the United States in space.
4. Deter aggression in, from, and to space.
5. Conduct space operations.

==== Orbital warfare and space electromagnetic warfare ====
The Space Force's combat power is centered around Space Delta 3, which conducts space electromagnetic warfare and Space Delta 9, which conducts orbital warfare.

Combat power projection operations ensure freedom of action in space for the U.S. and its allies and denies an adversary freedom of action in space.

These are divided into offensive and defensive space operations.

Defensive operations preserve and protect U.S. and allied space capabilities, which are further sub-divided into active and passive actions.

Offensive operations target a U.S. adversary's space and counterspace capabilities, achieving space superiority.

Orbital warfare forces conduct protect-and-defend operations and provide U.S. national decision authorities with response options to deter and, when necessary, defeat orbital threats.

The space electromagnetic warfare forces conduct offensive and defensive space control operations. Space Force cyber forces conduct defensive cyber operations to protect space assets.

==== Cyber operations and Satellite Control Network ====
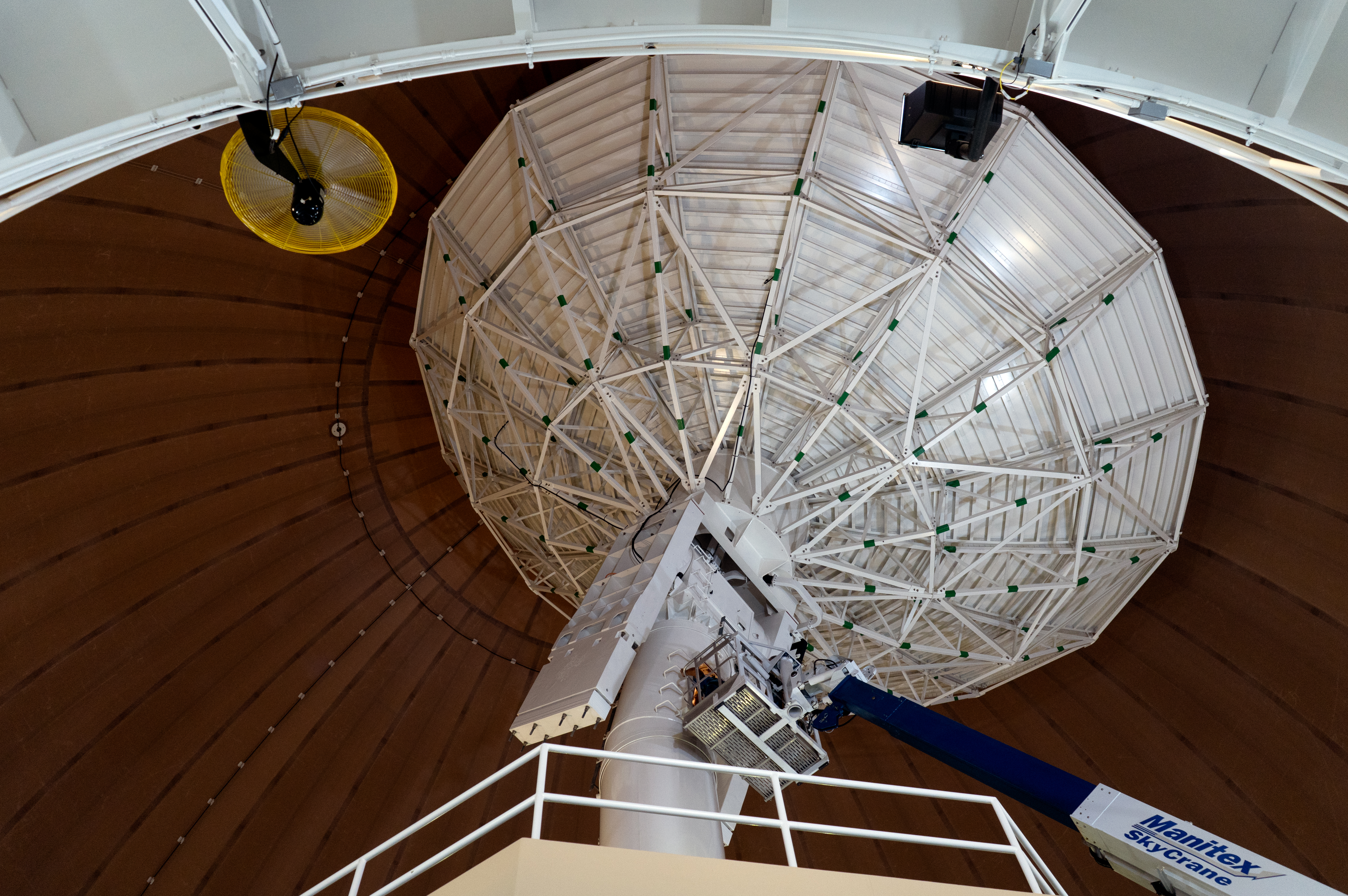
Satellite Control Network antenna at Kaena Point Space Force Station

Although the U.S. Space Force is not a cyber force, it does conduct extensive cyber operations under Space Delta 6.

The primary focus of Space Force cyber operations is defending U.S. Space Force networks and ensuring the operations of its spacecraft, which are controlled remotely from ground stations. All space operations units have cyber squadrons assigned to defend them and incorporate offensive cyber operations.

Additionally, Space Delta 6 is responsible for managing the Satellite Control Network, a global network of antennas used to communicate with the service's spacecraft.

The 22nd Space Operations Squadron is responsible for overall operations, with the 21st Space Operations Squadron and 23rd Space Operations Squadron managing the ground station sites at Vandenberg Space Force Base, New Boston Space Force Station, Kaena Point Space Force Station, Diego Garcia, Guam, Greenland, and the United Kingdom.

==== Space domain awareness ====
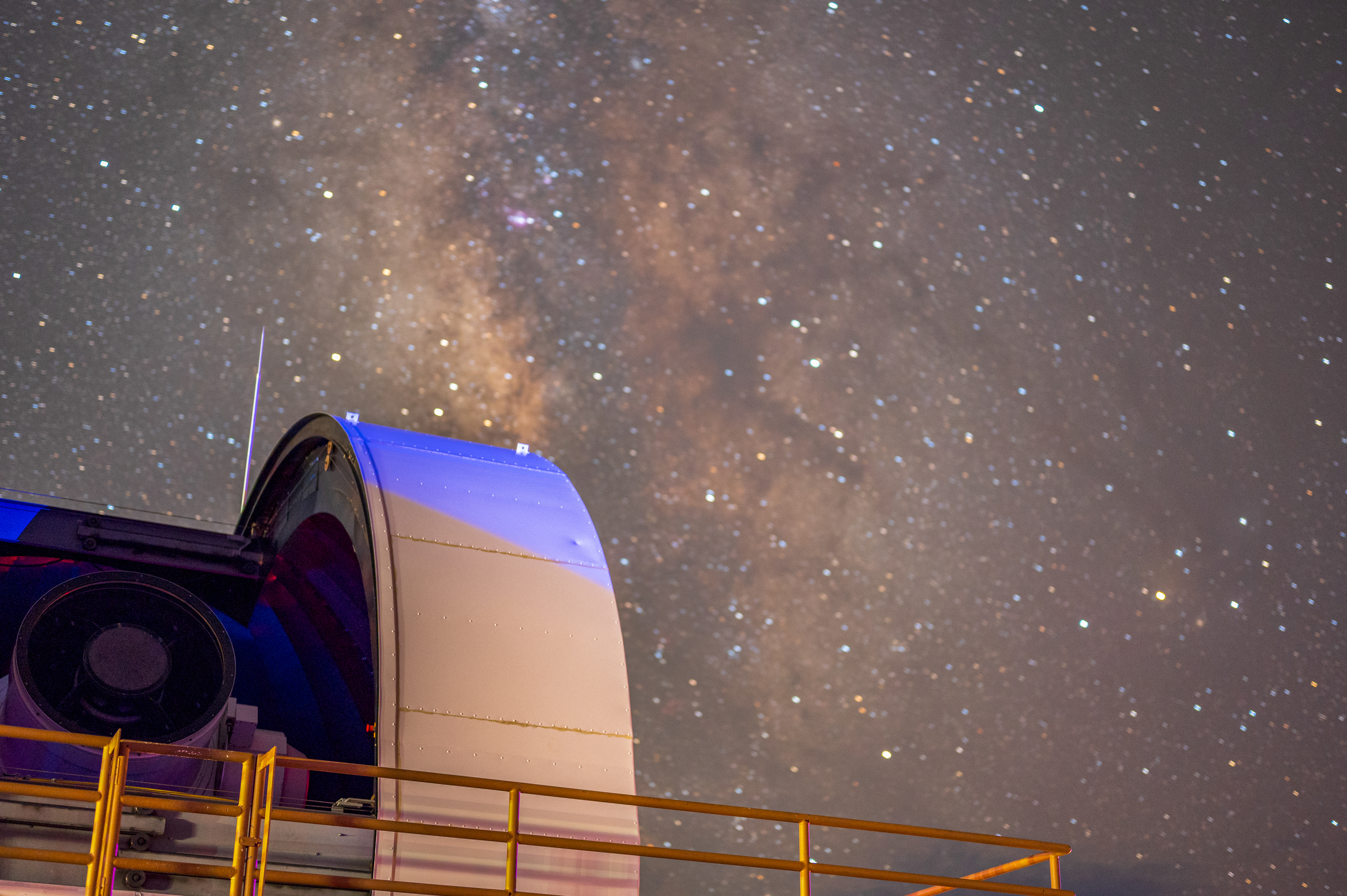
15th Space Surveillance Squadron GEODSS telescope at White Sands Missile Range

The Space Force's Space Delta 2 operates the United States Space Surveillance Network, tracking 47,000 objects in space as of 2022.

Space domain awareness encompasses the identification, characterization, and understanding of any factor associated with the space domain that could affect space operations.

Space Delta 2 sensors include the AN/FPS-85 phased array radar at Eglin Air Force Base and the Space Fence radar at Kwajalein Atoll operated by the 20th Space Surveillance Squadron; and a global network of three Ground-based Electro-Optical Deep Space Surveillance telescopes operated by the 15th Space Surveillance Squadron.

The 18th Space Defense Squadron, collocated with the Combined Space Operations Center, executes command and control of the Space Surveillance Network and manages the Space Catalog of all objects in Earth orbit.

The 19th Space Defense Squadron focuses on objects further in cislunar space, beyond geosynchronous orbit, with a specific focus on supporting NASA's Artemis program and other human spaceflight operations.

==== Missile warning ====
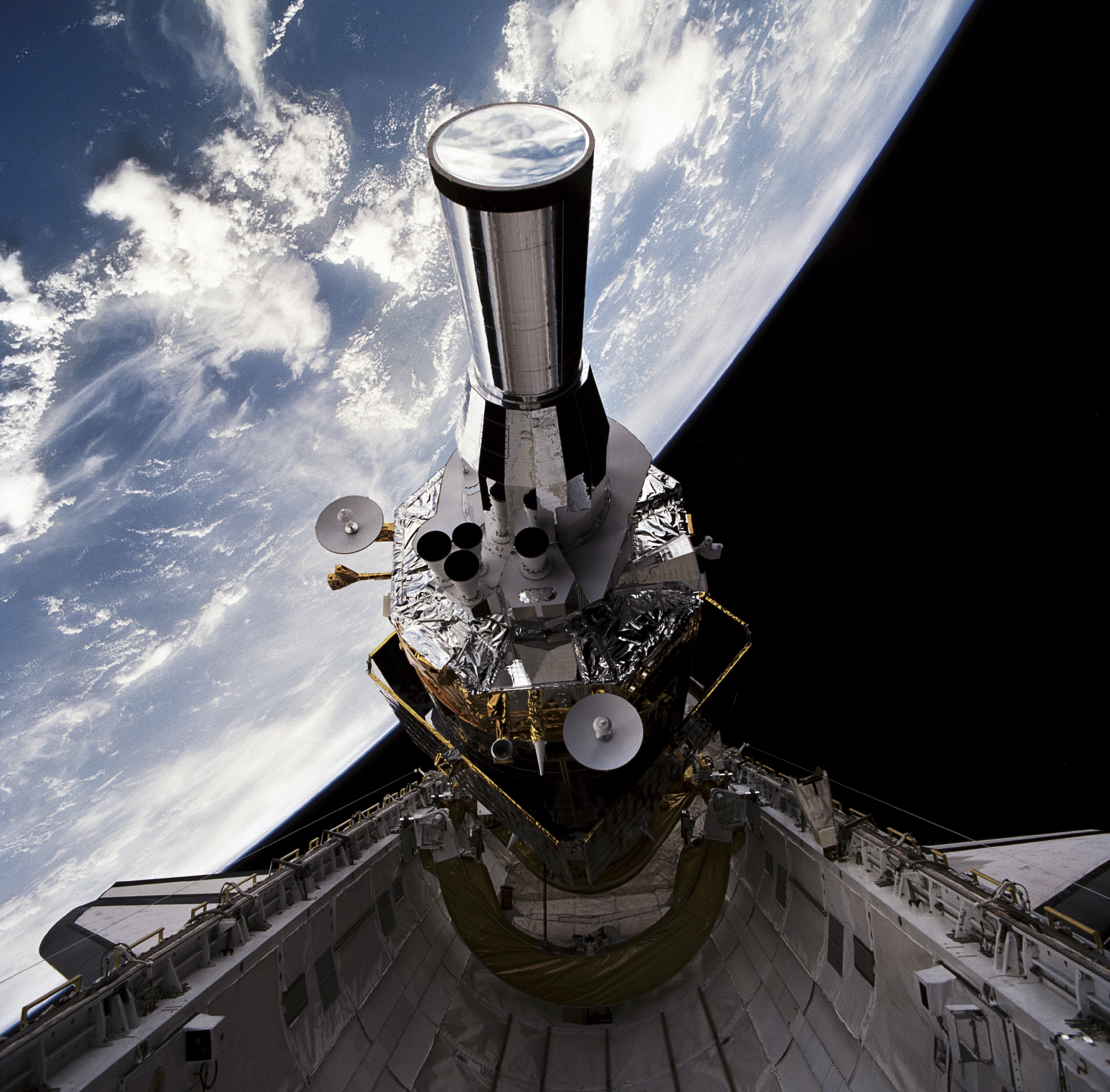
Deployment of a Defense Support Program missile warning spacecraft from the Space Shuttle Atlantis on the STS-44 mission

The Space Force's Space Delta 4 uses orbital spacecraft and ground-based radars to conduct theater and strategic missile warnings for the United States and its international partners.

This includes the network of Upgraded Early Warning Radars at Beale Air Force Base, Clear Space Force Station, Cape Cod Space Force Station, Pituffik Space Base, and RAF Fylingdales, alongside the AN/FPQ-16 PARCS radar at Cavalier Space Force Station.

Currently, the Space Force is working with the Missile Defense Agency to acquire the Long Range Discrimination Radar at Clear Space Force Station in Alaska.These ground-based radars also contribute to the Space Surveillance Network.

Space-based missile warning systems include the Defense Support Program and Space-Based Infrared System (SIBRS) spacecraft, which use infrared sensors to conduct missile defense and missile warning. SIBRS also has a battle space awareness and technical intelligence mission.

The Defense Support Program spacecraft are also capable of detecting nuclear detonations, in addition to space and missile launches.

==== Global Positioning System and military satellite communications ====
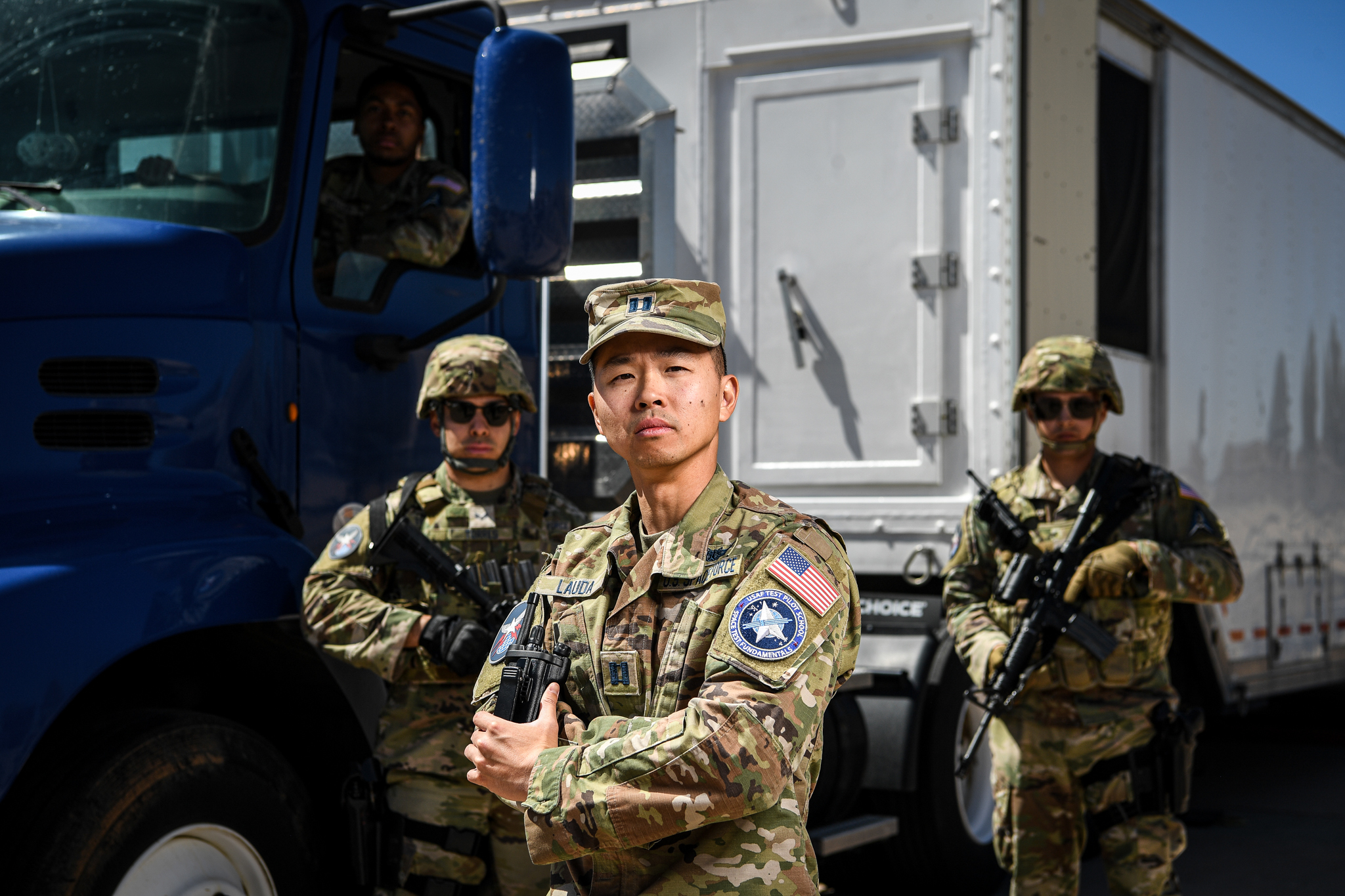
Members of the 4th Space Operations Squadron Mobile Operations Flight conducting armed convoy operations

The Space Force's Space Delta 8 is the operator of the Global Positioning System and the military's array of communications spacecraft.

The Global Positioning System is operated by the 2nd Space Operations Squadron, providing positioning, navigation, and timing information for civilian and military users across the entire world.

The Space Force's GPS system has become an integral element of the global information infrastructure, being used in virtually all sectors of the economy, including agriculture, aviation, marine transportation, surveying and mapping, and transit navigation. Its timing signal is used to synchronize global communication systems, electrical power grids, and financial networks.

The Global Positioning System also has a secondary mission of carrying nuclear detonation detection sensors.

Military satellite communication systems include the Fleet Satellite Communications System, UHF Follow-On satellite, and Mobile User Objective System, operated by the 10th Space Operations Squadron and inherited from the U.S. Navy.

The payloads on the Wideband Global SATCOM and Defense Satellite Communications System are operated by the 53rd Space Operations Squadron, a role inherited from the U.S. Army.

Finally, spacecraft operations for the Wideband Global SATCOM and Defense Satellite Communications System are conducted by the 4th Space Operations Squadron, in addition to the Milstar and Advanced Extremely High Frequency satellites, which both additionally support command and control of strategic nuclear forces.

==== Space launch ====
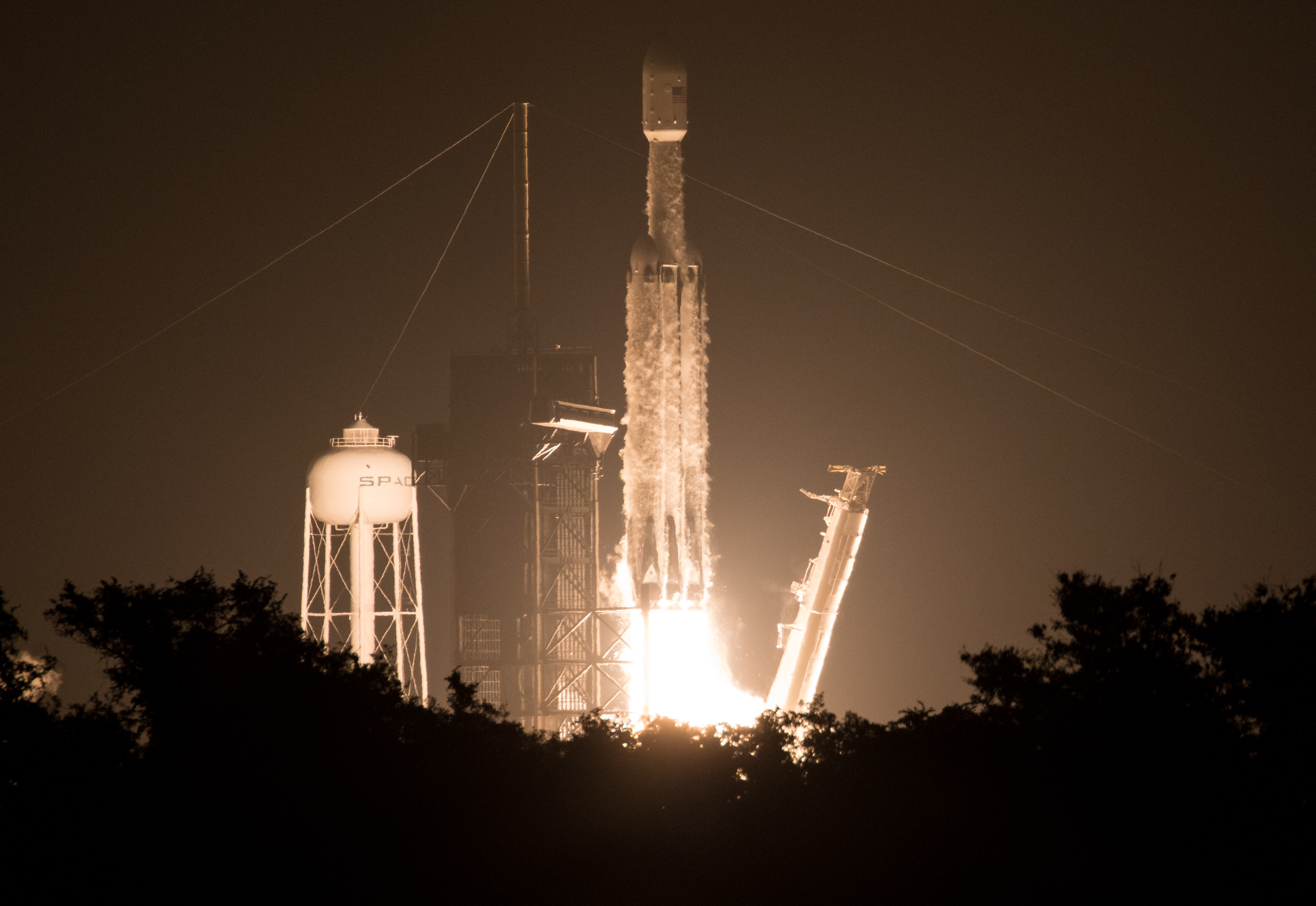
Launch of the Falcon Heavy on the STP-2 mission

The Space Force's space launch enterprise is organized under Space Systems Command, with Space Launch Delta 30 managing the Western Range from Vandenberg Space Force Base and Space Launch Delta 45 managing the Eastern Range from Cape Canaveral Space Force Station.

The Space Force does not just manage military space launches, but also supports NASA and commercial space launches.

Major space launch vehicles flown or scheduled to fly off of Space Force launch ranges include NASA's Space Launch System, SpaceX's Starship, Falcon Heavy, and Falcon 9, and United Launch Alliance's Vulcan, which will replace the Atlas V and Delta IV Heavy.

Currently, vehicles for the National Security Space Launch program include the Vulcan, Atlas V, Falcon Heavy, and Falcon 9 rockets.

An experimental Air Force Research Laboratory vanguard program that the Space Force leads, Rocket Cargo, is exploring using rockets to supplement naval and air transport to rapidly deliver supplies to forces across the Earth. The SpaceX Starship rocket is one such system currently being explored.

==== Space Force commands ====
The Space Force is organized into three field commands and multiple component field commands, which serve as joint force space component commands for the unified combatant commands.

Name	Mission	Headquarters
Headquarters Space Force (HSF)	Space Force service headquarters led by the chief of space operations.	The Pentagon, Virginia
Field commands
Space Force Combat Forces Command (CFC)	Generates, presents, and sustains space warfighting capability for combatant commanders	Peterson SFB, Colorado
Space Systems Command (SSC)	Develops, acquires, equips, fields, and sustains lethal and resilient space capabilities	Los Angeles AFB, California
Space Training and Readiness Command (STARCOM)	Increases Guardians' readiness to prevail in competition and conflict through education, training, doctrine, and test	Peterson SFB, Colorado
Component field commands
U.S. Space Forces – Space (SPACEFOR–SPACE)	The U.S. Space Force component to U.S. Space Command which plans, executes, and integrates military spacepower into multi-domain global operations for all U.S. military operations beginning at the Kármán line, 62 miles/100 kilometers above mean sea level	Vandenberg SFB, California
U.S. Space Forces - Special Operations Command (SPACEFOR-SOC)	The U.S. Space Force component to the United States Special Operations Command which generates, prepares, and presents specialized Space Force personnel and force packages to U.S. Special Operations Command to integrate space capabilities into special operations.	MacDill Air Force Base, Florida
U.S. Space Forces – Central (SPACEFOR–CENT)	The U.S. Space Force component to U.S. Central Command which plans, executes, and integrates military power across an area of responsibility that spans Northeast Africa, the Middle East, and Central and South Asia	MacDill AFB, Florida
U.S. Space Forces – Europe and Africa (SPACEFOR–EURAF)	The U.S. Space Force component to U.S. European Command and U.S. Africa Command which plans, executes, and integrates military spacepower across an area of responsibility that spans Europe, large portions of Asia, the Middle East, Arctic Ocean, and Atlantic Ocean and Africa	Ramstein AB, Germany
U.S. Space Forces – Indo-Pacific (SPAFOR-INDOPAC)	The U.S. Space Force component to U.S. Indo-Pacific Command which plans, executes, and integrates military spacepower across an area of responsibility that spans the Asia-Pacific region	JB Pearl Harbor-Hickam, Hawaii
U.S. Space Forces Southern (SPACEFOR–SOUTH)	The U.S. Space Force component to U.S. Southern Command responsible for integrating space power with joint, interagency and multinational partners to support regional security, deterrence and stability across Central America, South America and the Caribbean.	Davis-Monthan Air Force Base, Arizona
U.S. Space Forces Northern (SPACEFOR-NORTH)	The U.S. Space Force component to U.S. Northern Command responsible for incorporating continental defense, multi-domain awareness; missile warning and tracking; global positioning, navigation, and timing; and orbital and electromagnetic warfare.	Peterson Space Force Base, Colorado
Space Force Element
Space Force Element National Reconnaissance Office (SFELM NRO)	Supports the design, development, launch, and maintenance of America's intelligence satellites	Chantilly, Virginia

=== U.S. Coast Guard ===
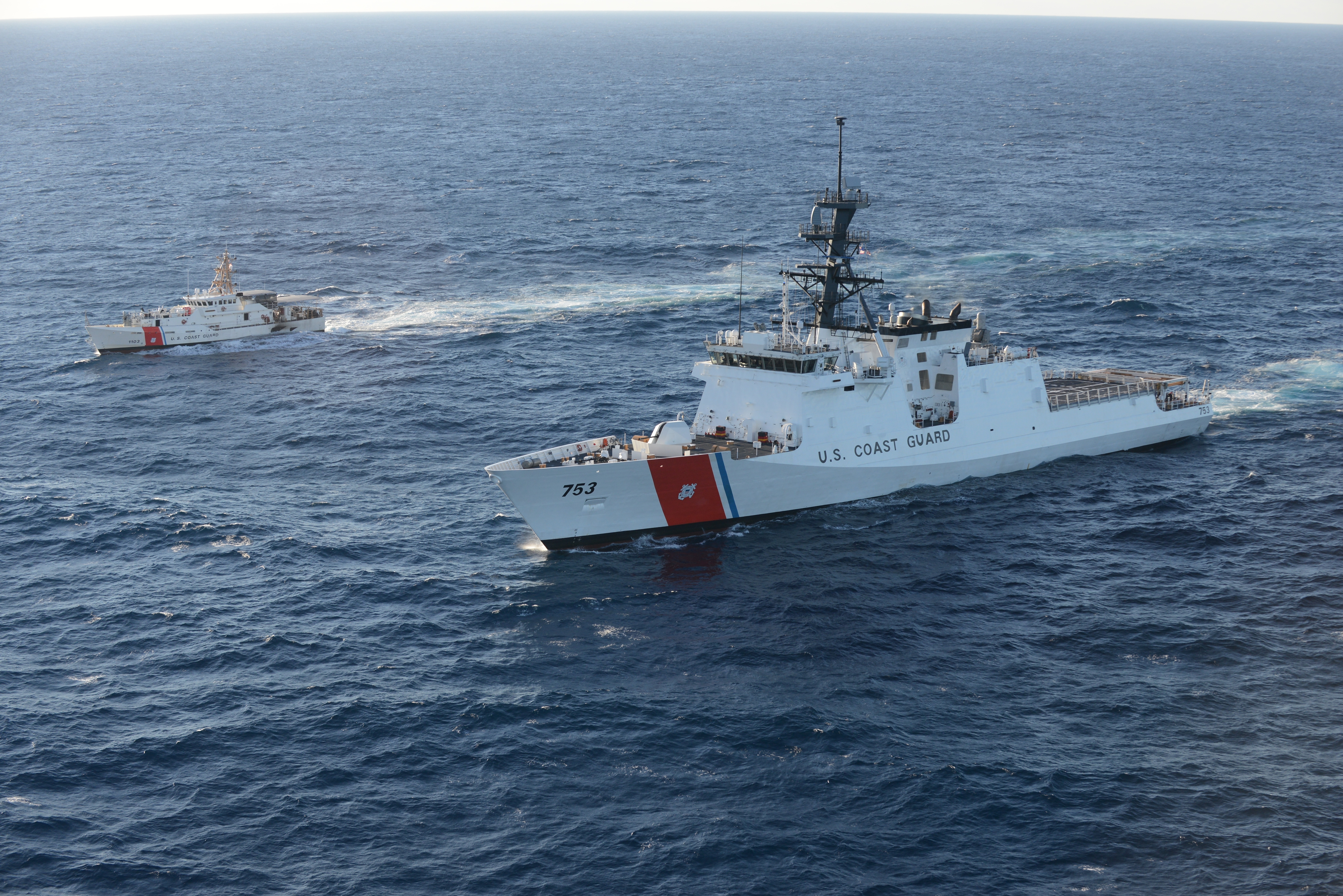
USCGC Hamilton (WMSL-753) sailing alongside the USCGC William Flores (WPC-1103)

The United States Coast Guard (USCG) is the United States Armed Forces' maritime security, maritime search and rescue, and maritime law enforcement force. It was first established in 1790 as the United States Revenue-Marine and consists of the Regular Coast Guard and the Coast Guard Reserve.

Although it has always been one of the six military branches, the Coast Guard is organized under the Department of Homeland Security under the leadership of the secretary of Homeland Security and the deputy secretary of Homeland Security.

During times of war, the U.S. Coast Guard can be transferred to the Department of the Navy

The Coast Guard itself is led by the commandant of the Coast Guard and vice commandant of the Coast Guard, both admirals advised by the master chief petty officer of the Coast Guard.

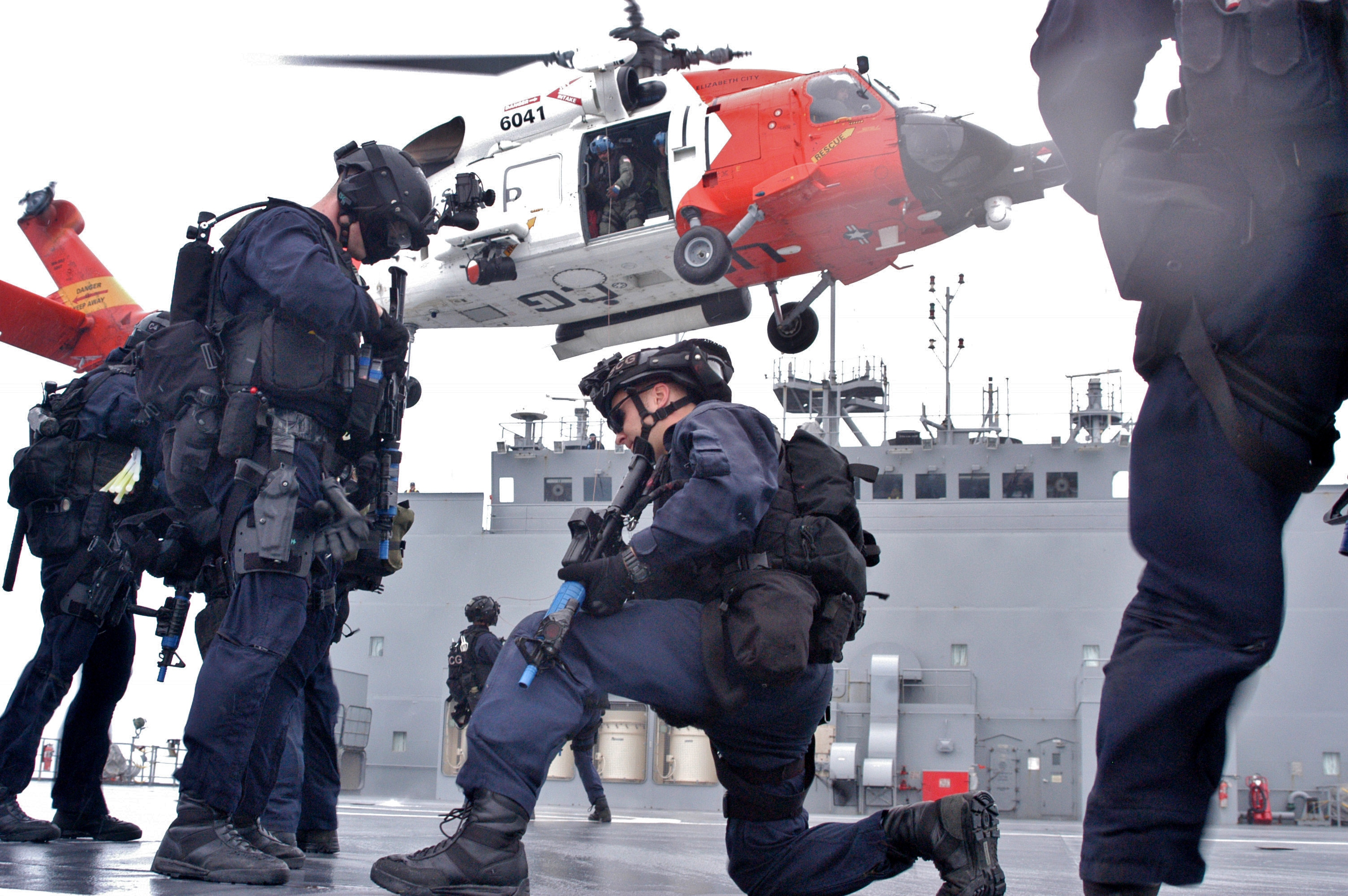
A Coast Guard Maritime Security Response team executing a boarding action from an MH-60 Jayhawk helicopter

The Coast Guard has six major operational mission programs, through which it executes its 11 statutory missions:

- Maritime law enforcement
- Maritime response
- Maritime prevention
- Maritime transport system management
- Maritime security operations
- Defense operations

Maritime law enforcement operations focus on protecting the United States maritime borders and assuring its maritime sovereignty.

The Coast Guard conducts operations to suppress violations of U.S. law at sea, including counter-illegal migration and transnational organized crime operations. Codified missions executed under the maritime law enforcement program include drug interdiction, migrant interdiction, living marine resources, and other law enforcement.

Maritime response operations see the Coast Guard conducting search-and-rescue operations and rescuing mariners responding to maritime disasters. Codified missions include search and rescue and marine environmental protection (response activities).

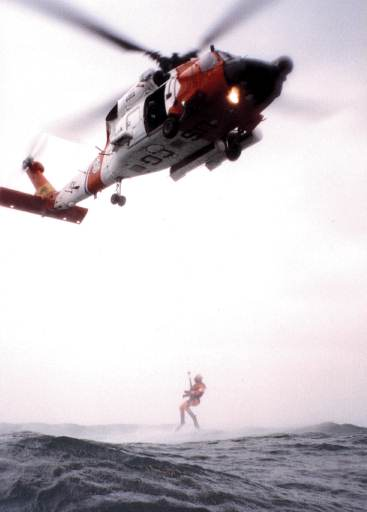
Coast Guard aviation MH-60 Jayhawk helicopter with a rescue swimmer

Maritime prevention operations prevent marine casualties and property losses, minimize security risks, and protect the marine environment.

The Coast Guard does so by developing and enforcing federal regulations, conducting safety and security inspections, and analyzing port security risk assessments. Codified missions include ports, waterways, and coastal security, marine safety, and marine environmental protection (protection activities).

Maritime transport system management ensures a safe, secure, and environmentally sound waterways system. Codified missions include maintaining aids to navigation and ice operations.

Maritime security operations include activities to detect, deter, prevent, and disrupt terrorist attacks, and other criminal acts in the U.S. maritime domain. This includes the execution of anti-terrorism, response, and select recovery operations.

This mission performs the operational element of the Coast Guard's Ports, Waterways, and Coastal Security mission and complements its Maritime Response and Prevention efforts. Codified missions include ports, waterways, and coastal security (response activities).

Coast Guard Defense Operations deploy the Coast Guard globally under the Department of Defense's unified combatant commands, where it operates under the joint force maritime component commands. Codified missions include defense readiness.

==== Coast Guard commands ====
The U.S. Coast Guard is organized into two area commands that cover the entire globe.

Name	Mission	Headquarters
Coast Guard Headquarters (USCG HQ)	Coast Guard service headquarters led by the commandant of the Coast Guard.	Douglas A. Munro Coast Guard Headquarters Building, Washington D.C.
Operating forces
Coast Guard Atlantic Area (LANTAREA)	Conducts Coast Guard operations east of the Rocky Mountains, to include the Atlantic Ocean, Caribbean, Europe, Africa, and the Middle East.	Coast Guard Station Portsmouth, Virginia
Coast Guard Pacific Area (PACAREA)	Conducts Coast Guard operations west of the Rocky Mountains, to include the Indo-Pacific region.	Coast Guard Base Alameda, California
Coast Guard Cyber Command (CGCYBER)	Conducts Coast Guard cyber operations and collaborates with United States Cyber Command.	Washington D.C.
U.S. Coast Guard Reserve (USCGR)	Oversees and maintains Coast Guard reserve forces.	Douglas A. Munro Coast Guard Headquarters Building, Washington D.C.

== Modernization and budget ==
The US military has undertaken a number of iniatives recently to modernize and restructure, some going back to 2022.

In September 2026, modernization initiatives announced included:

- Autonomous Warfare Command — a new four-star command to scale AI, drones, and unmanned/robotic systems across the US military
- FORTRESS America — Federal Operations for Resilience, Troop Resources, Energy, Supply, and Survivability: make U.S. installations independent of public utilities, generate their own power, and harden bases/supply chains against cyber, sabotage, and drones.
- Project Meridian — a future-warfare group of officials, academics, and private-sector tech leaders to identify domains and weapons decades out, with first findings due in 120 days. Industry participants include Palmer Lucky and Elon Musk.

=== Budget ===
The United States manages the world's largest military budget, followed by the People's Republic of China, India, United Kingdom, and Russia.

The James M. Inhofe National Defense Authorization Act for Fiscal Year 2023 established the topline defense budget as $857.9 billion, with the Department of Defense receiving $816.7 billion and the Department of Energy's national security programs receiving $30.3 billion, an 8% increase from Fiscal Year 2022.

The Department of the Air Force budget, unlike the Department of the Army or Department of the Navy has a sizable portion of "pass-through." This is money not controlled or used by the Air Force, but is instead passed to other Department of Defense agencies and can be up to 17% of the department's budget. This pass-through allocation gives the impression that the Air Force is the highest funded military department. It is actually the least funded.

Defense budget by account (FY23)
Account	U.S. dollars (billions)
Procurement	163
Research, Development, Test, & Evaluation	139
Operations & Maintenance	279
Military Personnel & Health	210
Military Construction	19
Defense-related Nuclear Programs	30

Defense budget by military service (FY24)
Service	U.S. dollars (billions)
Army	185.5
Marine Corps	53.2
Navy	202.6
Air Force	185.1
Space Force	30
Coast Guard	13.45
Defense-wide	141.3

=== Army modernization ===
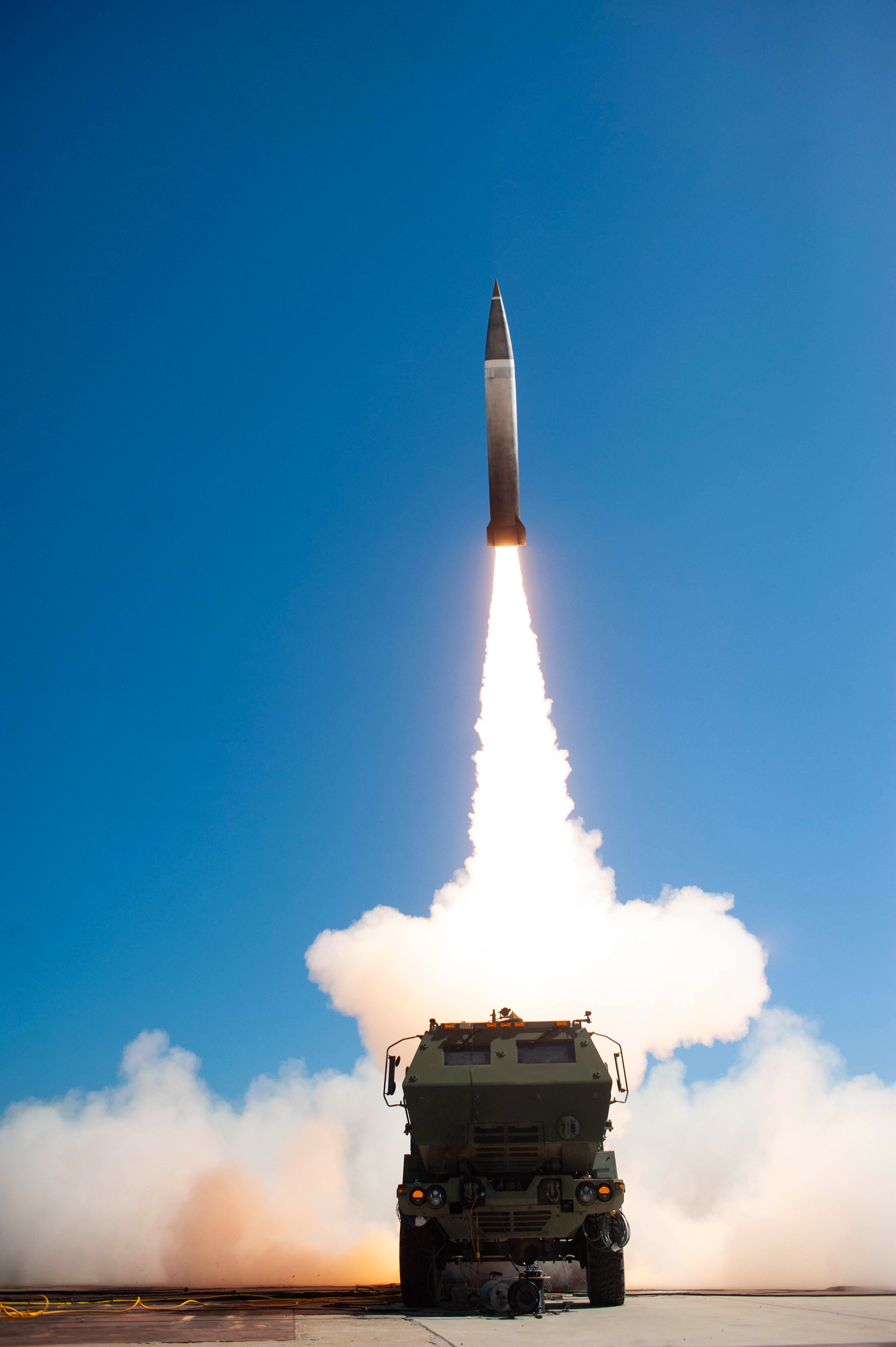
Launch of Precision Strike Missile from a M142 HIMARS at Vandenberg Space Force Base

The Army's modernization efforts, led by United States Army Transformation and Training Command, are centralized into six priorities. Each priority is led by a Cross Functional Team.

Long Range Precision Fires is the land service's top modernization priority, focusing on rebuilding its Field Artillery Branch in response to longer range Russian and Chinese artillery systems.

The Extended Range Cannon Artillery program is developing a cannon artillery piece that can accurately fire at targets 70 kilometers away, an increase from the 30 kilometer distance of current cannon artillery.

The Precision Strike Missile is a surface-to-surface guided missile intended to be fired from the current M270 Multiple Launch Rocket System and M142 HIMARS, replacing their current missiles and doubling the rate of fire.

The Army is also working with the Missile Defense Agency, U.S. Navy, and U.S. Air Force to develop a common hypersonic glide body, which the Army will employ as part of the mobile ground launched Long-Range Hypersonic Weapon program.

Finally, the Army is working to modify the U.S. Navy's RIM-174 Standard ERAM and UGM-109 Tomahawk land attack cruise missile for ground launch to provide the Army with mid-range artillery capability.

The Next Generation Combat Vehicle program is developing a family of fighting vehicles for the Armor Branch to increase firepower, speed, and survivability.

The Optionally Manned Fighting Vehicle is intended to replace the M2 Bradley, while the Armored Multi-Purpose Vehicle will replace the M113 armored personnel carriers, which have been used since the Vietnam War.

The three variants of the Armored Multi-Purpose Vehicle are general purpose, mission command, and medical treatment. The Mobile Protected Firepower is designed to be a light tank for Infantry Brigade Combat Teams.

Finally, the Robotic Combat Vehicles are intended to come in light, medium, and heavy variants that will serve as scouts and escorts for crewed combat vehicles.

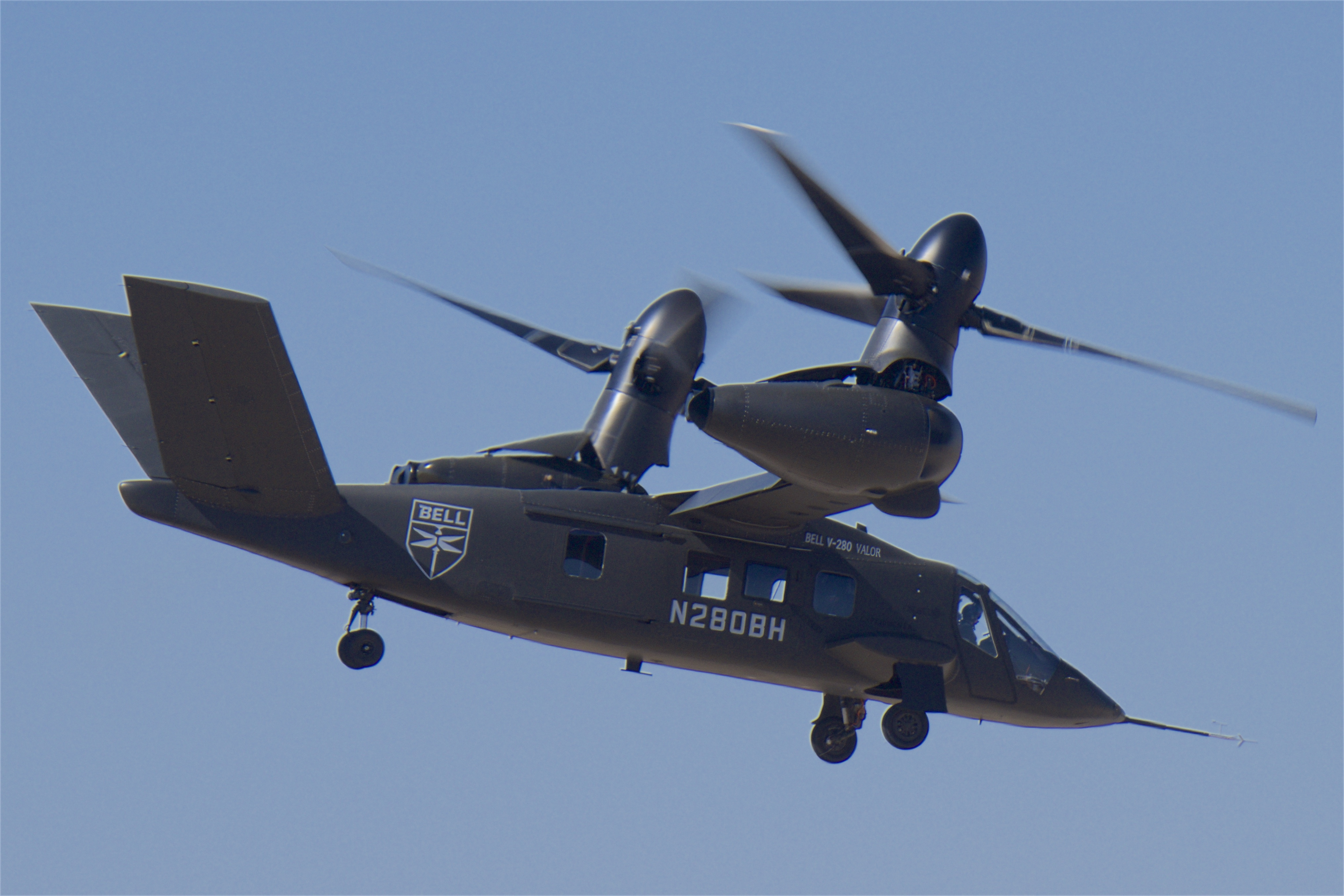
The V-280 Valor flying in tiltrotor configuration

The Future Vertical Lift program is intended to replace the current helicopter fleet flown by the Army Aviation Branch.

The Future Long-Range Assault Aircraft is intended to replace the UH-60 Black Hawk and the Marine Corps UH-1Y Venom, with the Army selecting the Bell V-280 Valor tiltrotor aircraft as the winner.

The Future Attack Reconnaissance Aircraft is intended to replace the AH-64 Apache in the attack and reconnaissance roles.

The Army is working to modernize its communication networks for the Army Signal Corps, including developing a Unified Network consisting of an integrated tactical network, an integrated enterprise network, and unified network-enabling capabilities.

Other sub-efforts include developing a common operating environment, ensuring the network is interoperable with the other services and allied countries, and increasing the mobility and reducing the signature of its command posts.

Efforts also include modernizing Global Positioning System technology to provide assured positioning, navigation, and timing, and working with the United States Intelligence Community and commercial space companies to increase the Army's access to space-based intelligence, surveillance, and reconnaissance capabilities.

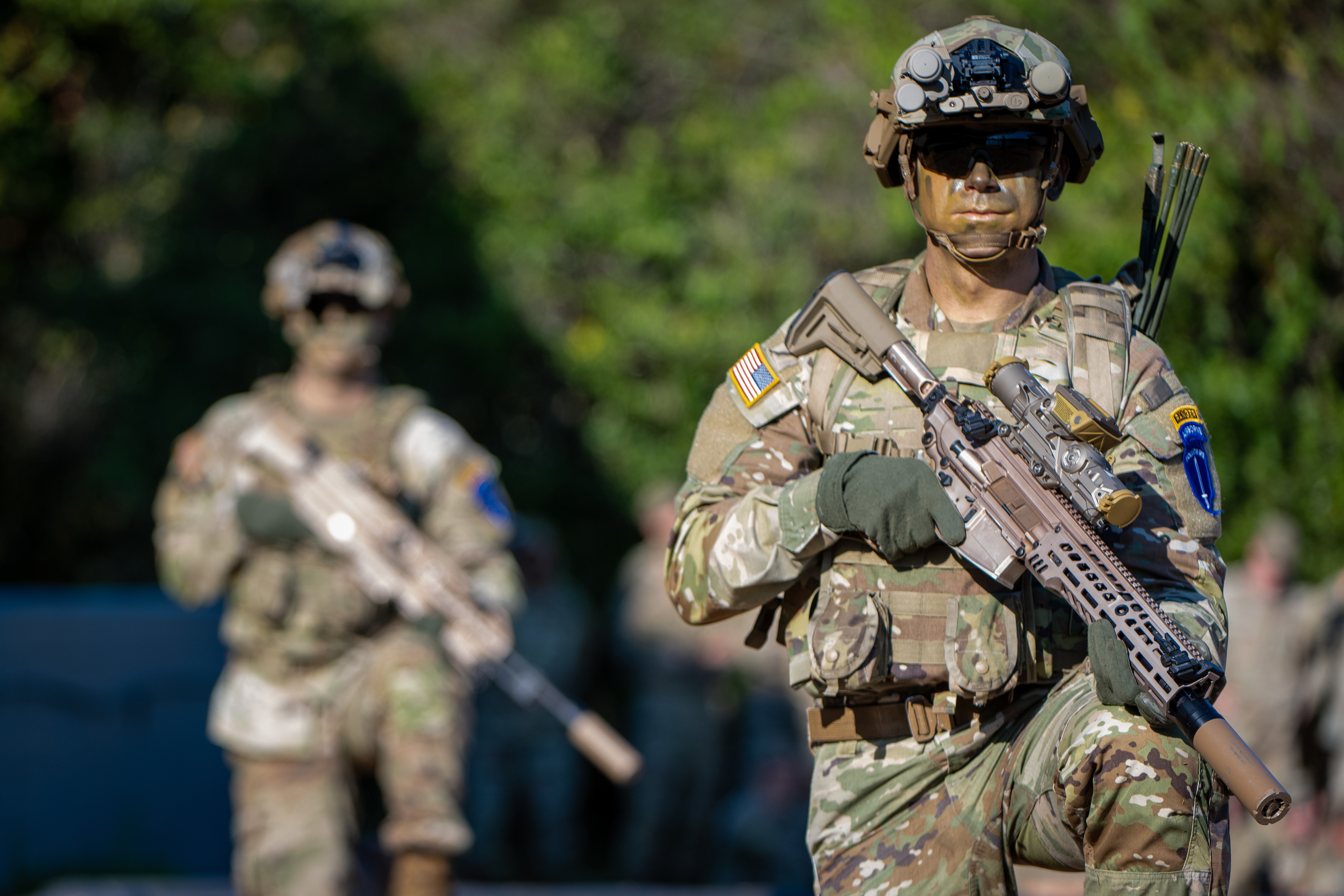
Army Rangers armed with the XM7 rifle and XM250 light machine gun

Recognizing that the United States is unlikely to have uncontested air superiority, the Army is undergoing a mass revitalization of its air and missile defense enterprise through the Air Defense Artillery Branch.

The first layer of defense is the Ballistic Low-Altitude Drone Engagement, which will be mounted on the Common Remotely Operated Weapon Station and is designed to engage small unmanned aerial vehicles.

The second layer is the Multi-Mission High Energy Laser, which will intercept small drones and munitions.

The third and fourth layers comprise the Maneuver Air Defense Technology and Next-Generation Fires Radar, which will be integrated into short range air defense systems.

The fifth layer puts a High-Energy Laser Tactical Vehicle Demonstrator onto a Medium Tactical Vehicle.

While the sixth layer encompasses the Low-Cost Extended-Range Air Defense to supplement the MIM-104 Patriot missiles.

Finally, the Army is looking to improve the equipment of its soldiers in the Infantry Branch with the Next Generation Squad Weapon, the Integrated Visual Augmentation System, and the Synthetic Training Environment. In 2022, the Army selected the SIG Sauer's XM7 rifle and XM250 light machine gun to replace the M4 carbine and the M249 light machine gun through the Next Generation Squad Weapon program.

=== Marine Corps modernization ===
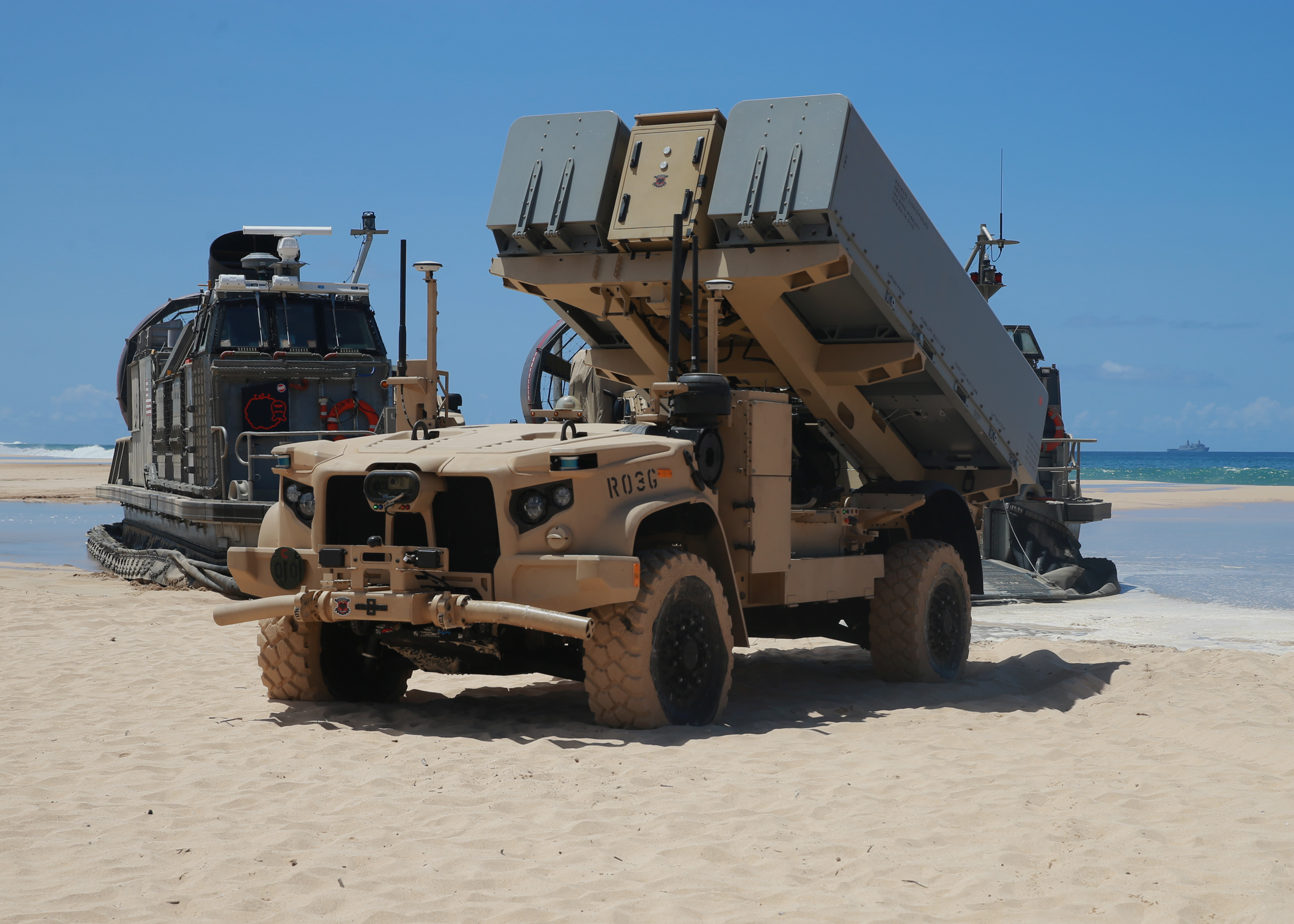
A Naval Strike Missile launcher on the Joint Light Tactical Vehicle

The Marine Corps modernization is being executed under the aegis of Force Design 2030, which is intended to return the service to its naval and amphibious roots serving as a "stand-in" force within contested areas of the maritime littorals.

As part of this effort, the Marine Corps has begun establishing naval-focused Marine Littoral Regiments, consisting of a Littoral Combat Team, Littoral Anti-Air Battalion, and a Combat Logistics Battalion. The Littoral Combat Team is organized around an infantry battalion with an anti-ship missile battery, focused on conducting sea denial operations in support of the Navy.

The Marine Corps is in the process of acquiring the Amphibious Combat Vehicle, which is slated to replace the aging Assault Amphibious Vehicle. The Amphibious Combat Vehicle is intended to support the Marines during amphibious assaults and once they have reached shore.

The Marine Corps has also adopted the Naval Strike Missile which is fielded from a modified Joint Light Tactical Vehicle as part of the Marines' artillery battalions. The concept is that small mobile units of Marines would move around different islands and shorelines with these weapons to fire on adversary ships.

Marine Corps aviation is also in the process of acquiring the CH-53K King Stallion helicopter for heavy lift, replacing the current CH-53E Super Stallion in the role.

The Marine Corps is also looking to replace its UH-1Y Venom helicopters through the Future Vertical Lift program and is in the process of acquiring a significant number of unmanned aerial vehicles, such as the MQ-9 Reaper.

=== Navy modernization ===
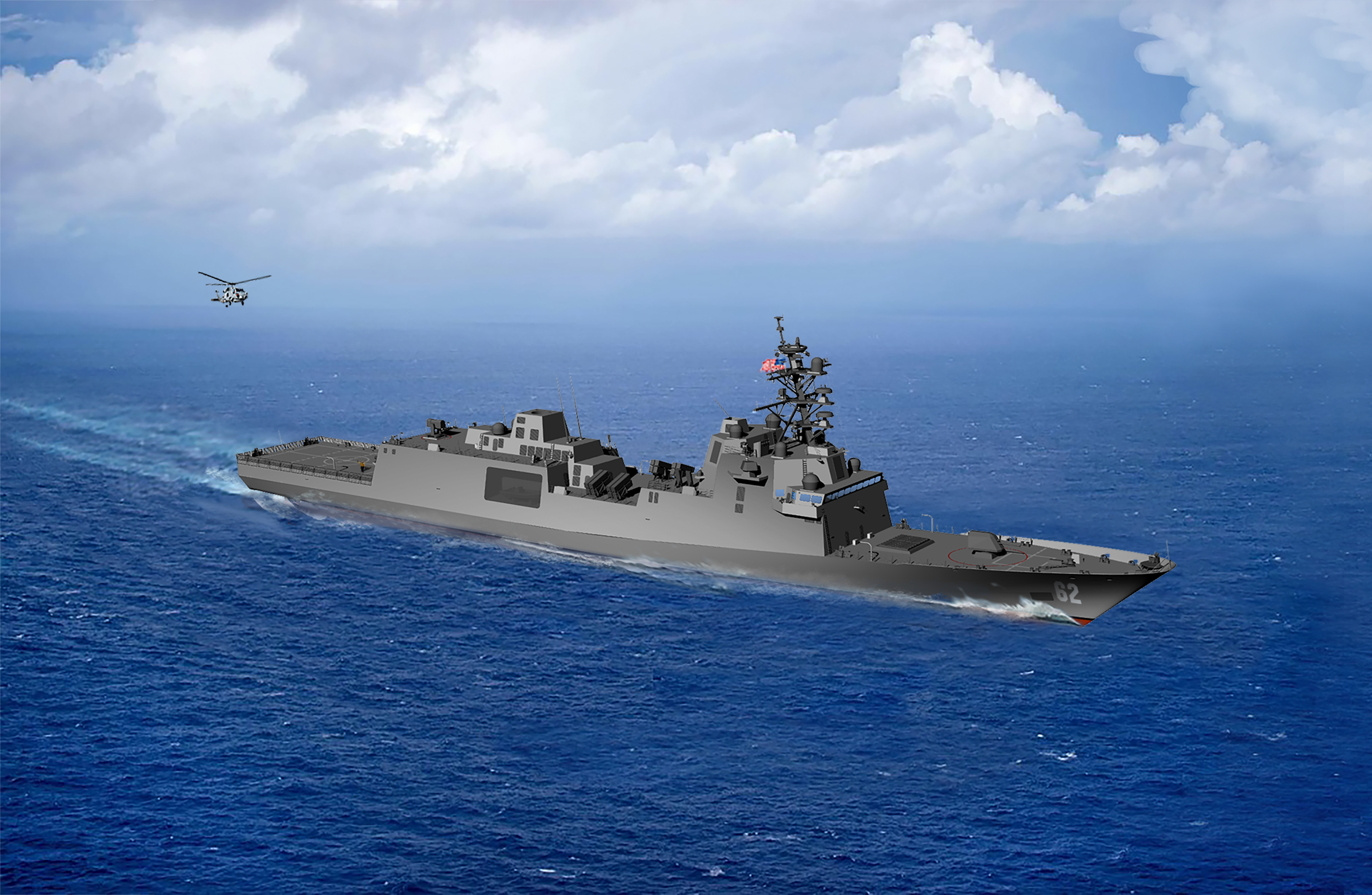
Rendering of USS Constellation (FFG-62)

Like the Marine Corps, the Navy is in the process of overhauling and modernizing its fleet with a renewed focus. While the Navy is continuing to purchase Arleigh Burke-class destroyers, it is embarking on the DDG(X) program of guided missile destroyers to replace them and the Ticonderoga-class cruisers. The DDG(X) will include directed energy weapons and potentially hypersonic weapons.

The Constellation-class frigates will be the first frigates in the U.S. Navy since the Oliver Hazard Perry-class frigates were retired. The Constellation-class frigates are based on the Italian FREMM multipurpose frigates and will replace the littoral combat ships.

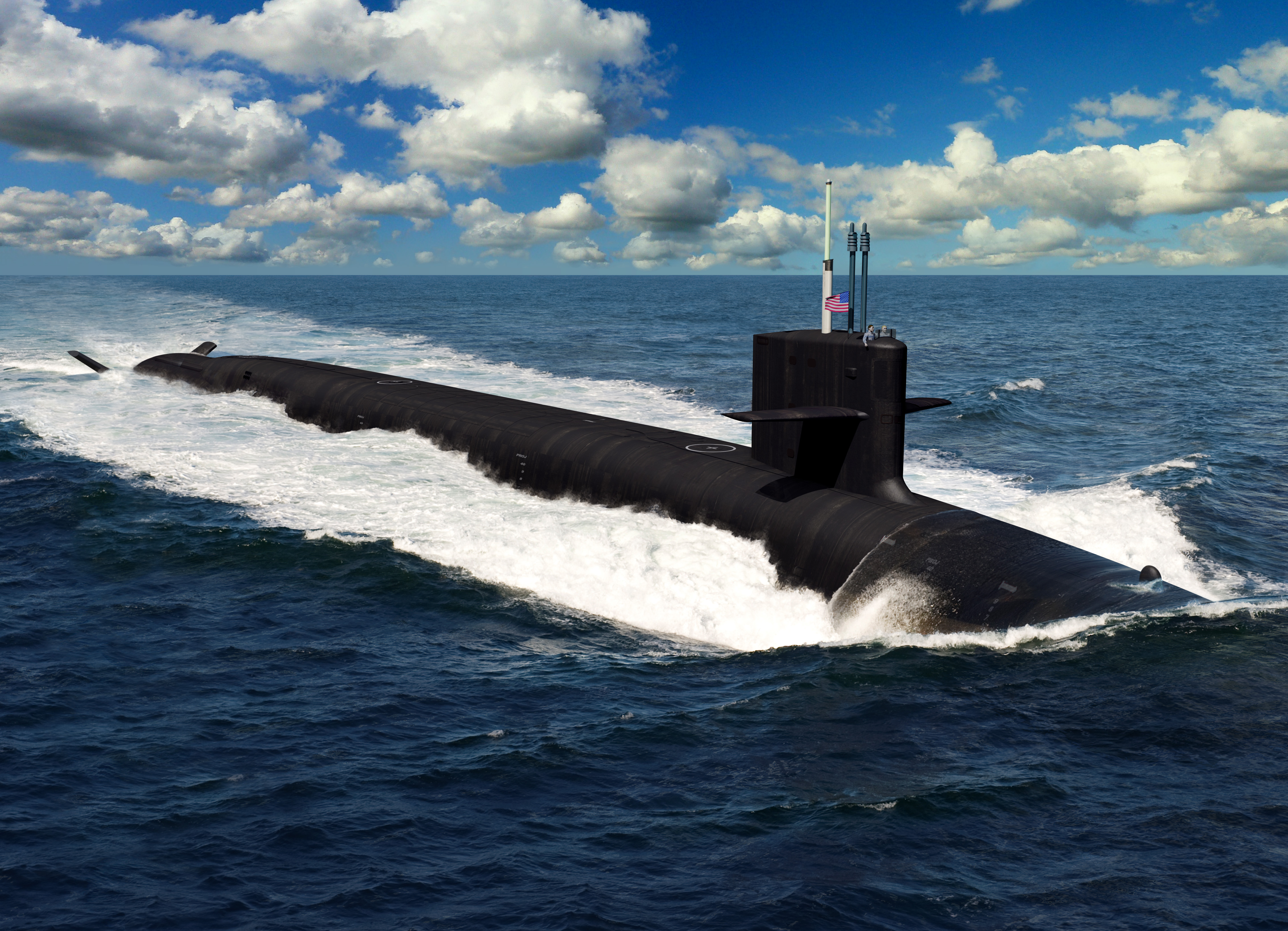
Rendering of a Columbia-class ballistic missile submarine

The Navy is starting development on the SSN(X) attack submarines, intended to replace the Virginia-class and Seawolf-class submarines.

The Columbia-class submarines will begin replacing the Ohio-class ballistic missile submarines. The acquisition of the Columbia-class submarines is the first priority of the Navy.

With Naval Aviation, the service is continuing to procure additional Gerald R. Ford-class aircraft carriers and F-35C Lightning II stealth fighters.

Ultimately, the F/A-XX program is intended to produce a sixth-generation fighter to replace the legacy F/A-18E/F Super Hornets as part of the Carrier Air Wing and is using the Future Vertical Lift program to replace its fleet of SH-60 Seahawk helicopters.

The service is also investing heavily in unmanned platforms, such as unmanned surface vehicles, using the Ghost Fleet Overlord to test the concept.

It is also fielding unmanned aerial vehicles, such as the land-based MQ-4C Triton for maritime patrol and the carrier-based MQ-25A Stingray for aerial refueling, replacing the F/A-18F in the role.

=== Air Force modernization ===
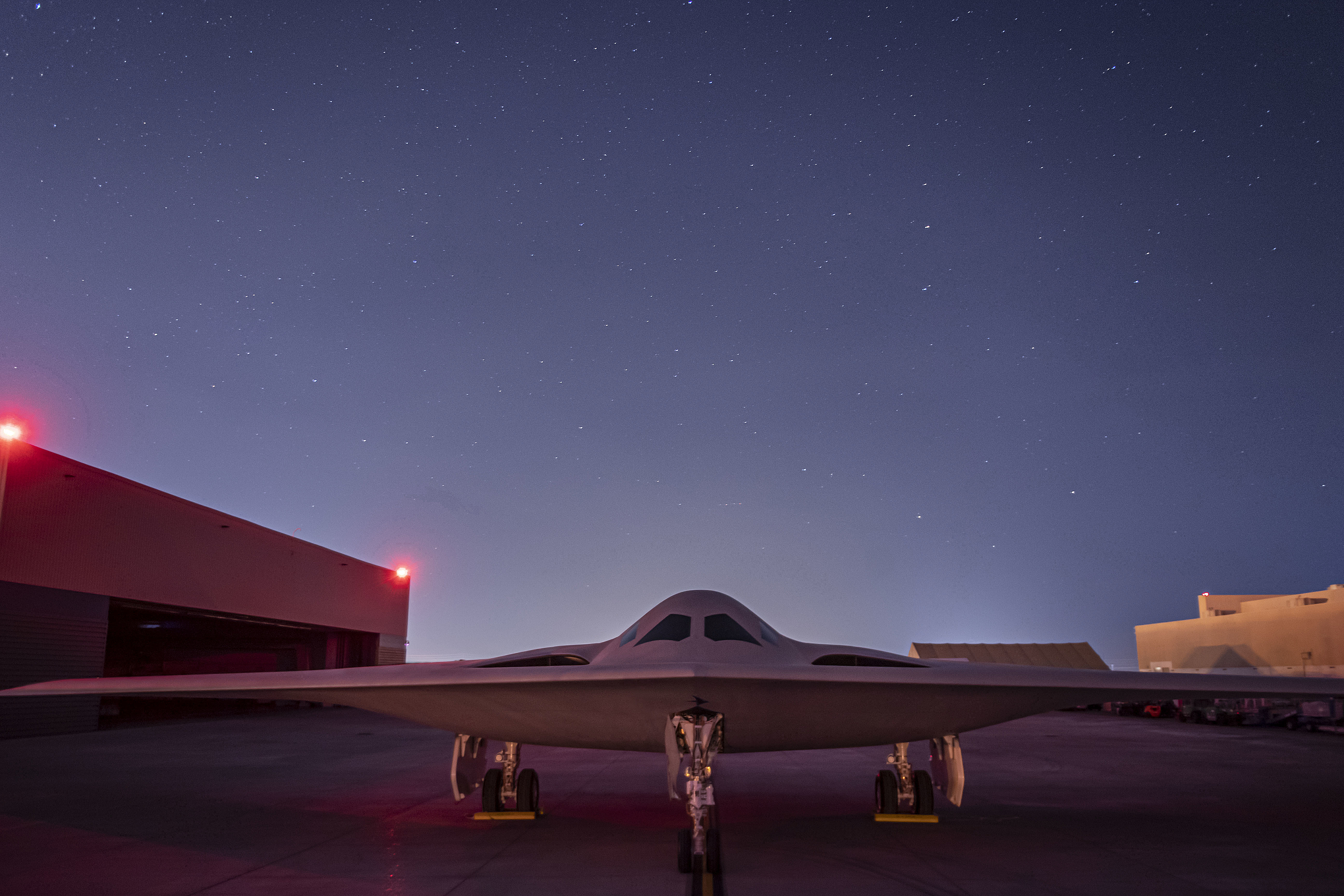
B-21 Raider at United States Air Force Plant 42

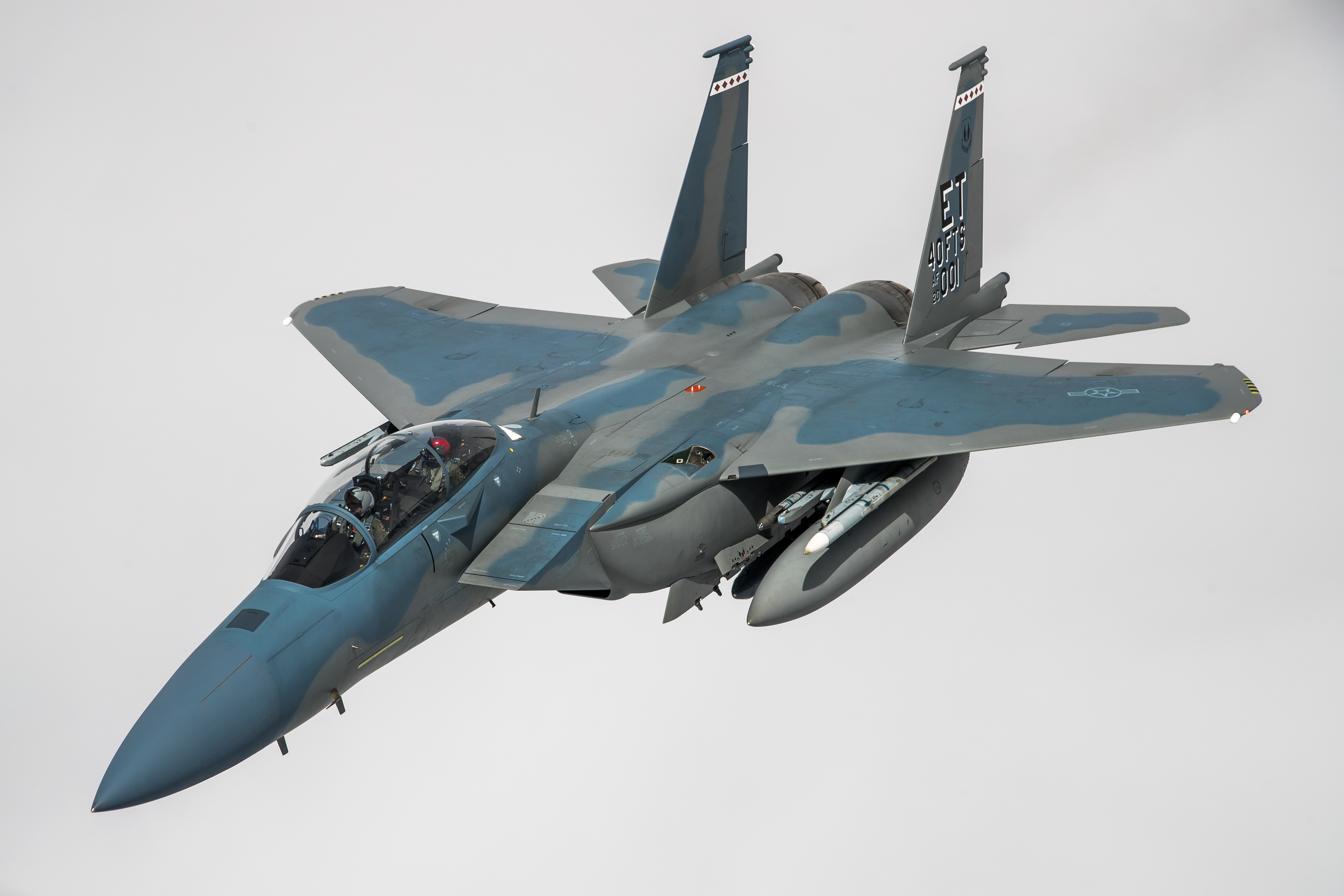
F-15EX Eagle II from the 40th Flight Test Squadron

The B-21 Raider stealth bomber is the first new Air Force bomber since the B-2A Spirit. The B-21 will replace the B-2 and the B-1B Lancer, flying alongside the B-52 Stratofortress. The development of the B-21 Raider was led by the Department of the Air Force Rapid Capabilities Office.

The service is also developing the LGM-35 Sentinel intercontinental ballistic missile to replace the LGM-30G Minuteman IIIs.

The U.S. Air Force is also in the process of developing the Next Generation Air Dominance program, which will produce a sixth generation fighter to replace the F-22 Raptor.

The service is also procuring the fourth generation F-15EX Eagle II to replace the aging F-15C Eagle and F-15E Strike Eagle.

It is procuring the T-7A Red Hawk trainer jet to replace the 1950s-era T-38 Talon.

While not an aircraft, the Air Force is investing in developing the AIM-260 Joint Advanced Tactical Missile to replace or supplement the AIM-120 AMRAAM for its fighter forces.

It is also procuring the AGM-181 Long Range Stand Off Weapon to replace the AGM-86 ALCM as a nuclear air-launched cruise missile for the B-21 Raider and the B-52 Stratofortress.

The air service is investing in hypersonic weapons, with the AGM-183 Air-Launched Rapid Response Weapon, the Hypersonic Air-breathing Weapon Concept, and the Hypersonic Attack Cruise Missile in development.

=== Space Force modernization ===
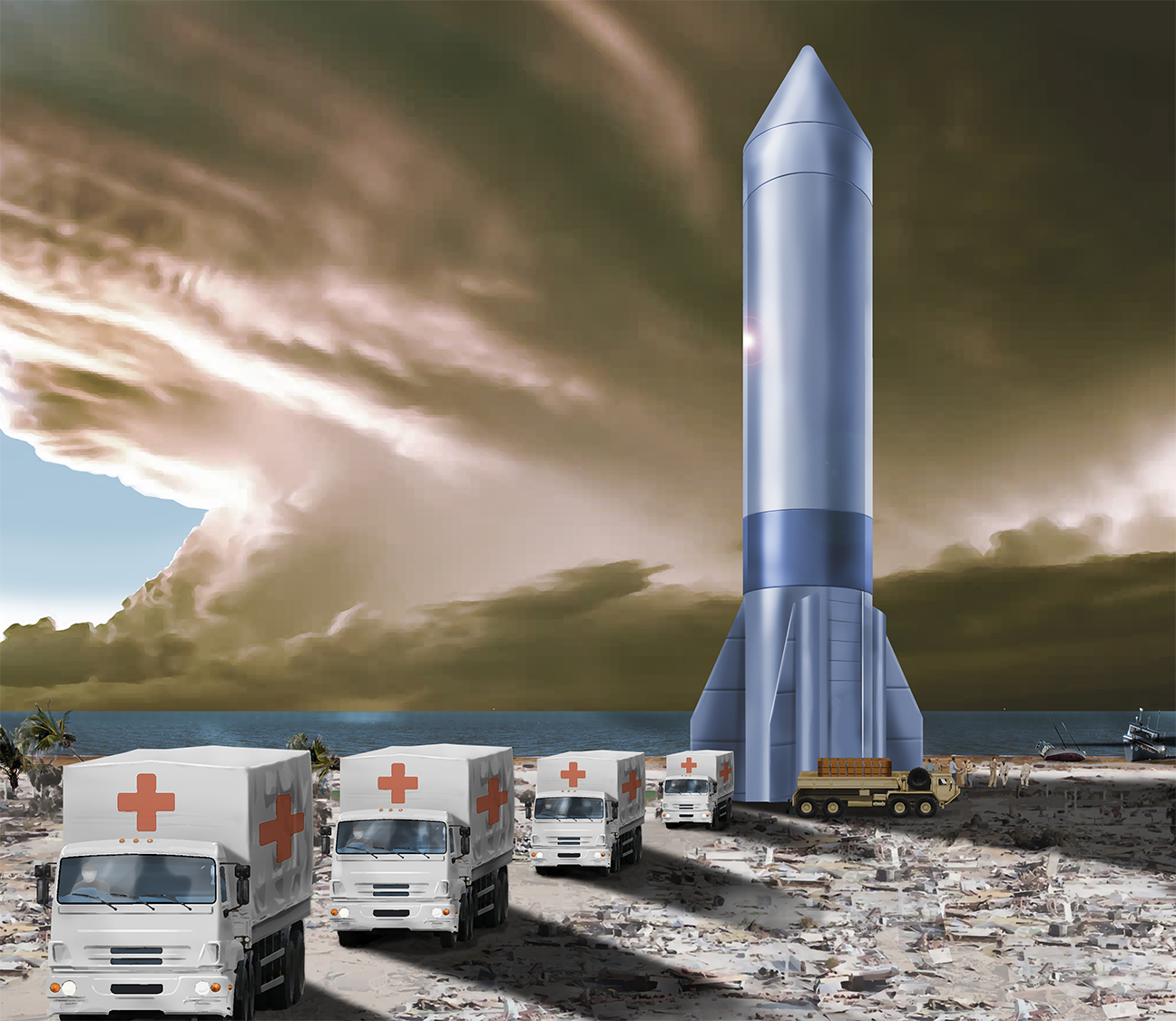
Concept for a Space Force Rocket Cargo program conducting humanitarian assistance and disaster relief operations

The U.S. Space Force is undergoing intensive modernization efforts. The Deep Space Advanced Radar Capability (DARC) is intended to track objects in geosynchronous orbit with three sites, one in the United States, one in the Indo-Pacific, and one in Europe.

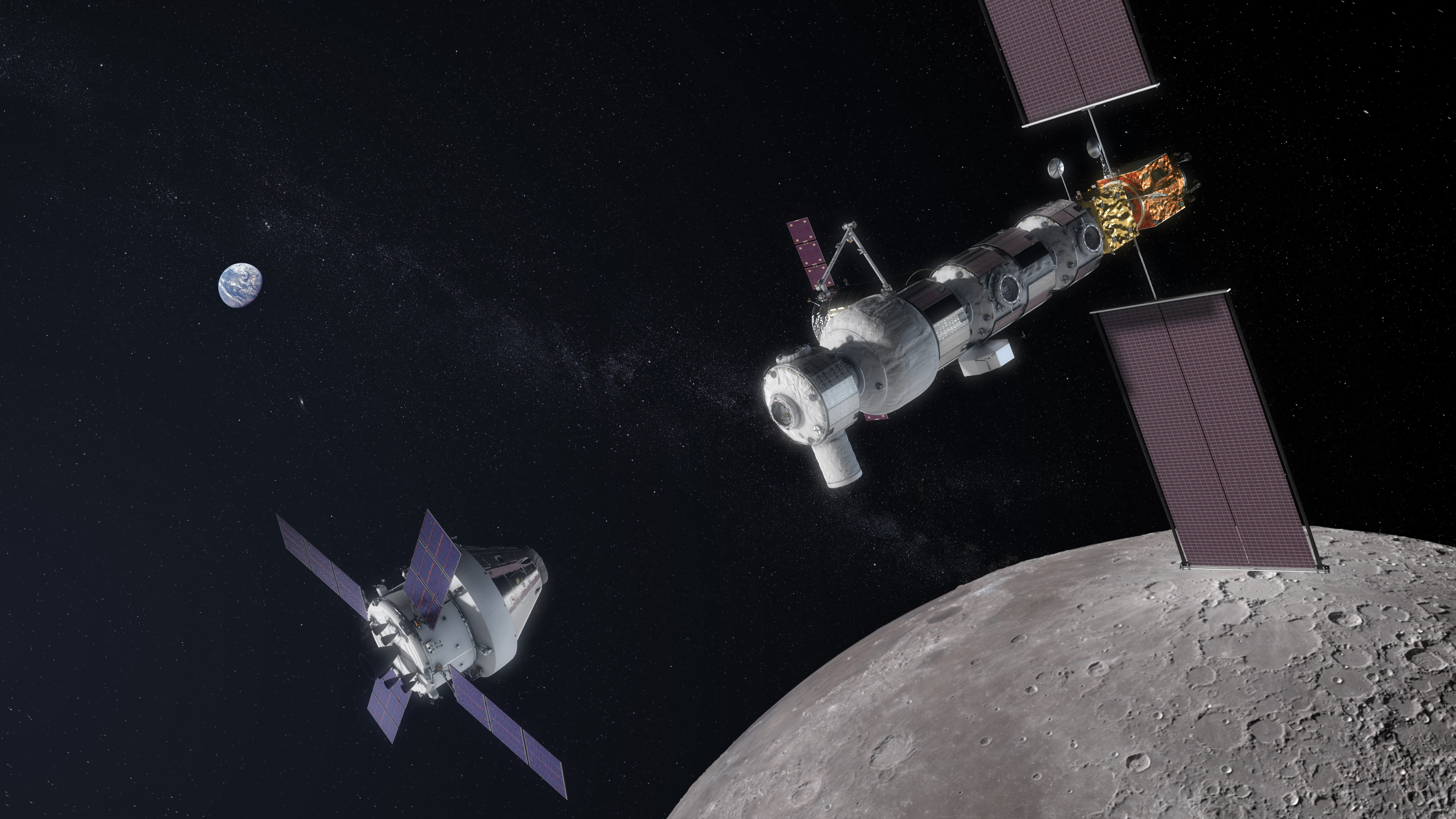
NASA's return to the Moon through the Artemis program is leading to a greater emphasis on cislunar domain awareness

Oracle, a spacecraft developed by the Air Force Research Laboratory for the Space Force, will demonstrate technologies that the space service needs for cislunar domain awareness – tracking objects outside of geosynchronous orbit and between Earth and the Moon.

The spacecraft itself will launch to an area of gravitational stability between the Earth and the Moon to conduct operations, using a wide-field sensor and a more sensitive narrow-field sensor to discover and maintain custody of objects operating in this region.

Oracle will directly support NASA's Artemis program as it returns to the Moon and track potentially hazardous near-Earth objects in support of planetary defense operations.

Also an Air Force Research Laboratory program for the Space Force, Arachne is the keystone experiment in the Space Solar Power Incremental Demonstrations and Research Project, which aims to prove and mature essential technologies for a prototype space-based solar power transmission system capable of powering a forward operating base.

Arachne will specifically demonstrate and mature technologies related to more efficient energy generation, radio frequency forming, and radio frequency beaming.

Current forward operation bases rely on significant logistics convoys to transport fuel for power – space-based solar power would move these supply lines to space, where they cannot be easily attacked.

Space Force provided space-based solar power may transition to civilian use in the same vein as GPS.

Other space-based power beaming demonstrations include the Space Power InfraRed Regulation and Analysis of Lifetime (SPIRRAL) and Space Power INcremental DepLoyable Experiment (SPINDLE) experiments.

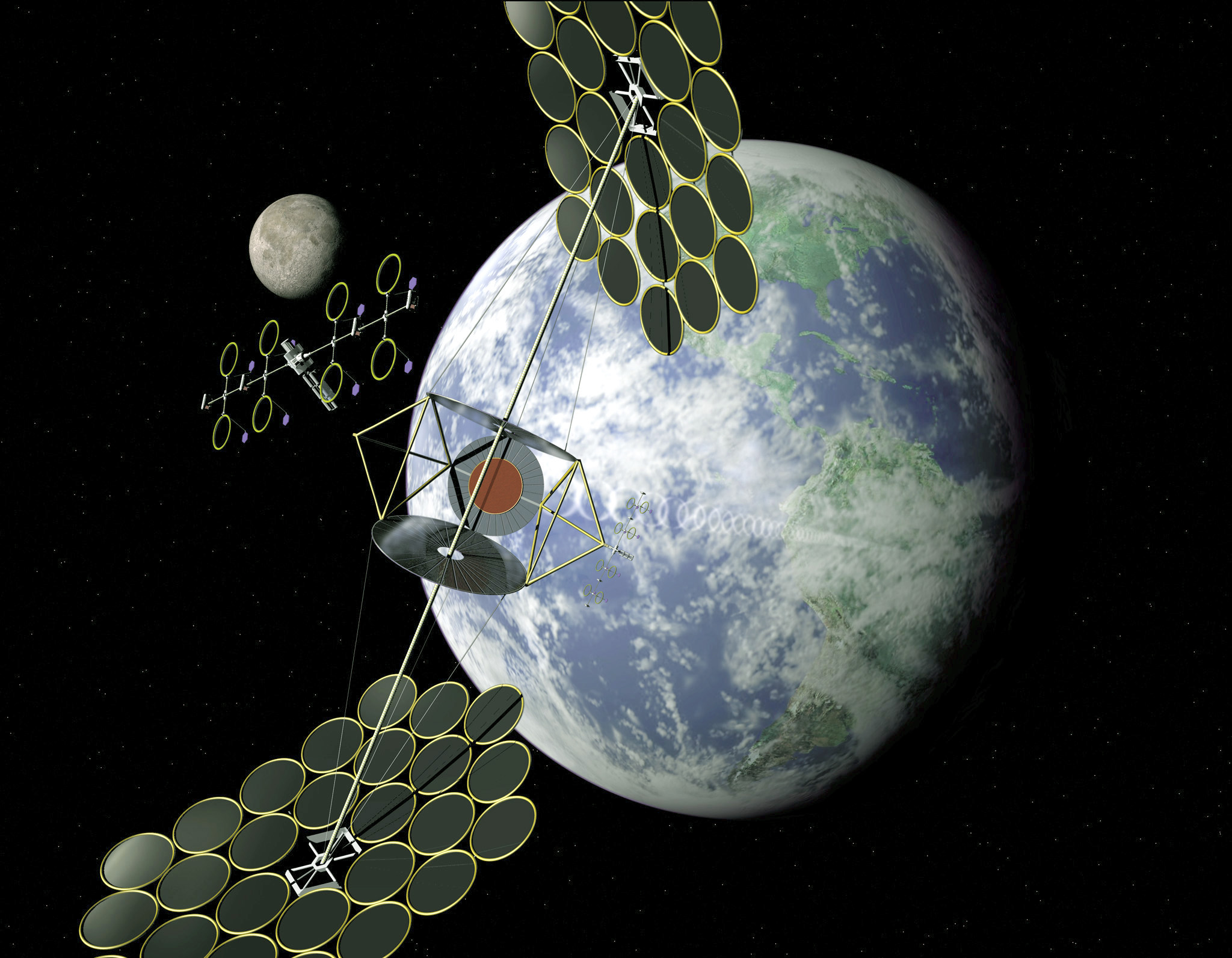
Concept for a space-based solar power spacecraft

The Navigation Technology Satellite-3 (NTS-3), building on the Space Force's Global Positioning System constellation, is an Air Force Research Laboratory spacecraft that will operate in geosynchronous orbit to test advanced techniques and technologies to detect and mitigate interference to positioning, navigation, and timing capabilities and increase system resiliency for military, civil, and commercial users. NTS-3 is a Vanguard program, described as aiming to deliver potentially game changing capabilities.

The Space Force's Rocket Cargo program is another Air Force Research Laboratory Vanguard program, focused on leasing space launch services to quickly transport military materiel to ports across the globe.

If proven viable, the Space Force's Space Systems Command will be responsible for transitioning it to a program of record.

United States Transportation Command would be the primary user of this capability, rapidly launching up to 100 tons of cargo anywhere in the world.

== Personnel ==
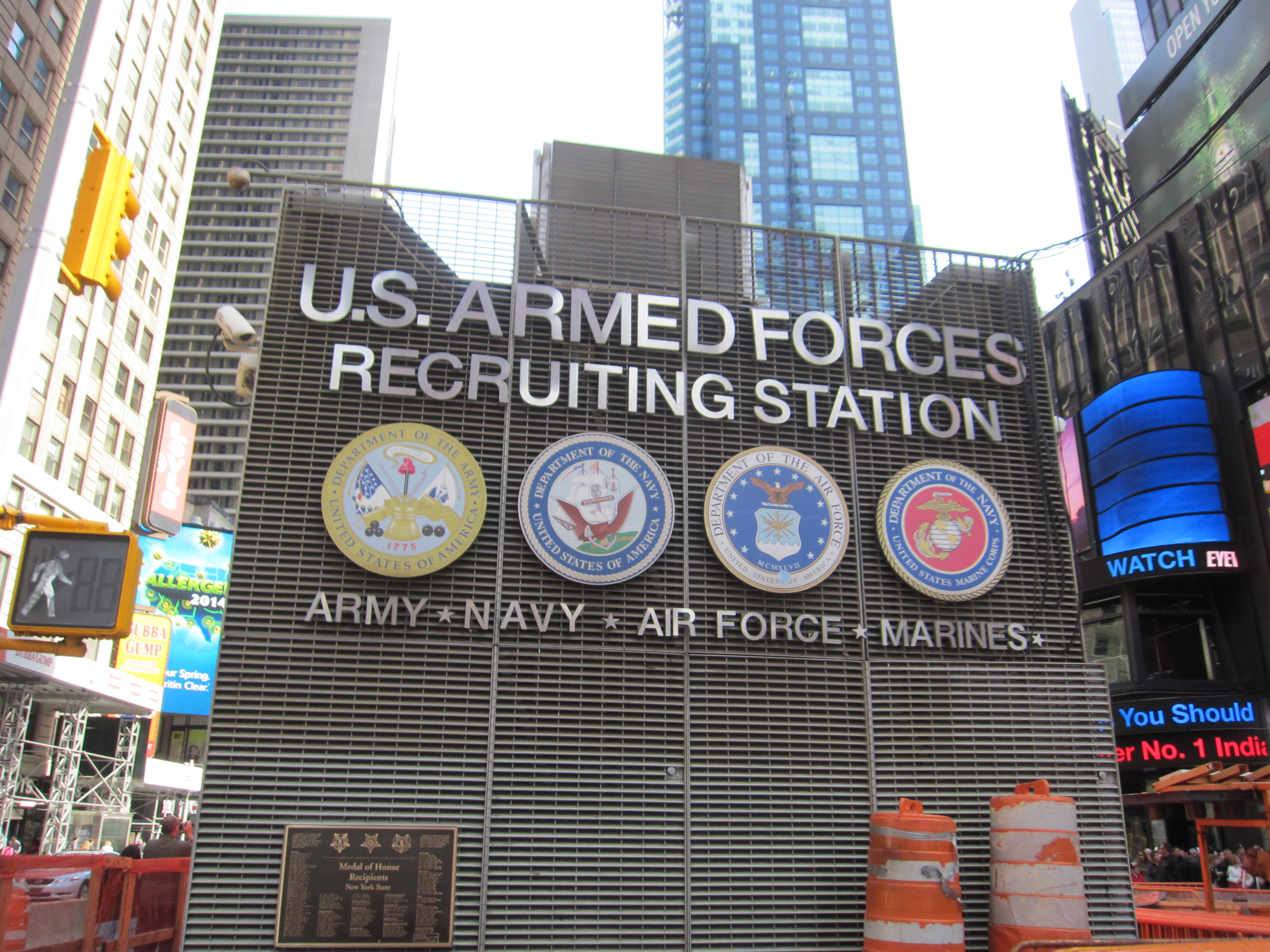
U.S. Armed Forces recruiting station at Times Square, New York City

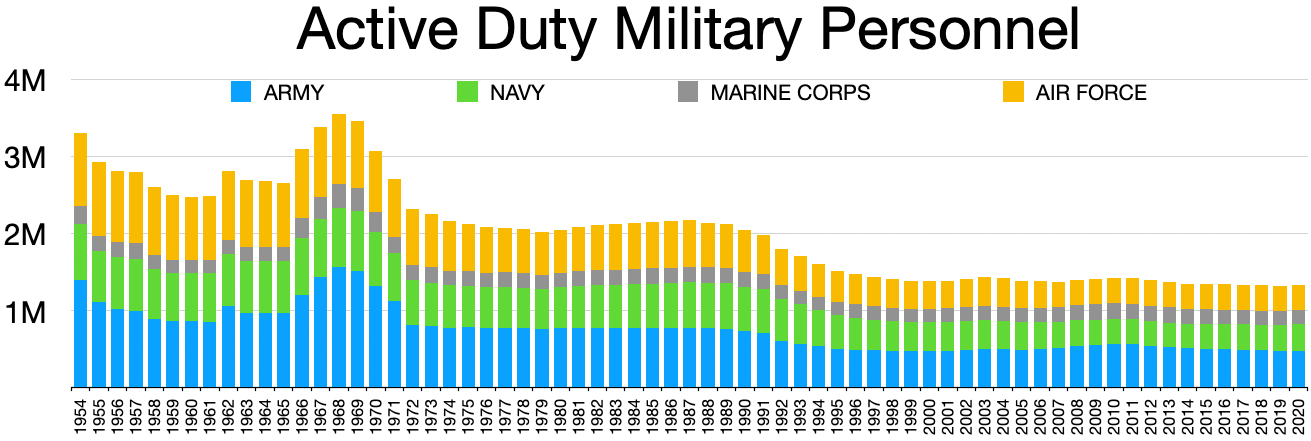
Active duty military personnel numbers Air Force and Space Force Marine Corps Navy Army

The U.S. Armed Forces is the world's third largest military by active personnel, after the Chinese People's Liberation Army and the Indian Armed Forces, consisting of 1,359,685 service members in the regular armed forces with an additional 799,845 service members in the reserves as of 28 February 2019.

While the United States Armed Forces is an all-volunteer military, conscription through the Selective Service System can be enacted at the president's request and Congress' approval, with all males ages 18 through 25 living in the United States required to register with the Selective Service.

Although the constitutionality of registering only males for Selective Service was challenged by federal district court in 2019, its legality was upheld by a federal appeals court in 2020.

As in most militaries, members of the U.S. Armed Forces hold a rank, either that of officer, warrant officer or enlisted, to determine seniority and eligibility for promotion. Those who have served are known as veterans.

Rank names may be different between services, but they are matched to each other by their corresponding pay grade.

Officers who hold the same rank or pay grade are distinguished by their date of rank to determine seniority. Officers who serve in certain positions of office of importance set by law, outrank all other officers on active duty of the same rank and pay grade, regardless of their date of rank.

=== Personnel by service ===
Total number of authorized personnel in FY26.

Component	Total	Active	Reserve	National Guard
U.S. Army	954,000	▲454,000	▼172,000	▲328,000
U.S. Marine Corps	▼205,900	▼172,300	▲33,600	
U.S. Navy	▼378,200	▼344,600	▲57,500	
U.S. Air Force	▼495,300	▼321,500	▼67,500	▼106,300
U.S. Space Force	▲10,400	▲10,400		
U.S. Coast Guard	50,200	41,700	8,500	
	2,094,000	1,344,500	339,100	434,300

=== Rank structure ===
Rank in the United States Armed Forces is split into three distinct categories: officers, warrant officers, and enlisted personnel.

Officers are the leadership of the military, holding commissions from the president of the United States and confirmed to their rank by the Senate.

Warrant officers hold a warrant from the secretaries of the military departments, serving as specialists in certain military technologies and capabilities. Upon promotion to chief warrant officer 2, they gain a commission from the president of the United States.

Enlisted personnel constitute the majority of the armed forces, serving as specialists and tactical-level leaders until they become senior non-commissioned officers or senior petty officers.

Military ranks across the services can be compared by U.S. Uniformed Services pay grade or NATO rank code.

==== Officer corps ====
NATO code	OF-10	OF-9	OF-8	OF-7	OF-6	OF-5	OF-4	OF-3	OF-2	OF-1
Uniformed services pay grade	Special grade	O-10	O-9	O-8	O-7	O-6	O-5	O-4	O-3	O-2	O-1
United States Army
United States Army	General of the Army	General	Lieutenant general	Major general	Brigadier general	Colonel	Lieutenant colonel	Major	Captain	First lieutenant	Second lieutenant
United States Marine Corps
United States Marine Corps		General	Lieutenant general	Major general	Brigadier general	Colonel	Lieutenant colonel	Major	Captain	First lieutenant	Second lieutenant
United States Navy
United States Navy	Fleet admiral	Admiral	Vice admiral	Rear admiral	Rear admiral (lower half)	Captain	Commander	Lieutenant commander	Lieutenant	Lieutenant (junior grade)	Ensign
United States Air Force
United States Air Force	General of the Air Force	General	Lieutenant general	Major general	Brigadier general	Colonel	Lieutenant colonel	Major	Captain	First lieutenant	Second lieutenant
United States Space Force
United States Space Force		General	Lieutenant general	Major general	Brigadier general	Colonel	Lieutenant colonel	Major	Captain	First lieutenant	Second lieutenant
United States Coast Guard
United States Coast Guard		Admiral	Vice admiral	Rear admiral	Rear admiral (lower half)	Captain	Commander	Lieutenant commander	Lieutenant	Lieutenant (junior grade)	Ensign
NATO code	OF-10	OF-9	OF-8	OF-7	OF-6	OF-5	OF-4	OF-3	OF-2	OF-1
Uniformed services pay grade	Special grade	O-10	O-9	O-8	O-7	O-6	O-5	O-4	O-3	O-2	O-1

Officers represent the top 18% of the armed forces, serving in leadership and command roles. Officers are divided into three categories:

- O-1 to O-3: Company grade officers in the Army, Marine Corps, Air Force, and Space Force or junior officers in the Navy and the Coast Guard.
- O-4 to O-6: Field grade officers in the Army, Marine Corps, Air Force, and Space Force or mid-grade officers in the Navy and Coast Guard.
- O-7 to O-10: General officers in the Army, Marine Corps, Air Force, and Space Force or flag officers in the Navy and Coast Guard.

Officers are typically commissioned as second lieutenants or ensigns with a bachelor's degree after several years of training and education or directly commissioned from civilian life into a specific specialty, such as a medical professional, lawyer, chaplain, or cyber specialist.

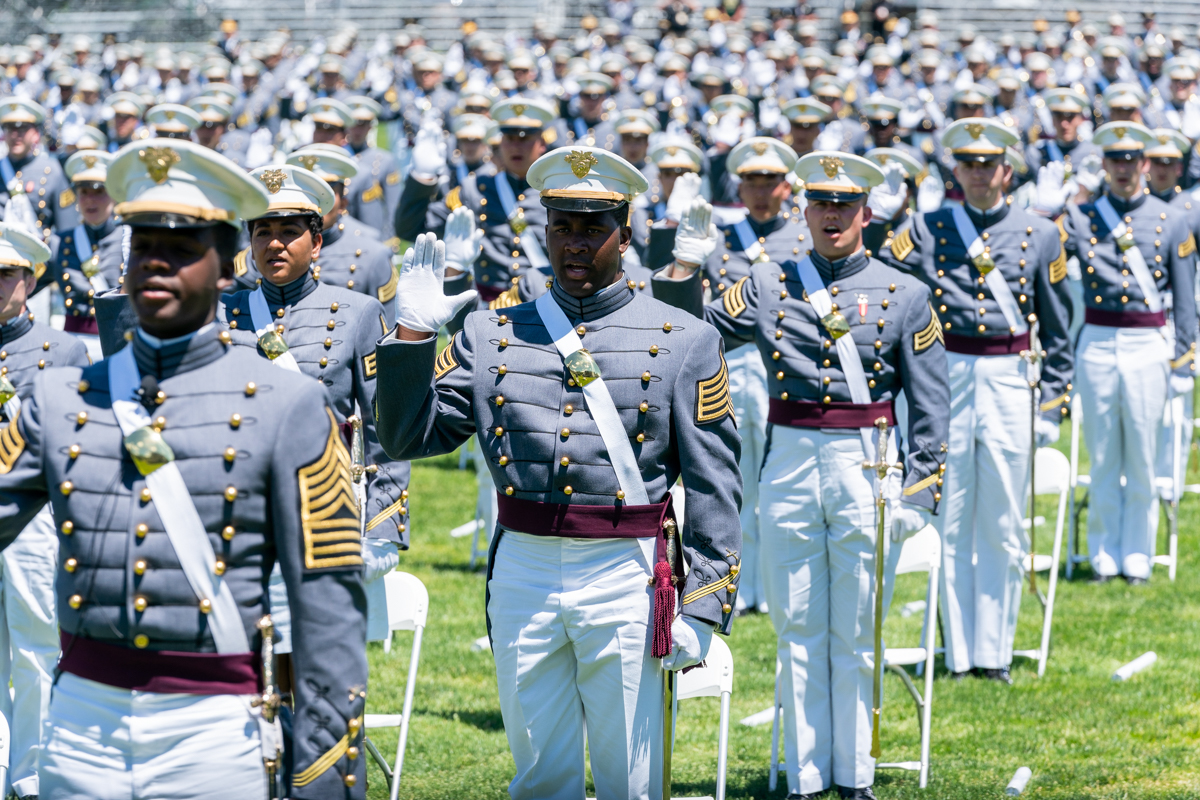
The United States Military Academy commissions officers into the United States Army.

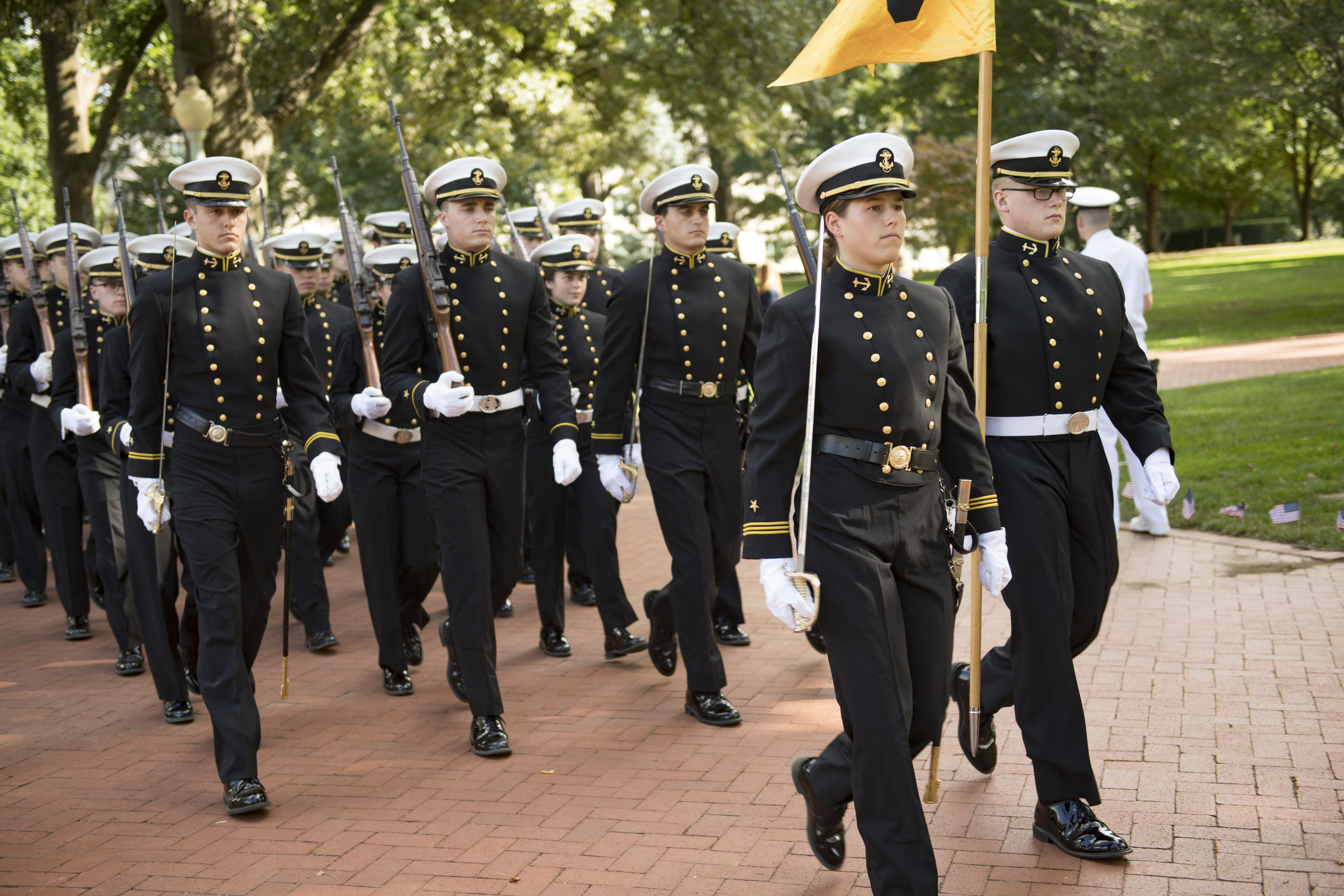
The United States Naval Academy commissions officers into the United States Marine Corps and United States Navy.

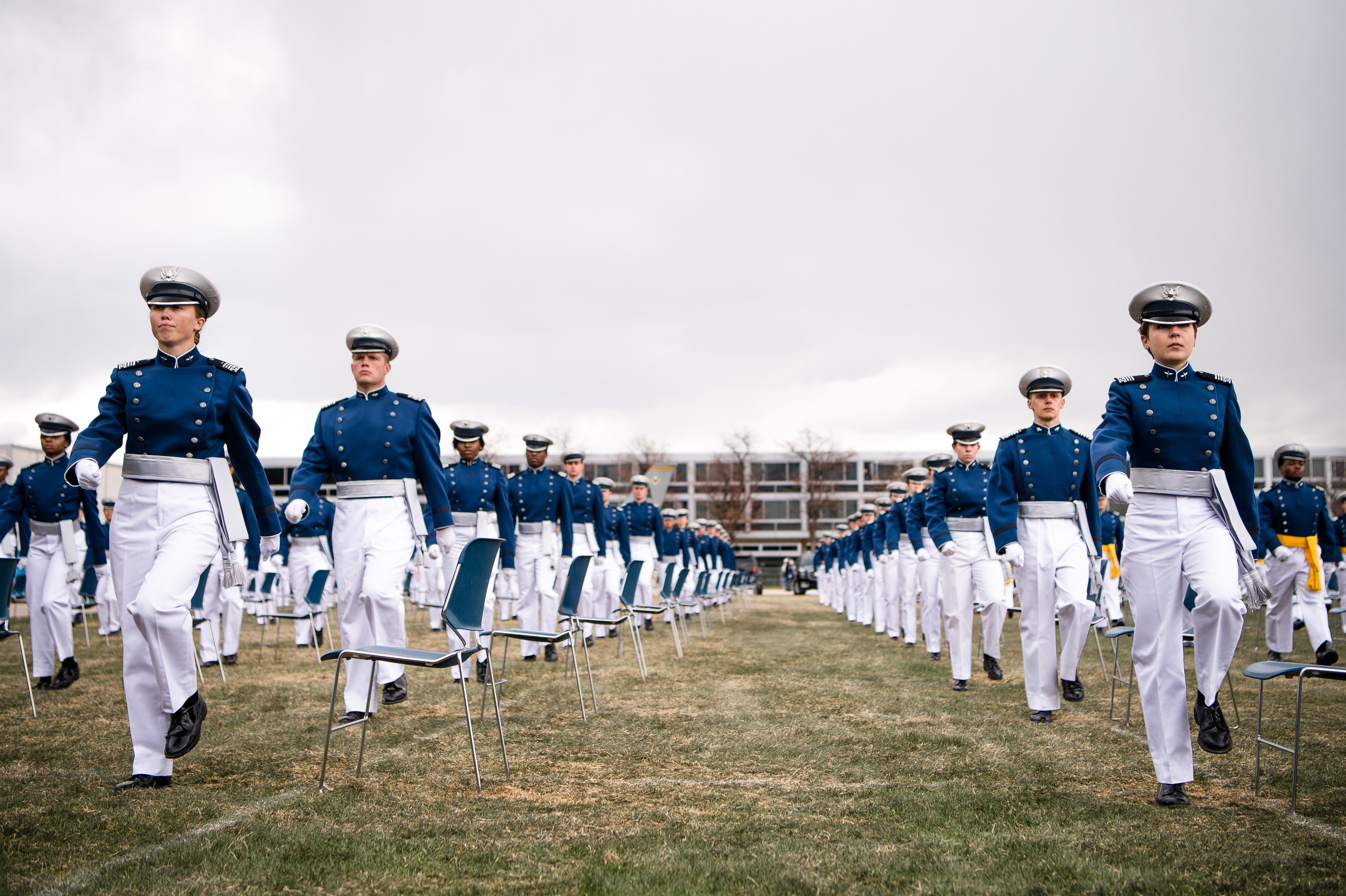
The United States Air Force Academy commissions officers into the United States Air Force and United States Space Force.

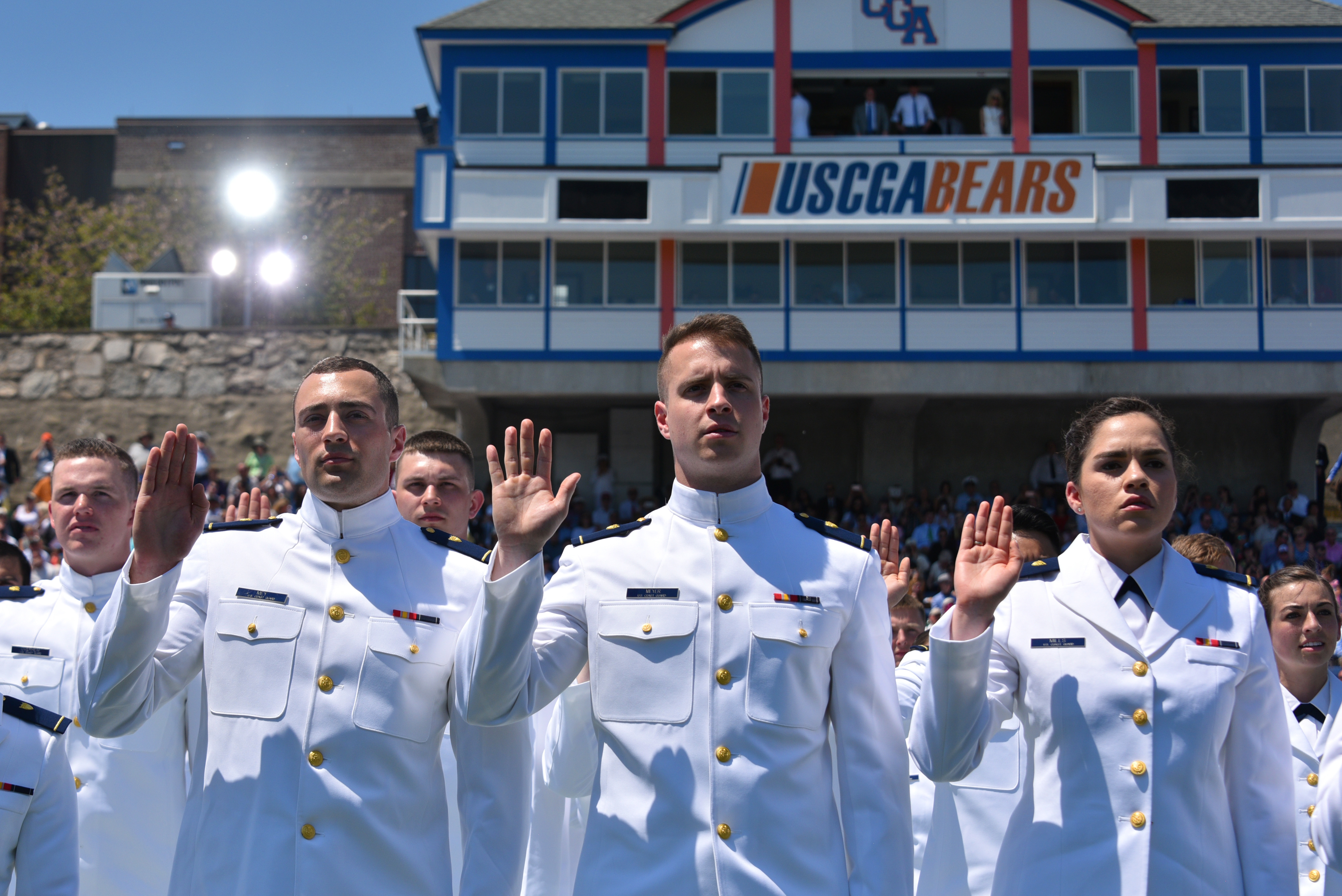
The United States Coast Guard Academy commissions officers into the United States Coast Guard.

Officers are commissioned through the United States service academies, Reserve Officer Training Corps programs, and the Officer Candidate and Officer Training Schools.

During a time of war, officers may be promoted to five-star ranks, with general of the Army, fleet admiral, and general of the Air Force the only five-star ranks currently authorized.

==== Warrant officer corps ====
NATO rank	WO-5	WO-4	WO-3	WO-2	WO-1
Uniformed services pay grade	W-5	W-4	W-3	W-2	W-1
United States Army
United States Army	Chief warrant officer 5	Chief warrant officer 4	Chief warrant officer 3	Chief warrant officer 2	Warrant officer 1
United States Marine Corps
United States Marine Corps	Chief warrant officer 5	Chief warrant officer 4	Chief warrant officer 3	Chief warrant officer 2	Warrant officer 1
United States Navy
United States Navy	Chief warrant officer 5	Chief warrant officer 4	Chief warrant officer 3	Chief warrant officer 2	Warrant officer 1
United States Air Force
United States Air Force	Chief warrant officer 5	Chief warrant officer 4	Chief warrant officer 3	Chief warrant officer 2	Warrant officer 1
U.S. Coast Guard
U.S. Coast Guard		Chief warrant officer 4	Chief warrant officer 3	Chief warrant officer 2
NATO rank	WO-5	WO-4	WO-3	WO-2	WO-1
Uniformed services pay grade	W-5	W-4	W-3	W-2	W-1

Warrant officers are specialists, accounting for only 8% of the officer corps. Warrant officers hold warrants from their service secretary and are specialists and experts in certain military technologies or capabilities.

The lowest-ranking warrant officers serve under a warrant, but they receive commissions from the president upon promotion to chief warrant officer 2.

They derive their authority from the same source as commissioned officers but remain specialists, in contrast to commissioned officers, who are generalists.

There are no warrant officers in the Air Force or Space Force.

Warrant officers are typically non-commissioned officers before being selected, with the exception of Army Aviation where any enlisted grade can apply for a warrant.

Army warrant officers attend the Army Warrant Officer Candidate School.

==== Enlisted corps ====
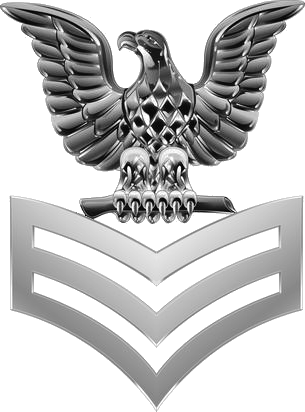
NATO code	OR-9			OR-8		OR-7		OR-6	OR-5	OR-4		OR-3	OR-2	OR-1
Uniformed services pay grade	E-9			E-8		E-7		E-6	E-5	E-4		E-3	E-2	E-1
United States Army														No insignia
United States Army	Command sergeant major		Sergeant major	First sergeant	Master sergeant	Sergeant first class		Staff sergeant	Sergeant	Corporal	Specialist	Private first class	Private	Private
United States Marine Corps														No insignia
United States Marine Corps	Sergeant major		Master gunnery sergeant	First sergeant	Master sergeant	Gunnery sergeant		Staff sergeant	Sergeant	Corporal		Lance corporal	Private first class	Private
United States Navy									E-5	E-4			E-2	No insignia
United States Navy	Fleet/Force master chief petty officer	Command master chief petty officer	Master chief petty officer	Command senior chief petty officer	Senior chief petty officer	Chief petty officer		Petty officer first class	Petty officer second class	Petty officer third class		Seaman	Seaman apprentice	Seaman recruit
United States Air Force														No insignia
United States Air Force	Command chief master sergeant	First sergeant	Chief master sergeant	First sergeant	Senior master sergeant	First sergeant	Master sergeant	Technical sergeant	Staff sergeant	Senior airman		Airman first class	Airman	Airman basic
United States Space Force
United States Space Force	Chief master sergeant			Senior master sergeant		Master sergeant		Technical sergeant	Sergeant	Specialist 4		Specialist 3	Specialist 2	Specialist 1
U.S. Coast Guard								E-6	E-5	E-4
U.S. Coast Guard	Area command master chief petty officer	Command master chief petty officer	Master chief petty officer	Senior chief petty officer		Chief petty officer		Petty officer first class	Petty officer second class	Petty officer third class		Seaman	Seaman apprentice	Seaman recruit
NATO code	OR-9			OR-8		OR-7		OR-6	OR-5	OR-4		OR-3	OR-2	OR-1
Uniformed services pay grade	E-9			E-8		E-7		E-6	E-5	E-4		E-3	E-2	E-1

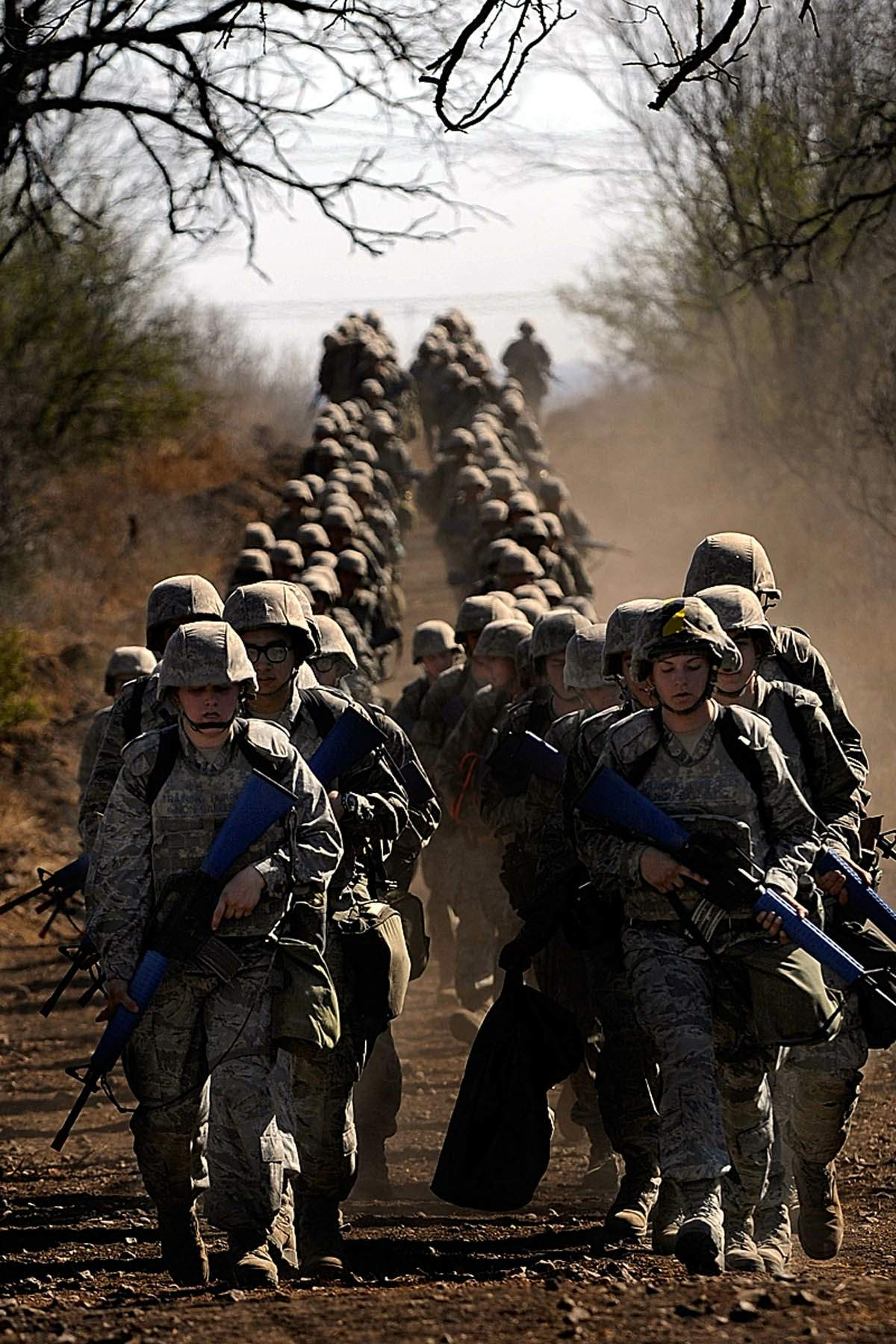
Air Force basic trainees in a base defense exercise at Air Force Basic Military Training

Enlisted personnel comprise 82% of the armed forces, serving as specialists and tactical leaders. Enlisted personnel are divided into three categories:

- E-1 to E-3/4: Junior enlisted personnel are usually in initial training or at their first assignment. E-1 to E-3 in the Marine Corps, Navy, and Coast Guard, and E-1 to E-4 in the Army, Air Force, and Space Force. In the Army, specialists (E-4) are considered to be junior enlisted, while corporals (E-4) are non-commissioned officers.
- E-4/5 to E-6: Non-commissioned officers in the Army, Marine Corps, Air Force, and Space Force and petty officers in the Navy and Coast Guard. In the Air Force and Space Force, E-5 is the first non-commissioned officer rank. Non-commissioned officers and petty officers are responsible for tactical leadership.
- E-7 to E-9: Senior non-commissioned officers in the Army, Marine Corps, Air Force, and Space Force and chief petty officers in the Navy and Coast Guard. Serve as senior enlisted advisors to officers.

The rank of senior enlisted advisor is the highest rank in each service, serving as the primary advisor to its service secretary and service chief on enlisted matters.

Prior to entering service, enlisted personnel must complete their service's basic training.

In the Army, after completing Basic Combat Training, recruits then go to advanced individual training for their military occupational specialty.

Upon completion of Marine Corps Recruit Training, Infantry Marines attend the School of Infantry. Non-infantry Marines complete Marine Combat Training before advancing to technical schools for their Military Occupational Specialty.

In the Navy, after completing Recruit Training, sailors advance to their "A" schools to complete training for their rating.

In the Air Force and Space Force, recruits complete combined Basic Military Training before going to technical training for their Air Force Specialty Codes.

In the Coast Guard, after completing Recruit Training, Coast Guardsmen advance to their "A" schools to complete training for their rating. If there are no school billets open upon graduation from recruit training, personnel serve temporarily aboard a cutter until a school billet is available.

=== Women in the armed forces ===
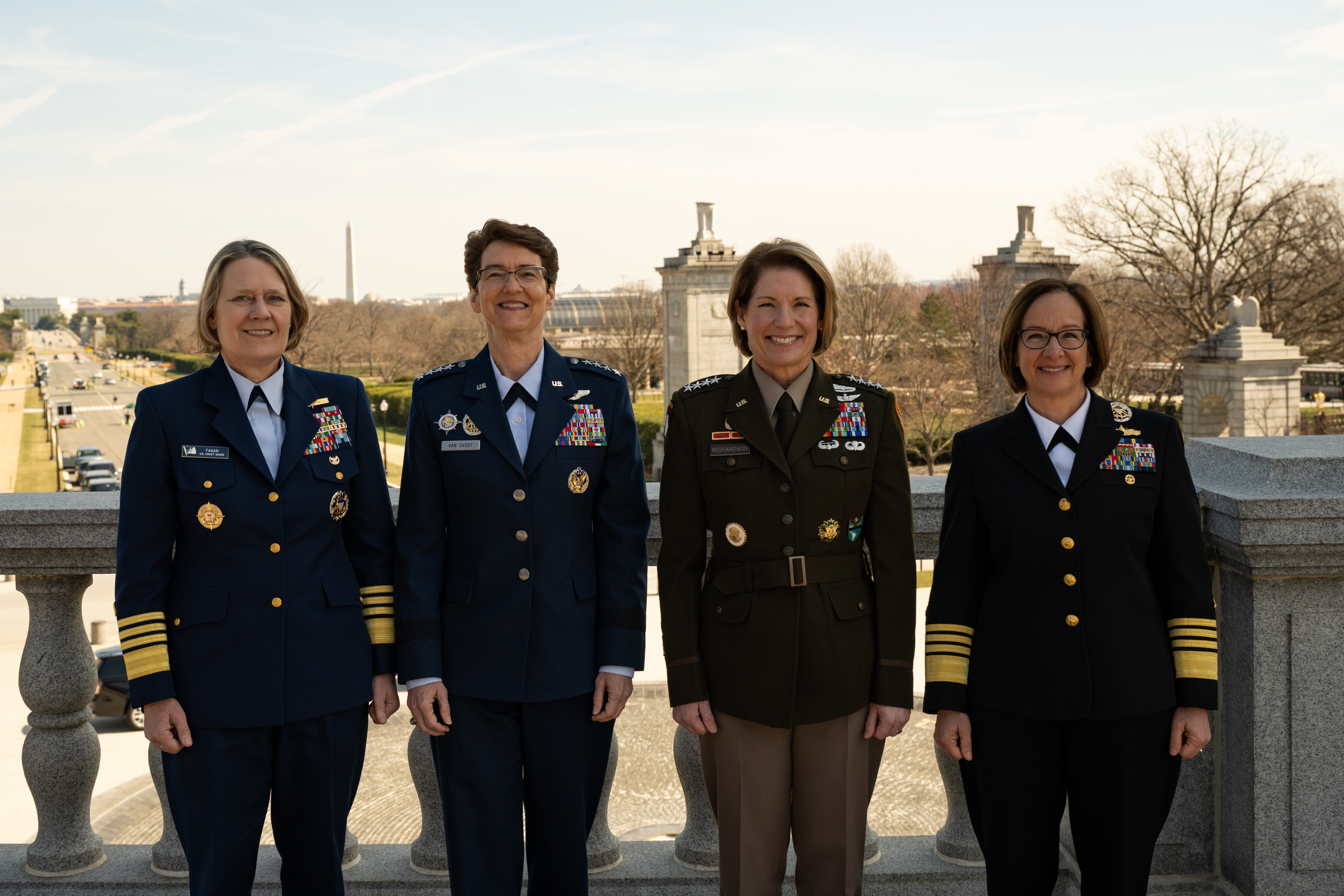
The existing four-star women in the United States Armed Forces in March 2023 during Women's History Month. From left to right: Admiral Linda L. Fagan, General Jacqueline Van Ovost, General Laura J. Richardson and Admiral Lisa Franchetti.

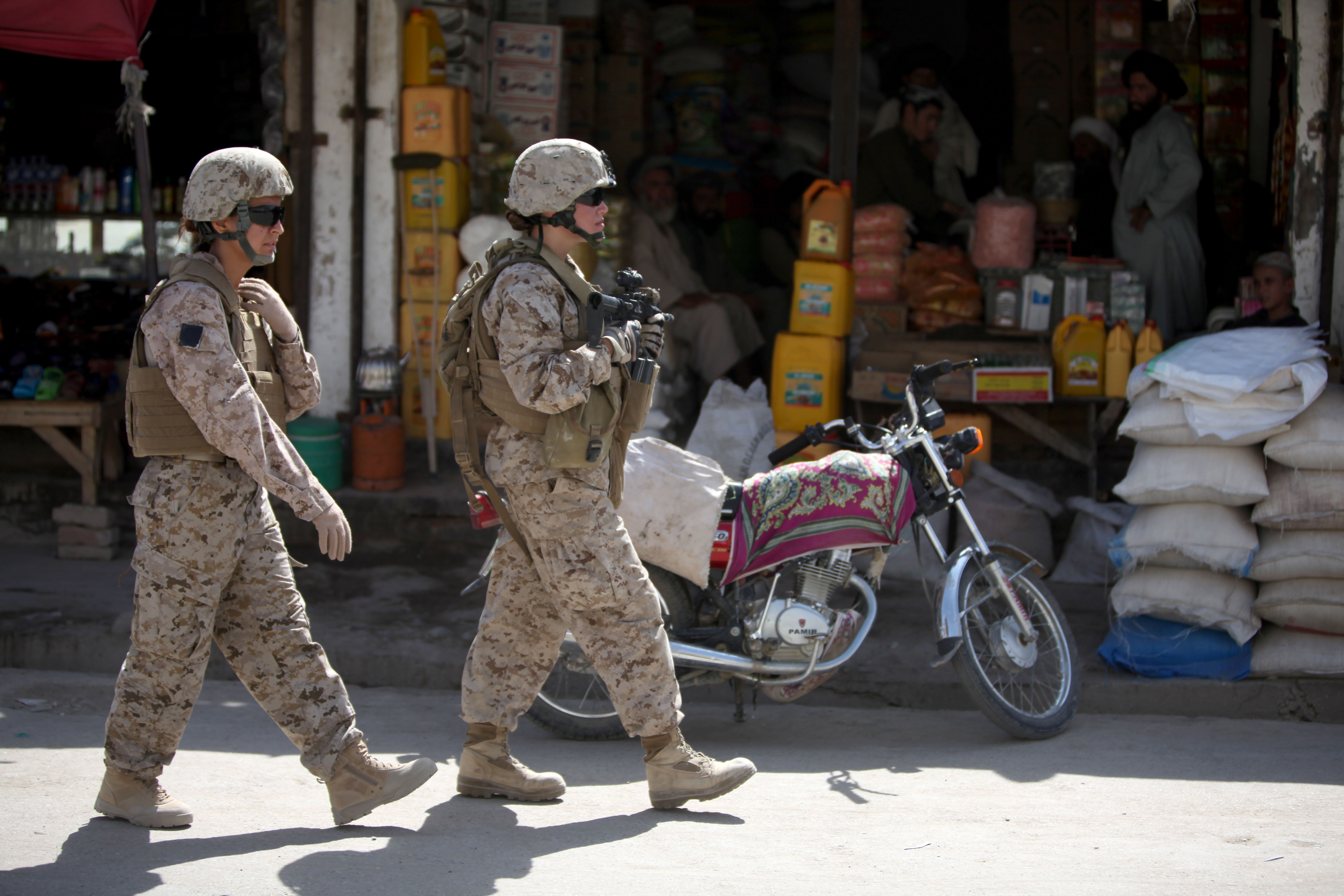
Two female Marines of the 2nd Marine Regiment patrolling in Afghanistan in 2010

Women such as Deborah Sampson disguised themselves as men to join the military during the Revolutionary War and War of 1812. Some historians estimate that as many as 400 women disguised themselves as men to enlist during the Civil War.

The first woman doctor in the Army, Mary Edwards Walker, was commissioned in 1864. In 1901, the United States Army Nurse Corps was established as a quasi-military auxiliary, followed by the United States Navy Nurse Corps in 1908.

Women were not accepted in the armed forces outside of medical roles until World War I, when they were allowed to enlist to perform clerical roles.

Women were accepted into the Naval Reserve Force in 1917, and the Marine Corps Reserves and Coast Guard in 1918.

The War Department forbid Army and National Guard posts from employing any women except as nurses, but the need for telephone operators overseas during World War I became urgent and hundreds of "Hello Girls" were recruited.

These members of the Army Signal Corps wore military uniforms and took the Army oath, but were classified as civilian employees until 1977 when their military service was officially recognized.

After the Armistice of 11 November 1918 was signed, enlisted women were demobilized and the nurse corps returned to peacetime strength. The Naval Reserve Act of 1916, which authorized the Navy to enlist "citizens", was changed in 1925 to specify "male citizens".

During World War II, all branches of the U.S. military enlisted women. The Woman's Army Auxiliary Corps (WAAC) was established by the Army in 1942 with auxiliary status, and converted to the Women's Army Corps (WAC) in June 1943. (Note: WAAC members lacked military status and legal protections; they did not receive the same pay or entitlements as male counterparts, and they had no military rank.)

Also formed during this time were the Women's Airforce Service Pilots (WASPs), the Navy's Women Accepted for Volunteer Emergency Services (WAVES), the Marine Corps Women's Reserve, and the Coast Guard Women's Reserve (SPARS).

Women experienced combat as nurses in the attack on Pearl Harbor on 7 December 1941, before the U.S. officially entered the war.

In 1944, WACs arrived in the Pacific and in Normandy. During the war, 67 Army nurses and 16 Navy nurses were captured and spent three years as Japanese prisoners of war.

There were 350,000 American women who served during World War II, and 432 were killed in the line of service. In total, they gained more than 1,500 medals, citations, and commendations.

After World War II, demobilization led to the vast majority of serving women being returned to civilian life. By 1946, the Coast Guard had demobilized all of its women members, while the other branches retained some.

Law 625, The Women's Armed Services Act of 1948, was signed by President Harry S. Truman, allowing women to serve in the U.S. Armed Forces in fully integrated units during peace time, albeit with limits that did not apply to men. (Note: The proportion of women in each service was limited to 2 percent, and additional limits were placed on commissioned ranks, age of enlistment, and designation of their family members as dependents.)

The intent of Congress was that women should be noncombatants only, but because of the difficulty in defining restrictions for the Army in the law, it was left up to the service secretaries to comply with that intent, although the law did prohibit women from serving aboard ships and on aircraft that engaged in combat missions. The Army retained a separate corps for women (WAC), while the other services integrated women into their organizational structure.

In 1951, Executive Order 10240 was issued, authorizing the services to discharge women who became pregnant or had minor children in the home (including stepchildren, foster children, and siblings).

During the Korean War of 1950–1953, many women served in the Mobile Army Surgical Hospitals. A recruiting project started in 1951 aimed to increase the number of women in the military from 40,000 to 112,000 by July 1952, but it only achieved 46,000.

Some of the reasons were the lack of public support for involvement in Korea; public disapproval of women in the military; fewer women in the right age group due to the low birthrate during the Depression; and the higher standards required for women enlistees. (Note: Women recruits had to meet higher educational, mental, and physical standards than men. In addition, they had to pass a psychiatric examination as well as "an investigation of the records of local police, mental hospitals, schools, former employers, and personal references".)

In the 1960s, recruiting and training focused on the attractiveness and femininity of women enlistees. Outside of the medical fields, women were mostly assigned to clerical, administrative, and protocol-related jobs. Women who were previously in technical positions were retrained for the few jobs now permitted for women.

Of the 61 non-combat occupational groups, only 36 were open to women by 1965. Beginning in 1965, efforts to increase the number of women in the armed forces accompanied concern about the expiration of the Selective Service Act and reduction in enlistment standards to ensure sufficient troops to support the Vietnam War.

Public Law 90-130, signed on 8 November 1967, removed the restrictions on female officers in the armed forces and in 1970, two women Army officers were promoted to brigadier general.

During the Vietnam War, 600 women served in the country as part of the Air Force, alongside 500 members of the WAC and more than 6,000 medical personnel and support staff.

The end of conscription in the early 1970s was a major driver of the expansion of the roles of women in the armed forces.

The number of enlisted and commissioned women in the military hit 110,000 by June 1977.

The Army Ordnance Corps began accepting female missile technicians in 1974. Female crew members and officers were accepted into Field Artillery missile units.

The services opened up their Reserve Officers' Training Corps (ROTC) programs to women, and in 1976, women were admitted to the service academies.

In 1974, the first six female naval aviators earned their wings as Navy pilots. The Combat Exclusion Policy that prohibited women in combat placed limitations on the pilots' advancement, but at least two retired as captains.

The role of women in the U.S. Armed Forces received global media attention during the 1991 Gulf War, though their perception in media was skewed during this time period as little media attention was given to the situations where women faced combat.

In 1991, women were permitted to fly military aircraft. Since 1994, women have been permitted to serve on U.S. combat ships.

In 2010, the ban on women serving on submarines was lifted.

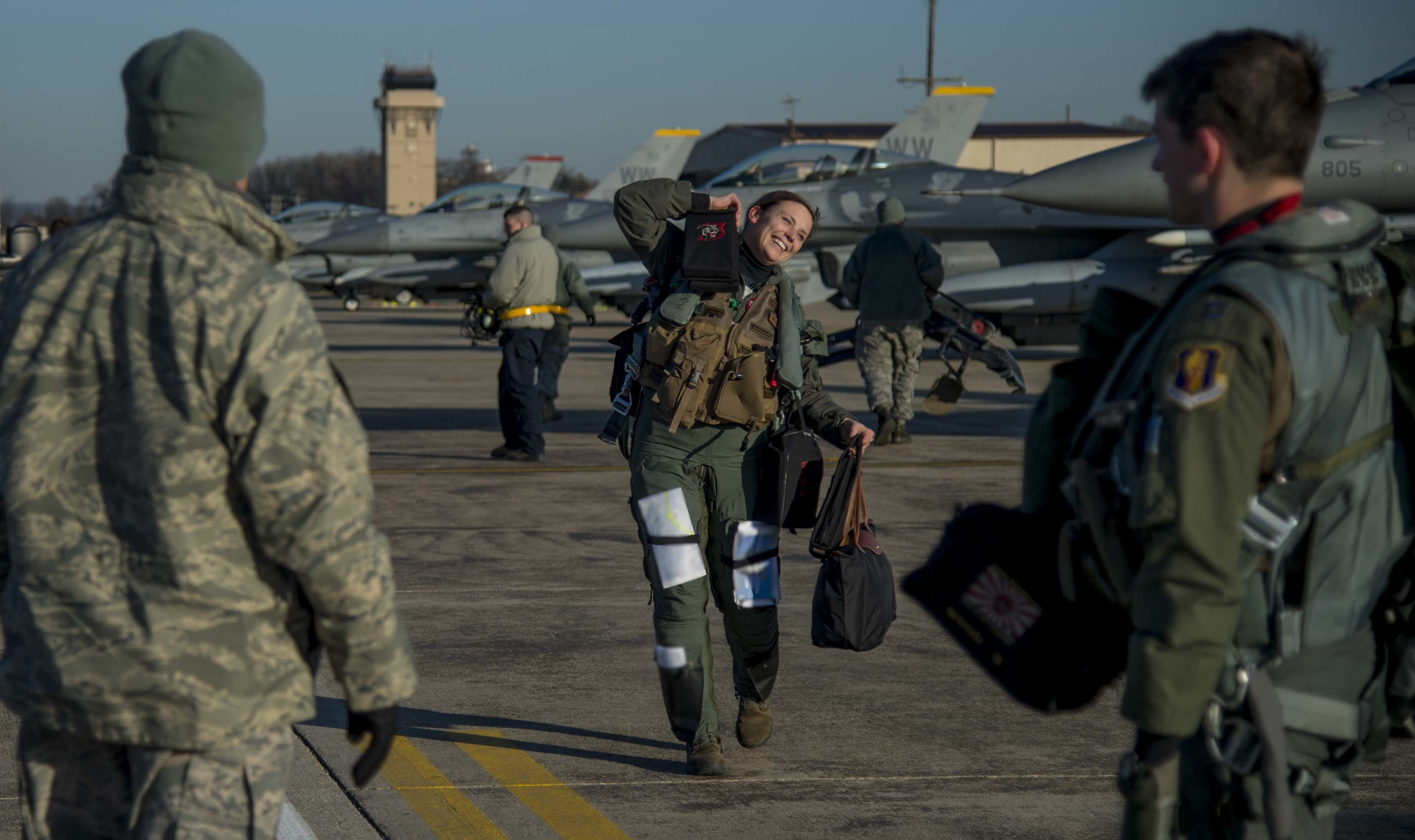
A female U.S. Air Force fighter pilot at Osan Air Base in South Korea in 2017

On 3 December 2015, U.S. defense secretary Ashton Carter announced that all military combat positions would become available to women. This gave women access to the roughly 10% of military jobs which were previously closed to them.

The various military services were given until January 2016 to provide plans on how they would enforce the policy change. Many women believed this would allow them to improve their positions in the military, since combat experience can contribute to career advancement.

Draft registration for females was recommended by the National Commission on Military, National, and Public Service and has been proposed, but never implemented.

No woman has ever become a Navy SEAL.

In July 2021, the first woman graduated from the Naval Special Warfare (NSW) training program to become a Special Warfare Combatant craft Crewman (SWCC). The SWCC directly supports the SEALs and other special forces units, and are experts in covert insertion and extraction special operation tactics.

Despite concerns of a gender gap, all personnel both men and women, at the same rank and time of service, are compensated the same across all branches.

On 1 June 2022, ADM Linda L. Fagan assumed command of the U.S. Coast Guard, becoming not only the first woman to serve as Commandant of the Coast Guard, but also the first woman in American history to serve as a service chief in the U.S. Military.

A study conducted by the RAND Corporation suggests that women who make the military their careers experience improved rates of promotion.

As per the DoD's report on sexual assault within the U.S. Army for fiscal year 2019, 7,825 cases had been reported. This represented a 3% increase relative to the 2018 report.

As of 2022, there are 228,966 women in the military, representing 17.5% of the total active duty force. Since 2021, the percentage of women on active duty service has increased slightly, by 0.3%. Since 2005, the population of active duty women has increased by 2.9%.

=== Restrictions on political activity ===
It has been a long-standing policy in the armed forces to limit the political activity by active duty members to voting and making personal campaign donations.

However, all other political activities, such as campaigning for a candidate (even outside military facilities), endorsing candidates, soliciting contributions, marching in a partisan parade or wearing the uniform to a partisan event, are prohibited.

== Order of precedence ==
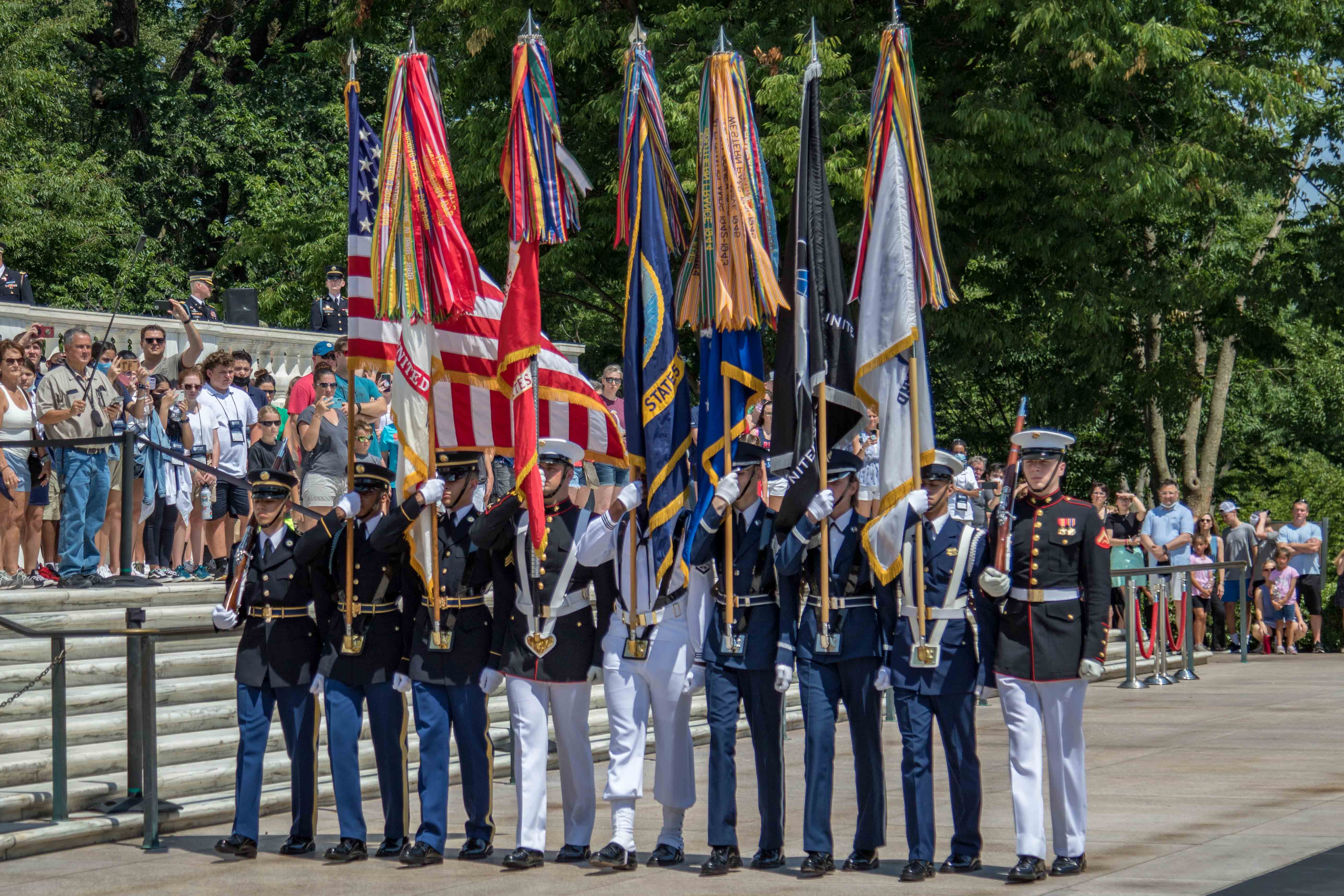
The Joint Armed Forces Color Guard at Arlington National Cemetery

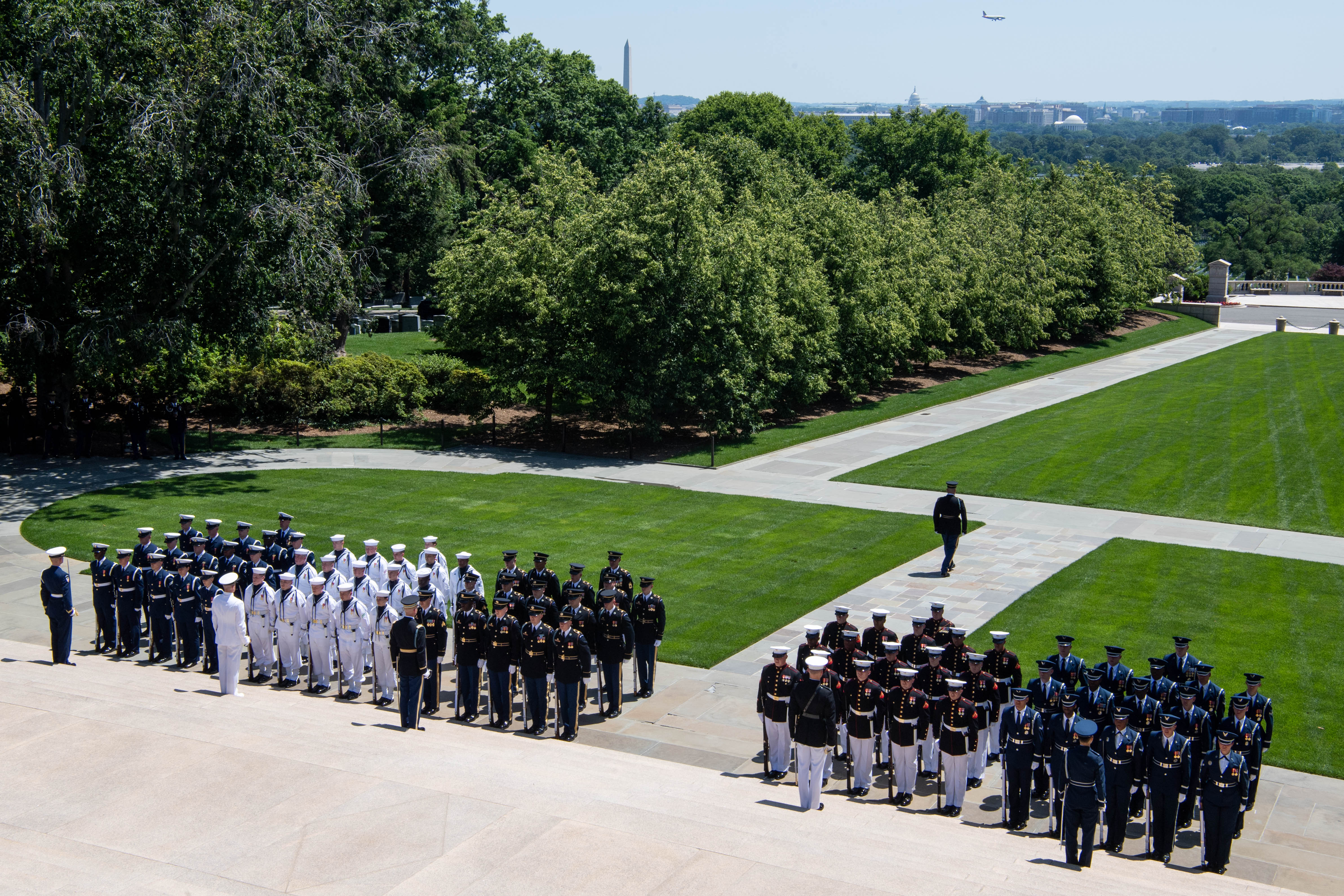
Soldiers, marines, sailors, airmen, guardians, and coast guardsmen from their services ceremonial units stand in formation at Arlington National Cemetery

Under Department of Defense regulation, the various components of the U.S. Armed Forces have a set order of precedence that is based on founding dates.

This order is used for the display of service flags as well as the placement of soldiers, marines, sailors, airmen, guardians, and coast guardsmen in formations and parades.

1. Cadets, U.S. Military Academy
2. Midshipmen, U.S. Naval Academy
3. Cadets, U.S. Air Force Academy
4. Cadets, U.S. Coast Guard Academy
5. Midshipmen, U.S. Merchant Marine Academy
6. United States Army
7. United States Marine Corps
8. United States Navy
9. United States Air Force
10. United States Space Force
11. United States Coast Guard
12. Army National Guard
13. United States Army Reserve
14. United States Marine Corps Reserve
15. United States Navy Reserve
16. Air National Guard
17. United States Air Force Reserve
18. United States Coast Guard Reserve
19. Other training and auxiliary organizations of the Army, Marine Corps, Merchant Marine, Civil Air Patrol, and Coast Guard Auxiliary, as in the preceding order

While the original founding date of a U.S. Navy was earlier than that of the Marine Corps, the Marine Corps takes precedence due to previous inconsistencies in the Navy's birth date. The Marine Corps has recognized its observed birth date on a more consistent basis.

The Second Continental Congress is considered to have established the Navy on 13 October 1775 by authorizing the purchase of ships, but the "Rules for the Regulation of the Navy of the United Colonies" were not established until 27 November 1775, and the Navy also lost funding and was temporarily discontinued in 1785.

The Marine Corps was established by an act of the Second Continental Congress on 10 November 1775. The Navy did not officially recognize 13 October 1775 as its birth date until 1972, when then–chief of naval operations Admiral Elmo Zumwalt authorized it to be observed as such.

The Coast Guard is normally situated after the Space Force, but if it is moved to the Department of the Navy, then its place in the order of precedence would change to being situated after the Navy and before the Air Force.

== See also ==
- American Forces Network
- Awards and decorations of the United States Armed Forces
- Uniforms of the United States Armed Forces
- United States war crimes
- List of American military installations
- List of notable deployments of U.S. military forces overseas since 1798
- List of military equipment of the United States
- List of active United States military aircraft
- List of currently active United States military land vehicles
- List of currently active United States military watercraft
- Military expression
- Sexual orientation and gender identity in the United States military
- Stars and Stripes (newspaper)
- State defense force
- Uniform Code of Military Justice
- United States military casualties of war
- United States military veteran suicide
- Women in the United States Army
- Women in the United States Marine Corps
- Women in the United States Navy
- Women in the United States Air Force
- Women in the United States Space Force
- Women in the United States Coast Guard
