= List of U.S. Air Force acronyms and expressions =

This is a list of initials, acronyms, expressions, euphemisms, jargon, military slang, and sayings in common or formerly common use in the United States Air Force. Many of the words or phrases have varying levels of acceptance among different units or communities, and some also have varying levels of appropriateness (usually dependent on how senior the user is in rank). Many terms also have equivalents among other service branches that are comparable in meaning. Many acronyms and terms have come into common use from voice procedure use over communication channels, translated into the NATO phonetic alphabet, or both. Acronyms and abbreviations are common in Officer and Enlisted Performance Reports, but can differ between major commands.

== 0–9 ==
- 1st Lt – First Lieutenant; officer pay grade O-2
- 2d Lt – Second Lieutenant; officer pay grade O-1
- 3C – Cross Cultural Competence

== A ==
- A1C – Airman First Class; enlisted pay grade E-3, known as Airman Second Class (A2C) from 1952 to 1967
- A2C – Airman Second Class; former enlisted pay grade E-3 from 1952 to 1967, now designated as A1C
- A3C – Airman Third Class; former enlisted pay grade E-2 from 1952 to 1967, now designated as Amn
- AADS – Alaskan Air Defense Sector
- AAFES – Army and Air Force Exchange Service (pronounced "A-Fees")
- AB – Airman Basic; enlisted pay grade E-1
- AB – Air Base
- ABDR – Aircraft Battle Damage Repair
- ABM – Air Battle Manager
- ABU – Airman Battle Uniform
- ABW – Air Base Wing
- ACA – Airspace Control Authority
- ACC – Air Combat Command, also Area Control Center
- ACFT – Aircraft
- ACO – Aerospace Control Officer
- ACOT – Advanced Communications Officer Training
- ACS – Air Control Squadron
- ACSC – Air Command and Staff College
- ACT – Air Combat Training
- ACW – Air Control Wing
- ADC – Area Defense Counsel
- ADC – (Obsolete term) Air Defense Command, later Aerospace Defense Command (disestablished MAJCOM)
- ADCON – Administrative Control
- ADP – Airman Development Plan
- ADPE – Automated Data Processing Equipment
- ADR – Airfield Damage Repair
- ADSC – Active Duty Service Commitment
- AEF – Aerospace Expeditionary Force
- AES – Aeromedical Evacuation Squadron
- AETC – Air Education and Training Command
- AETS – Aeromedical Evacuation Training Squadron
- AEW – Air Expeditionary Wing
- AFA – Air Force Academy
- AFA – Air Force Association
- AFAA – Air Force Audit Agency
- AFAM – Air Force Achievement Medal
- AFAMS – Air Force Agency for Modeling and Simulation
- AFB – Air Force Base
- AFC2IC – Air Force Command and Control Integration Center
- AFCA – Air Force Communications Agency
- AFCAA – Air Force Cost Analysis Agency
- AFCAT – Air Force Catalog
- AFCEC – Air Force Civil Engineering Center
- AFCEE – Air Force Center for Engineering and the Environment
- AFCENT – Air Forces Central
- AFCESA – Air Force Civil Engineer Support Agency
- AFCFM – Air Force Career Field Manager
- AFCLC – Air Force Culture and Learning Center
- AFCM – Air Force Commendation Medal
- AFDC – Air Force Doctrine Center
- AFDW – Air Force District of Washington
- AFE – Aircrew Flight Equipment
- AFETS – Air Force Engineering and Technical Services
- AFFMA – Air Force Frequency Management Agency
- AFFSA – Air Force Flight Standards Agency
- AFFSC – Air Force Financial Services Center
- AFGSC – Air Force Global Strike Command
- AFH – Air Force Handbook
- AFHRA – Air Force Historical Research Agency
- AFI – Air Force Instruction; or as a duty status, awaiting further instructions
- AFIA – Air Force Inspection Agency
- AFIAA – Air Force Intelligence Analysis Agency
- AFIS – Air Force Inspection System
- AFISRA – Air Force Intelligence, Surveillance and Reconnaissance Agency
- AFIT – Air Force Institute of Technology
- AFLC – Air Force Logistics Command (disestablished MAJCOM; merged with AFSC in 1992 to form AFMC)
- AFLMA – Air Force Logistics Management Agency
- AFLOA – Air Force Legal Operations Agency
- AFMA – Air Force Manpower Agency
- AFMAN – Air Force Manual
- AFMC – Air Force Materiel Command
- AFMOA – Air Force Medical Operations Agency
- AFMPC – Air Force Military Personnel Center (obsolete), replaced with AFPC
- AFMS – Air Force Medical Service or Air Force Manpower Standards
- AFMSA – Air Force Medical Support Agency
- AFNIC – Air Force Network Integration Center
- AFNOC – Air Force Network Operations Center
- AFNORTH – Air Forces Northern
- AFNSEPO – Air Force National Security Emergency Preparedness Office
- AFNWCA – Air Force Nuclear Weapons and Counterproliferation Agency
- AFOG – Air Force Operations Group
- AFOSI – Air Force Office of Special Investigations
- AFOQT – Air Force Officer Qualifying Test
- AFOTEC – Air Force Operational Test and Evaluation Center
- AFPAA – Air Force Public Affairs Agency
- AFPAM – Air Force Pamphlet
- AFPC – Air Force Personnel Center
- AFPCA – Air Force Pentagon Communications Agency
- AFPD – Air Force Policy Directive
- AFPEO – Air Force Program Executive Office
- AFPET – Air Force Petroleum Agency
- AFPOA – Air Force Personnel Operations Agency
- AFRAT - Air Force Radiation Assessment Team
- AFRBA – Air Force Review Boards Agency
- AFRC – Air Force Reserve Command
- AFRCC – Air Force Rescue Coordination Center
- AFRIMS – Air Force Records Information Management System
- AFRL – Air Force Research Lab
- AFROTC – Air Force Reserve Officers Training Corps
- AFRPA – Air Force Real Property Agency
- AFS – Air Force Station
- AFSA – Air Force Sergeants Association
- AFSC – Air Force Sustainment Center The mission of the Air Force Sustainment Center is to Sustain Weapon System Readiness to generate Air power for America. The center provides war-winning expeditionary capabilities to the war fighter through world-class depot maintenance, supply chain management and installation support.
- AFSC – Air Force Safety Center
- AFSC – Air Force Specialty Code
- AFSC – Air Force Systems Command (disestablished MAJCOM; merged with AFLC in 1992 to form AFMC)
- AFSCF – Air Force Satellite Control Facility
- AFSFC – Air Force Security Forces Center
- AFSO 21 – Air Force Smart Operations for the 21st Century
- AFSOC – Air Force Special Operations Command
- AFSOUTH – Air Forces Southern
- AFSPC – Air Force Space Command
- AFSVA – Air Force Services Agency
- AFT – Alert Fire Team
- AFTO – Air Force Technical Order
- AFVA – Air Force Visual Aids
- AFVEC – Air Force Virtual Education Center
- AFWA – Air Force Weather Agency
- AG (TAG) – Adjutant General, (The)
- AGE – Aerospace Ground Equipment; analogous to Ground Support Equipment (GSE) in USN, USMC and USCG (Naval Aviation)
- AGE Ranger – An AGE Technician
- AGR – Active Guard and Reserve
- AGS – Aircraft Generation Squadron
- AGSM – Anti-G Straining Maneuver
- AGOW – Air-Ground Operations Wing
- AIRA – Air Attaché
- AKRAOC – Alaska Region Air Operations Center
- ALCM – Air Launched Cruise Missile
- ALCON – All Concerned (used in message headers for mass emailings)
- ALO – Air Liaison Officer
- ALS – Airman Leadership School
- AMC – Air Mobility Command
- AMJAMS – Automated Military Justice Analysis and Management System
- Amn – Airman; enlisted pay grade E-2
- AMMO Troop – Munitions Systems Technician AMMO (U.S. Air Force)
- AMMS – Airborne Missile Maintenance Squadron Missile Badge
- AMS – Academy of Military Science
- AMT – Aircraft Metals Technology
- AMW – Air Mobility Wing/Anti-morale Warfare
- AMXS – Aircraft Maintenance Squadron
- ANG – Air National Guard
- ANR – Alaskan NORAD Region
- AO – Authorized Outage
- AOC – Air and Space Operations Center
- AOG – Aircraft On Ground
- AP – Air Police (Obsolete term); now called Security Forces (SF)
- APS – Aerial Port Squadron
- ARI – Alcohol Related Incident
- ARS – (Obsolete term) Air Rescue Squadron; formerly ARRS, now known as a Rescue Squadron (RQS)
- ARRS – (Obsolete term) Aerospace Rescue and Recovery Squadron
- ART – AEF (Air Expeditionary Force) Reporting Tool
- ART – Air Reserve Technician
- ART – Armed or Alarm or Area Response Team
- ARW – Air Refueling Wing
- AS – Airlift Squadron
- AS – Air Station
- ASAP – As Soon As Possible
- ASBC – Air and Space Basic Course
- ASI – Authorized Service Interruption
- ASOC – Air Support Operations Center (formerly DASC – Direct Air Support Center)
- ASR – Airport Surveillance Radar
- ATAG – Assistant to the Adjutant General
- ATC – Air traffic control
- ATC – Air Training Command (disestablished MAJCOM; superseded in 1992 by AETC)
- ATCALS – Air Traffic Control and Landing Systems
- ATO – Air Tasking Order
- ATO – Anti-Terrorism Officer
- ATO – Authority to Operate
- AU – Air University
- AU-ABC – Air University Associate to Baccalaureate Cooperative
- AV – Avionics
- AW – Airlift Wing
- AWACS – Airborne Warning and Control System on the E-3 Sentry aircraft
- AWC – Air War College
- AWOL – Absent Without Leave
- AWP – Awaiting Parts

== B ==
- BAH – Basic Allowance for Housing
- BAS – Basic Allowance for Subsistence
- BASH – Bird/Wildlife Aircraft Strike Hazard
- BAQ – Bachelor Airman Quarters
- BCOT – Basic Communications Officer Training
- BDOC – Base Defense Operations Center
- BDU – Battle Dress Uniform
- BEQ – Bachelor Enlisted Quarters
- BIT – Bystander Intervention Training
- BITC – Base Information Transfer Center
- BITS – Base Information Transfer System
- BFM – Basic Fighter Maneuvers
- BFT – Blue Force Tracking
- BLUF – Bottom Line Up Front
- BMT – Basic Military Training
- BOHICA – Bend Over, Here It Comes Again; used in response to unfavorable orders.
- BONE – Nickname for the B-1 Lancer, as in "B-ONE"
- BOQ – Bachelor Officer Quarters
- BOS – Base Operating Support
- BOT – Basic Officer Training
- Box Nasty – A sandwich & snack meal in a cardboard box handed out for flights
- BPZ – Below Primary Zone; early promotion of an officer ahead of peers to controlled statutory pay grades of O-4, O-5 and/or O-6
- BRAC – Base Realignment and Closure
- Brig Gen – Brigadier General; officer pay grade O-7
- BRM – Base Records Manager
- BS – Bomb Squadron
- BSA – Basic Surface Attack
- BTZ – Below the zone; USAF early promotion program from E-3 to E-4
- BUFF – Big Ugly Fat Fucker (Nickname for Boeing B-52 Stratofortress)
- BW – Bomb Wing
- BX – Base Exchange (see AAFES)

== C ==
- C-Day – The unnamed day on which a deployment operation begins or is to begin
- C2 – Command and Control
- C4ISR – Command, Control, Communications, Computers, Intelligence, Surveillance, and Reconnaissance
- CA – Combat Arms
- CAF – Combat Air Force
- CAFSC – Control Air Force Specialty Code
- CAI – Computer Aided Instruction
- CAOC – Combined Air and Space Operations Center
- CAMS – Core Automated Maintenance System (database behind IMDS)
- CANX – Cancelled
- CAP – Civil Air Patrol, the civilian USAF Auxiliary
- CAP – Combat air patrol, a kind of sortie mission
- CAP-USAF – Air Force support, liaison and oversight of Civil Air Patrol
- Capt – Captain; officer pay grade O-3
- CAS – Close Air Support
- CAST – Combat Airman Skills Training
- CAT – Crisis Action Team
- CAT – Camper Alert Team (Security Forces, Missile Field Security)
- CATCH-22 — Inescapable situation. Stuck between a rock & a hard place. Read the book. Joseph Heller
- CATM – Combat Arms Training and Maintenance
- CBCS – Combat Communications Squadron
- CBMC – Communications Battlespace Management Course
- CBT – Computer Based Training
- CBRNE – Chemical, Biological, Radiological, Nuclear, and High Yield Explosives
- CC – Commander
- CCC – Commanders Chief
- CCG - Computer Control Group
- CCMDR - Crew Commander
- CCS – Commanders Secretary
- CCAF – Community College of the Air Force
- CCE – Executive Officer
- CCF – First Sergeant
- CCT – Combat Control
- CD – Deputy Commander
- CDC – Career Development Course
- CE – Civil Engineering or Civil Engineers
- CEG – Combat Evaluation Group
- CEM – Chief Enlisted Manager
- CES – Civil Engineering Squadron
- CEVG – Combat Evaluation Group
- CFEPT – Career Field Education and Training Plan
- CFP – Communications Focal Point
- CFR – Crash Fire Rescue
- CFT – Cockpit Familiarization Trainer
- CGO – Company Grade Officer (lieutenants and captains)
- CGOC – Company Grade Officers' Council
- Ch – Chaplain
- Charlie Bravo – Cut-back, or being released early from duty
- Charlie Foxtrot – Cluster Fuck
- Chief – Proper term of address for Chief Master Sergeant. Also frequently used by pilots to informally refer to maintenance personnel, specifically "Crew Chiefs."
- CI – Counterintelligence
- CI – Compliance Inspection
- CIF - Crew Information Folder
- CISM – Close In Security Mobile
- Class Six – BX-administered store where beer, wine & liquor is sold at a discounted price with no sales tax
- CJCS – Chairman of the Joint Chiefs of Staff
- CMO – Civil-Military Operations
- CMO – Chief Medical Officer (term for senior medical officer at each MEPS – Military Entrance Processing Station)
- CMSAF – Chief Master Sergeant of the Air Force; senior active duty enlisted member of the Air Force and a direct advisor to CSAF (holds enlisted pay grade E-9)
- CMSgt – Chief Master Sergeant; enlisted pay grade E-9
- CNA – Computer Network Attack
- CND – Could Not Duplicate
- CND – Computer Network Defense
- CNO – Computer Network Operations
- CNT – Counter Narco-Terror
- COA – Course of Action
- Col – Colonel; officer pay grade O-6
- COLA – Cost of Living Adjustment
- COMINT – Communications Intelligence
- CONOPS – Concept of Operations
- CONS – Contracting Squadron
- CONUS – Continental United States
- COMAFFOR – Commander, Air Force Forces
- Cop – term for Air Force Security Forces personnel
- COT – Commissioned Officer Training
- CPF – Civilian Personnel Flight
- CPTS – Comptroller Squadron
- Crew Chief – Generally used as an informal slang term for Aerospace Maintenance Personnel, AFSC 2A5. More formally used to refer to an individual in charge of an aircraft maintenance related task requiring multiple people.
- CRC – Control & Reporting Center
- CRO – Combat Rescue Officer; commissioned officer equivalent of an enlisted PJ
- CRO – COMSEC Responsible Officer
- CRS – Corneal Refractive Surgery
- CS – Communications Squadron
- CSAF – Chief of Staff of the Air Force; senior ranking active duty General in USAF unless the CJCS or VCJCS post is held by a USAF General (holds officer pay grade O-10)
- CSAR – Combat Search and Rescue
- CSC – Central Security Control
- CSS – Commander's Support Staff (orderly room)
- CSO – Combat Systems Officer; a commissioned officer aeronautical rating known as Navigator until 1992
- CV – Vice Commander
- CUI – Combined Unit Inspection
- CWO – Chief Warrant Officer; commissioned officer pay grades W-2 through W-5, currently discontinued in USAF

== D ==
- D-Day – The unnamed day on which an operation begins or is to begin
- DACBT – Dissimilar Air Combat Training
- DAFSC – Duty Air Force Specialty Code
- DART – Dumbass Radio Troop
- DAS – Date Arrived Station
- DATT – Defense Attaché
- DBA – Dirtbag Airman (An Airman who does not represent the Air Force Core Values)
- DCO – Defensive Cyber Operations
- DEAD – Destruction of Enemy Air Defenses
- DEERS – Defense Eligibility Enrollment Reporting System
- DEROS – Date Estimated Return from OverSeas
- Dependent – Non-Military family member of a service member, typically a non-military spouse and/or children, entitled to a DD 1173 Military Dependent ID Card
- DFAC – Dining Facility
- DFAS – Defense Finance and Accounting Service
- Dickbeaters – term referring to one's hands. Often yelled by MTIs in the form of "pin those Dickbeaters to your side!"
- DINSTAAR – Danger Is No Stranger To An AGE Ranger (See AGE)
- Disgruntled Airman - In basic training, when things aren't up to par during dorm inspections, any and all write-ups can be blamed on this fictional spectre
- DMSP – Defense Meteorological Satellite Program
- DNIF – Duties Not Including Flying
- DOE – Date of Enlistment
- Dollar Ride – A pilot's first flight in an airframe
- Doolie – nickname for a first year Air Force Academy cadet
- DOR – Date of Rank
- Double Dip – Term used for certain full-time Air Force Reserve and Air National Guard personnel when in a dual status and receiving income from two sources (e.g., Air Reserve Technician on civilian military leave as a Department of the Air Force civil servant and on concurrent active duty USAF orders)
- DRSN – Defense Red Switch Network
- DRU – Direct Reporting Unit
- DSCS – Defense Satellite Communications System
- DSD – Developmental Special Duty
- DSN – Defense Switched Network
- DSO - Defensive Systems Officer
- DSP – Defense Support Program
- DSPD – Defense Support to Public Diplomacy
- DT – Development Team
- DTG – Days To Go
- DTS – Defense Travel System
- DV – Distinguished Visitor; visiting enlisted personnel in pay grade E-9, visiting officer personnel in pay grades O-6 through O-10, or visiting civilian equivalents such as GS-15, SES or politically appointed or elected government officials
- DVQ – Distinguished Visitors Quarters
- DVOQ – Distinguished Visiting Officers Quarters
- DWC – Deputy Wing Chaplain
- DZ – Drop Zone

== E ==
- EAD – Extended Active Duty
- EADS – Eastern Air Defense Sector
- ECM – Electronic Counter Measures
- ECP – Entry Control Point
- EELV – Evolved Expendable Launch Vehicle
- EET – Exercise Evaluation Team
- EFMP – Exceptional Family Member Program
- EHE - Expected Horizontal Error
- EI – Engineering & Installation
- EIS – Engineering & Installation Squadron
- ELINT – Electronic signals Intelligence
- EGI – Embedded GPS/Inertial Navigation
- Embrace The Suck – Slang used among junior enlisted referencing they have little say in undesirable decisions, effectively advice that one should not worry themselves over things they cannot control
- EMEDS – Expeditionary Medical Support
- EMSEC – Emission Security
- ENJJPT – Euro NATO Joint Jet Pilot Training
- EO – Equal Opportunity
- EOC – Emergency Operations Center
- EOD – Explosive Ordnance Disposal
- EPR – Enlisted Performance Report
- ERCC – Engine Run Crew Change
- E-VAR – Electronic Visitor Access Request
- ERO – Engine Running Onload/Offload
- EW – Electronic Warfare
- EWO – Electronic Warfare Officer

== F ==
- FA – Fitness Assessment
- FAA – Federal Aviation Administration
- FAB – Forward Air Base
- FAC – Forward Air Controller
- FAIP – First Assignment Instructor Pilot
- FAM – Functional Area Manager
- Farts and darts – clouds and darts embroidery found on field grade and general officers' service cap visors
- Fat Albert – Nickname used for the C-5A Galaxy until revoked by USAF as “derogatory”. Name came from Bill Cosby's recording of “Revenge” in 1968, with the story of “Buck Buck” and Fat Albert shaking the ground as he ran.
- FGO – Field Grade Officer (majors, lieutenant colonels, and colonels)
- FIGMO – Fuck it I Got My Orders
- Fini Flight – A pilot's last flight in the aircraft before he/she leaves a squadron, a wing, or retires from the Air Force
- FLPP – Foreign Language Profeciency Pay
- FM – Financial Management Comptroller
- FMC – Fully Mission Capable
- FMS – Foreign Military Sales
- FMS – Field Maintenance Squadron
- FNG – Fucking New Guy
- FOA – Field Operating Agency
- FOD – Foreign Object Damage or debris that can cause damage
- FOUO – For Official Use Only
- Four Fan Trash Can – Nickname for the C-130 Hercules
- Four Fans of Freedom – Nickname for the C-130 Hercules
- Fox One - Brevity code for a simulated or actual release of a semi-active radar-guided air-to-air missile, such as the AIM-7 Sparrow.
- Fox Two - Brevity code for a simulated or actual release of an infrared-guided air-to-air missile, such as the AIM-9 Sidewinder.
- Fox Three - Brevity code for a simulated or actual launch of an active radar-guided air-to-air missile, such as the AIM-120 AMRAAM.
- FRED – Fucking Ridiculous Economic Disaster (term for the C-5 Galaxy)
- FS – Fighter Squadron
- FSB – Force Shaping Board
- FSS – Force Support Squadron
- FTAC – First Term Airman's Center
- FTS – Flying Training Squadron
- FTU – Formal Training Unit
- FTW – Flying Training Wing
- FUBAR – Fucked Up Beyond All Recognition
- FW – Fighter Wing
- FW&A – Fraud, Waste and Abuse
- FYSA – For Your Situational Awareness

== G ==
- G-LOC – G-induced Loss of Consciousness
- GAB – Ground Abort; Aircraft flight/sortie that canceled before take-off
- GBS – Global Broadcast Service (pronounced: jibz–IPA: dʒɪbz)
- GC / GNC – Guidance and Control
- GCCS – Global Command and Control System (pronounced: geeks–IPA: giks)
- GCIC – Global Cyberspace Integration Center
- GCS – Ground Control Station
- GDT – Ground Data Terminal
- Gen – General; officer pay grade O-10
- GLCM – Ground Launched Cruise Missile
- GO – General Officer – officers in pay grades O-7, O-8, O-9 and O-10 (analogous to a Flag Officer)
- GOCO – Government Owned, Contractor Operated
- GOGO – Government Owned, Government Operated
- GOV – Government Owned Vehicle
- Gp – Group
- GPC – Government Purchase Card
- GPS – Global Positioning System
- GTC – Government Travel Card
- GV – Giant Voice (RF Trans)
- GuDawg – F-4 Phantom Crew Chief made of Iron (from Tae Gu ROK)
- GWOT – Global War On Terrorism

== H ==
- HAF – Headquarters Air Force
- HALO – High Altitude, Low Opening
- HAHO – High Altitude, High Opening
- Hangar "[#]" – A nonexistent hangar (e.g., if there are 4 hangars, then it would be Hangar 5); heard most often over radios as slang code for latrine/bathroom/Porta John. Example: "Get me to Hangar 5!"
- HARM – High Speed Anti-Radiation Missile
- HARM – Host Aviation Resource Management
- HARRT – Humanitarian Assistance Rapid Response Team
- Hawg – Nickname for the A-10 Thunderbolt II
- HAZCON – Hazardous Condition
- HC – Chaplain Headquarters
- Herk – Nickname for the C-130 Hercules
- Herky Bird – Another nickname for the C-130 Hercules
- HIA – Held in Abeyance
- HO – Historian's Office
- HPC – Historic Properties Custodian
- HTS – HARM Targeting System
- HUA – Heard, Understood, Acknowledged
- HUAW – Hurry Up and Wait
- HUD – Head-Up Display
- HUMINT – Human Intelligence

== I ==
- IA – Information Assurance
- IAW – In Accordance With
- ICBM – Intercontinental Ballistic Missile
- ID 10 T Problem – A problem that is created by an "idiot"
- IFE – In-Flight Emergency
- IFF – Identification Friend or Foe
- IFF – Introduction to Fighter Fundamentals
- IFFCC – Integrated Flight and Fire Control Computer
- IFS – Introductory Flight Screening
- IFT – Introductory Flight Training
- IG – Inspector General
- ILS – Instrument landing system
- IMDS – Integrated Maintenance Database System
- IMINT – Imagery Intelligence
- INOP – Inoperative/Inoperable
- INOSC – Integrated Network Operations and Security Center
- IP – Instructor Pilot
- IPB – Illustrated Parts Breakdown - Used for maintainers
- IPB – Intelligence Preparation of the Battlespace
- IO – Information Operations
- IOC – Initial Operational Capability
- IOIC – Information Operations Integration Course
- IS – Intelligence Squadron
- ISR – Intelligence, Surveillance, and Reconnaissance
- ISRLO – Intelligence, Surveillance, and Reconnaissance Liaison Officer
- ISSM – Information Systems Security Manager
- ISSO – Information Systems Security Officer
- ITT – Information, Tickets, and Travel
- IYAAYAS – If You Ain't Ammo, You Ain't Shit
- IYAAYWOT – If You Ain't Ammo, You're Waitin' On Them

== J ==
- J-STARS – Joint Surveillance Target Attack Radar System on the E-8 JSTARS aircraft
- JA – Judge Advocate
- JA/ATT – Joint Airborne/ Air Transportability Training
- JAOC – Joint Air and Space Operations Center
- JATO – Jet-Assisted Take-Off
- JDAM – Joint Direct Attack Munition
- JEEP – Just Enough Education To Pass
- JEEP – Just Entering Electronic Principals
- JEEP – Just Educated Enough to Post (Security Forces)
- JFACC – Joint Forces Air Component Commander
- JEIM – Jet Engine Intermediate Maintenance
- JOAP – Joint Oil Analysis Program
- JOPES – Joint Operation Planning and Execution System
- JPATS – Joint Primary Air Training System
- JPME – Joint Professional Military Education
- JPPT – Joint Primary Pilot Training
- JSF – Joint Strike Fighter
- JSOW – Joint Standoff Weapon
- JSUPT – Joint Specialized Undergraduate Pilot Training
- JWICS – Joint Worldwide Intelligence Communications System

== K ==
- KIA - Killed In Action
- KISS – Keep It Simple, Stupid

== L ==
- LAPES – Low Altitude Parachute Extraction System
- LATN – Low Altitude Tactical Navigation
- Lawn Dart – Nickname for F-16 Fighting Falcon or any other fast, pointy-nosed, single-engine fighter aircraft
- LCAP – Logistics Compliance Assessment Program
- LEAP – Language Enabled Airman Program
- LFE – Large Formation Exercise
- LG – Logistics Group
- LGB – Laser-Guided Bomb
- LIFT – Lead In Fighter Training
- LIMFAC – Limiting Factor
- Linda Lovelace (Reference to the C-5 Galaxy aircraft, because it kneels and takes it from both ends)
- LMR – Land Mobile Radio
- LOA – Letter of Admonishment
- LOA – Letter of Appreciation
- LOAC – Law of Armed Conflict
- LOC – Letter of Counseling
- LOGI – Logistics NCOIC (Squadron, Group, Wing)
- LOR – Letter of Reprimand
- LOWAT – Low Altitude Training
- LRE - Large-Scale Readiness Exercise
- LRS – Logistics Readiness Squadron
- LT – Familiar term for a Lieutenant, Second or First; usually used as a form of address by those under his/her command
- Lt Col – Lieutenant Colonel; officer pay grade O-5
- Lt Gen – Lieutenant General; officer pay grade O-9
- LWOP – Leave Without Pay

== M ==
- MAC – Military Airlift Command (disestablished MAJCOM)
- MAF – Missile Alert Facility
- Maj – Major; officer pay grade O-4
- Maj Gen – Major General; officer pay grade O-8
- MAJCOM – Major Command
- MANPADS – Man-Portable Air Defense System
- MARE – Major Accident Response Exercise
- MASINT – Measurement and Signature Intelligence
- MATS – Military Air Transport Service (disestablished command, superseded by MAC and then AMC
- MDG – Medical Group
- MDS – Mission Design Series of aircraft; analogous to T/M/S for Type/Model/Series in USN & USMC (Naval Aviation)
- MEO – Military Equal Opportunity
- MEPS – Military Entrance Processing Station
- METL – Mission Essential Task Listing
- MFLC – Military and Family Life Counselor
- MFH – Military Family Housing
- MFT – Mobile Fire Team
- MICAP – Mission Incapable
- MICT – Management Internal Control Toolset
- MIF – Maneuver Item File
- MILDEC – Military Deception
- Militime – military time
- MILSTRIP – Military Standard Requisitioning and Issue Procedure
- MLR – Management Level Review
- MOAB – Massive Ordnance Air Blast Bomb/Mother Of All Bombs
- MOOTW – Military Operations Other than War
- MOS – Maintenance Operations Squadron
- Mosquito Wings – Nickname for the Airman rank insignia
- MPF – Military Personnel Flight
- MRE – Meal Ready to Eat
- MS – Missile Squadron
- MSA - Munitions Storage Area
- MSG – Mission Support Group
- MSME – Medical Standard Management Element
- MSgt – Master Sergeant; enlisted pay grade E-7
- MSS – Mission Support Squadron
- MTI – Military Training Instructor
- MTL – Military Training Leader

- Mud Hen – Nickname for the F-15E Strike Eagle
- MUNS - Munitions, or Munitions Squadron/Flight
- MW – Missile Wing
- MWR – Morale, Welfare and Recreation
- MWS – Major Weapons System
- MX – Maintenance
- MXG – Maintenance Group
- MXS – Maintenance Squadron

== N ==
- NAF – Numbered Air Force
- Nav – Navigator, now known since 2009 as a Combat Systems Officer
- NCC – Network Control Center
- NCE – Nuclear Certified Equipment
- NCO – Non-commissioned Officer
- NCOA – Non-commissioned Officer Academy
- NCOIC – Non-Commissioned Officer in Charge
- NCW – Network-Centric Warfare
- NDI – Nondestructive Inspection
- NEADS – Northeast Air Defense Sector
- NGB – National Guard Bureau
- NIPR – Non-secure Internet Protocol (IP) Router Network
- NKAWTG – Nobody Kicks Ass Without Tanker Gas
- NMC – Non Mission Capable
- NMSA – Non-Nuclear Munitions Storage Area
- NMUSAF – National Museum of the United States Air Force
- Nonner – "Non-sortie generating." Derogatory term used by aircraft maintenance personnel when referring to enlisted and officers who are not directly involved in aircraft maintenance or manning aircraft
- Non-rated Officer – USAF commissioned officer not holding an aeronautical rating
- NOSC – Network Operations and Security Center
- NOTAM – Notice To Airmen
- NSI – Nuclear Surety Inspection
- NVG – Night Vision Goggles
- NUB – New Useless Bitch (reference for new person on station; contraction from newbie (which was originally new boy), and then backronymed)

== O ==
- OA – Occupational Analysis
- OA – Outstanding Airman
- OAPT – Officer Awaiting Pilot Training.
- OAPTer – An officer in OAPT status. While other 2nd Lt's begin their flight training, non-flying technical training and/or initial leadership roles, OAPTers complete menial tasks in support of the mission while they wait for their assigned training date (this is known as "casual status"). It is important for all operational bases, as OAPTers are most often supplemental to the assigned commissioned officer workforce.
- OAR – Occupational Analysis Report
- OAY – Outstanding Airman of the Year
- OAYA – Outstanding Airman of the Year Award
- OCO – Offensive Cyber Operations
- OCONUS – Outside the Continental United States
- OCP – Operational Camouflage Pattern
- OCR – Office of Collateral Responsibility
- OFO – Out Fucking Off
- OG – Operations Group
- OIC – Officer in Command
- OL – Operating Location
- OODA – Observe Orient Decide Act
- OPCON – Operational Control
- OPR – Office of Primary Responsibility
- OPR – Officer Performance Report
- OPSEC – Operations Security
- OPTN – Operationalizing and Professionalizing the Network
- ORI – Operational Readiness Inspection
- ORM – Operation Risk Management
- OSI – Office of Special Investigation
- OSO - Offensive Systems Officer
- OSR – Occupational Survey Report
- OSS – Operations Support Squadron
- OT&E – Operational Test and Evaluation
- OTS – Officer Training School

== P ==
- PA – Public Affairs
- PACAF – Pacific Air Forces
- PAFSC – Primary Air Force Specialty Code
- PAR – Post Attack Reconnaissance, Precision Approach Radar
- PAS – Political Affairs Strategist
- Patch - Weapons Instructor Course [Weapons School] Graduate
- PAX – Air passengers
- PCS – Permanent Change of Station
- PDF - Personnel Deployment Function
- PDS – Permanent Duty Station
- PERSCO – Personnel Support for Contingency Operations
- Perpes – Humorous nickname for PRP, takeoff on herpes
- PFE – Promotion Fitness Examination
- PFM – Pure Fucking Magic; Term to refer to a technical problem that somehow resolved itself
- PFT – Physical Fitness Test
- PICNIC – Problem In Chair, Not In Computer; Used by help desk personnel to indicate user ignorance
- PING – Person In Need of Graduation
- PITT – Person In need of Technical Training
- PJ – Pararescueman
- PMC – Partially Mission Capable
- PME – Professional Military Education
- PMEL – Precision Measurement Equipment Laboratory
- Pocket Rocket – Term for the missile badge on the uniforms of current and former ICBM and cruise missile launch operations and missile maintenance personnel
- POL – Petroleum, Oils, & Lubricants, the traditional name for the Fuels Management Flight
- Pop Tart – Airman whose technical career schools are 6 weeks or less
- posn – position
- Prime Beef – Prime Base Engineer Emergency Force
- PRD – Pilot Reported Discrepancy
- PRF – Promotion Recommendation Form
- PRP – Personnel Reliability Program
- PSDM – Personnel Services Delivery Memorandum
- PSYOP – Psychological Operations
- PTL – Physical Training Leader

== Q ==
- QA - Quality Assurance
- QAF – Quality Air Force
- Queep – A task or duty that is completely useless and ultimately unrelated to your primary job. It is often assigned by superiors not of your career field as they assume that you have time to constantly work these tasks. Example: "I have a lot of queep to do before I go home." "I need to finish all of this queep before I can go fly."

== R ==
- RA – Resource Advisor
- RAF – Royal Air Force
- Rainbow Flight – Fresh trainees at BMT who have not yet received uniforms (clothing colors represent the rainbow)
- RAM – Random Antiterrorism Measure
- RAPCON – Radar Approach Control
- RAS – Regional Affairs Strategist
- Rated Officer – USAF commissioned officer holding an aeronautical rating as a Pilot (to include Astronaut), Combat Systems Officer (to include Astronaut), Navigator (to include Astronaut), Air Battle Manager, Observer (Astronaut) or Flight Surgeon
- RED HORSE – Rapid Engineer Deployable Heavy Operational Repair Squadron Engineers
- RET, Ret, (Ret) – Designations for retired military personnel, typically following the service designation in a title, e.g., Col USAF (Ret)
- RF – Radio frequency
- RFF – Request [F]or Forces (initiated by Army)
- RHIP – "Rank Has Its Privileges"
- RIF – Reduction In Force
- RIP – Report on Individual Personnel
- RNLTD – Report No Later Than Date
- ROAD – Retired On Active Duty
- RON – Remain overnight
- ROTC – Reserve Officers' Training Corps
- RPA – Remotely Piloted Aircraft
- RQG – Rescue Group
- RQS – Rescue Squadron (formerly ARS)
- RQW – Rescue Wing
- RTB – Return To Base
- RTIC – Real Time In the Cockpit
- RS – Reconnaissance Squadron
- RW – Reconnaissance Wing

== S ==
- SAASS – School of Advanced Air and Space Studies
- SABC – Self Aid Buddy Care
- SAC – Strategic Air Command (disestablished MAJCOM)
- SAF/SECAF – Secretary of the Air Force
- SAM – Surface to Air Missile
- SAMSO – Space and Missile Systems Organization
- SAPR – Sexual Assault Prevention and Response
- SARC – Sexual Assault Response Coordinator
- SATCOM – Satellite Communications
- SAV – Staff Assistance Visit
- SBIRS – Space-Based Infrared System
- SCOD – Static Close Out Date
- SDF – Standard Deployment Folder
- SEAD – Suppression of Enemy Air Defenses (pronounced "seed")
- SEADS – Southeast Air Defense Sector
- SEI – Special Experience Identifier
- Secret Squirrel stuff – Material classified above secret or special compartmentalized information
- Senior – Informal shortening for Senior Master Sergeant
- SEPCOR – Separate Correspondence
- SERE – Survival, Evasion, Resistance and Escape
- SF – Security Forces
- SF – Space Force
- SF – Special Forces
- SFS – Security Forces Squadron
- Sgt – Sergeant; former enlisted pay grade E-4 from 1976 to 1991, now designated as SrA
- Shirt – A unit first sergeant
- Short – Close to a PCS date or retirement
- Sierra Hotel (SH) – Shit Hot
- SIGINT – Signals Intelligence
- SIPR – Secret Internet Protocol
- SKT – Specialty Knowledge Test
- Slick Sleeve – Nickname for an Airman Basic (owing to the absence of rank insignia on an individual's sleeve)
- SLUF – Short Little Ugly Fucker (derogatory nickname for the LTV A-7 Corsair II)
- SME – Subject Matter Expert
- SMSgt – Senior Master Sergeant, enlisted pay grade E-8
- SNAFU – Situation Normal All Fucked Up
- SNCO – Senior Non-commissioned Officer; enlisted pay grades E-7, E-8 and E-9
- SNCOA – Senior Non-commissioned Officer Academy
- Snacko – A highly underestimated, mission critical position held most often by newly reported Lieutenants in a flying squadron. Doing well at the Snacko position will prompt one for a laudable career. Failing at such a job will often entail severe ridicule and, if necessary, replacement and retraining by the flying squadron.
- Snuffy – Generic term given to any Airmen of lower rank. "And here came Airman Snuffy late to the party as usual."
- SOP – Standard Operating Procedure
- SOPS – Space Operations Squadron
- SOS – Squadron Officer School
- SOS – Special Operations Squadron
- SOW – Special Operations Wing
- SOWT – Special Operations Weather Technician
- Spark Chaser – Nickname for aircraft maintenance personnel dealing with electronic, non-mechanical systems
- Spirit Mission – A good-natured act, commonly in the form of a prank, banner, or...re-acquisition...of a person/thing, to show pride for a group of individuals. Usually harmless.
- Sq – Squadron
- SrA – Senior Airman; enlisted pay grade E-4
- SRC – Solid Rock Cafe (new as of 2011, located at Sheppard AFB, TX – unofficial, used by officers as well as students)
- SRT – Security Response Team
- SSgt – Staff Sergeant; enlisted pay grade E-5
- SST – Supervisor Safety Training
- Staff – Informal shortening for Staff Sergeant
- STEP – Stripe Through Exceptional Performance
- Stick Actuator – Pilot
- Stink Bug – Nickname for the F-117 Nighthawk
- Strike Eagle – Name of the F-15E Strike Eagle
- STS – Special Tactics Squadron
- sUAS – Small Unmanned Aircraft System
- SURF – Single Uniform Request Format
- SVS – Services Squadron
- SW – Space Wing
- SWA – Southwest Asia
- SWAG – Scientific Wild-Ass Guess
- SWO – Staff Weather Officer | Squadron Weapons Officer

== T ==
- T&A – Test and Acceptance
- TAC – Tactical Air Command (disestablished MAJCOM)
- TAC-P – Tactical Air Control Party
- TACAN – Tactical Air Navigation
- TACON – Tactical Control
- TAFCSD – Total Active Federal Commission Service Date
- TAFMSD – Total Active Federal Military Service Date
- TAG (AG) – The Adjutant General
- Tail-End Charlie – Person bringing up the rear of a formation or a tail gunner
- TAP – Transition Assistance Program
- TBA – Training Business Area
- TCNO – Time Compliance Network Order
- TCTO – Time Compliance Technical Order
- TDY – Temporary Duty; analogous to Temporary Additional Duty (TAD / TEMADD) in USN, USMC and USCG
- Tech – Informal shortening of Technical Sergeant
- TFCSD – Total Federal Commissioned Service to Date
- TFI – Total Force Integration
- TGP – Targeting Pod
- TIG – The Inspector General
- TLAR – That Looks About Right
- TLF – Temporary Living Facility
- TMO – Traffic Management Office
- TO – Technical Order
- TOT – Time Over Target
- TP - Temporary Procedure
- TP - Training Procedure
- Tracking – Reference to offensive avionics on combat aircraft. Following and understanding the subject at hand. (IE: "I need this done yesterday, Airman. Are you tracking?")
- TRF – Tactical Response Force
- TRG – Training Group
- TRS – Training Squadron
- TRW – Training Wing
- TSgt – Technical Sergeant; enlisted pay grade E-6
- TST – Time-Sensitive Target
- TTP – Tactics, Techniques, and Procedures
- TU – Tango Uniform, slang for 'tits up'.

== U ==
- UAS – unmanned aircraft system
- UAV – unmanned aerial vehicle
- UCI – unit compliance inspection
- UCR – unsatisfactory condition report
- UCSOT – Undergraduate Combat Systems Officer Training
- UHT – Undergraduate Helicopter Pilot Training
- UIF – unfavorable information file
- ULN – unit line number
- UMD – unit manpower document
- UNT – Undergraduate Navigator Training (superseded by UCSOT)
- UNWT – Undergraduate Network Warfare Training
- UPT – Undergraduate Pilot Training (superseded by ENJJPT, JSUPT and UHT)
- USAF – United States Air Force
- USAFA – United States Air Force Academy
- USAFE – United States Air Forces in Europe
- USAFEC – United States Air Force Expeditionary Center
- USAFR – United States Air Force Reserve
- USAFWC – United States Air Force Warfare Center

== V ==
- VAQ – visiting airman quarters
- VFR – visual flight rules
- Viper – nickname for the F-16 Fighting Falcon
- VML – vulnerable to move list
- vMPF – virtual military personnel flight
- VOQ – visiting officer quarters
- VOR – VHF omnidirectional range
- V/R – virtual regards / very respectfully (closing salutation)
- vRED – virtual record of emergency data
- VSP – voluntary separation pay

== W ==
- WAC — Weapons Academics Course
- Warthog – Fairchild Republic A-10 Thunderbolt II
- WADS – Western Air Defense Sector
- WAF – Women in the Air Force
- WAG – Wild Ass Guess
- WAPS – Weighted Airman Promotion System
- WASP – Women Airforce Service Pilots
- WC – wing chaplain
- WG – wing
- WIC – weapons instructor course
- WIT – wing inspection team
- Winchester – out of ammo
- WOWWAJAA – with out weapons we are just another airline
- WRM – war reserve material
- WRT – with regard to / with reference to
- WSA – weapons storage area
- WSO – weapon systems officer
- WWM – Wing Weapons Manager
- WWO - Wing Weapons Officer
- WX – weather

== X ==
- X-plane – experimental aircraft
- XB3 – disposable item

== Y ==
- Y-plane – prototype aircraft

== Z ==
- Zero – officer
- Zoo – nickname for the Air Force Academy
- Zoomie – nickname for an Air Force Academy graduate or cadet

== See also ==
- List of acronyms
- List of U.S. government and military acronyms
- List of U.S. Marine Corps acronyms and expressions
- List of U.S. Navy acronyms
