= List of U.S. government and military acronyms =

List of initialisms, acronyms ("words made from parts of other words, pronounceable"), and other abbreviations used by the government and the military of the United States. Note that this list is intended to be specific to the United States government and military—other nations will have their own acronyms.

== 0–9 ==
- 0K – Zero Killed (pronounced OK, as the expression that everything is okay)
- 1LT – First Lieutenant (U.S. Army) (USMC uses "1stLt" and USAF uses "1st Lt")
- 2LT – Second Lieutenant (U.S. Army) (USMC uses "2ndLt" and USAF uses "2d Lt")
- 2IC – Second In Command
- 1SG – First Sergeant (E-8 Army)
- 777 – (Pronounced triple 7) Refers to the M777 howitzer, a towed 155 mm artillery weapon. It succeeded the M198 howitzer in the United States Marine Corps and United States Army in 2005. The M777 is also used by the ground forces of Australia, Canada, India, Saudi Arabia, and Ukraine. It made its combat debut in the War in Afghanistan.

== A ==
- A – Analog
- A1C – Airman First Class (USAF E-3)
- A2C2 – Army Airspace Command And Control
- A-3 – (Operations Directorate (COMAFFOR))
- A-5 – (Plans Directorate (COMAFFOR))
- AA – Anti-Aircraft
- AA – Armed Forces America
- AA – Assembly Area
- AA – Assessment Agent
- AA – Avenue Of Approach
- AAA – Army Audit Agency
- AAA – Antiaircraft Artillery
- AAA – Arrival And Assembly Area
- AAA – Assign Alternate Area
- AAAD – Airborne Anti-Armor Defense
- AAAS – Amphibious Aviation Assault Ship
- AABB – American Association of Blood Banks
- AABWS – Amphibious Assault Bulk Water System
- AAC – Activity Address Code
- AACG – Arrival Airfield Control Group
- AADC – Area Air Defense Commander
- AADP – Area Air Defense Plan
- AA&E – Arms, Ammunition, And Explosives
- AAEC – Aeromedical Evacuation Control Team
- AAFC – Australian Air Force Cadets (Australia)
- AAFES – Army and Air Force Exchange Service
- AAFIF – Automated Air Facility Information File
- AAFS – Amphibious Assault Fuel System
- AAFSF – Amphibious Assault Fuel Supply Facility
- AAGS – Army Air-Ground System
- AAI – Air-To-Air Interface
- AAM – Air-To-Air Missile
- AAMDC – US Army Air And Missile Defense Command
- AAO – Approved Acquisition Objective
- AAOE – Arrival And Assembly Operations Element
- AAOG – Arrival And Assembly Operations Group
- AAP – Allied Administrative Publication
- AAP – Assign Alternate Parent
- AAR – After Action Report
- AAR – After Action Review
- AAS – Army Apprentice School (Australia)
- AAST – Aeromedical Evacuation Administrative Support Team
- AAT – Automatic Analog Test
- AAT – Aviation Advisory Team
- AAU – Analog Applique Unit
- AAV – Amphibious Assault Vehicle
- AAW – Antiair Warfare
- AB – Airbase
- AB – Airman Basic (USAF E-1)
- ABCA – American, British, Canadian, Australian Armies Program
- ABCS – Army Battle Command System
- ABD – Airbase Defense
- ABU – Airman Battle Uniform (U.S. Air Force)
- ABV – Assault Breacher Vehicle (U.S. Army)
- ABFC – Advanced Base Functional Component
- ACU – Army Combat Uniform (U.S. Army)
- ADOS – Active Duty, Operational Support
- ADSW – Active Duty, Special Work
- AE – Armed Forces Europe
- AEW&C – Airborne Early Warning And Control
- AFI – Awaiting Further Instruction/Air Force Instruction (requirement guide)
- AFMC – Armed Forces Medical College
- AFOQT – Air Force Officer Qualifying Test
- AFOSI – United States Air Force Office of Special Investigations
- AFSC – Air Force Specialty Code
- AHA – Ammunition Holding Area
- AIM – Airborne Intercept Missile (U.S. Military)
- AIP - Assignment Incentive Pay
- AIPD – Army Institute For Professional Development
- AIS – Automated Information System
- AIT – Advanced Individual Training (U.S. Army)
- Amn – Airman (USAF E-2)
- ALCON – All Concerned (U.S. Military)
- AMU – Aircraft Maintenance Unit
- AMXG – Aircraft Maintenance Group
- AMXS – Aircraft Maintenance Squadron
- ANG – Air National Guard (USAF)
- AOC – Air Operations Center
- AOL – Absent Over Leave (U.S. Navy)
- AO – Area Of Operations
- AOR – Area of responsibility
- A&P – Administrative And Personnel
- AP – Armed Forces Pacific
- AP – Armor-Piercing
- APC – Armored Personnel Carrier
- APFSDS – Armor-Piercing Fin-Stabilized Discarding Sabot
- APFT – Army Physical Fitness Test (U.S. Army)
- APFU – Army Physical Fitness Uniform (U.S. Army)
- APO – Army Post Office; See Also FPO
- APPN – Appropriation Number (U.S. Military)
- APRT – Army Physical Readiness Test (U.S. Army)
- ARCENT/TUSA – US Army Central/HQ Third US Army (TUSA)
- ARPANET – Advanced Research Projects Agency Network (e.g., 1969 to 1989; antecedent of the information superhighway; now DARPA)
- ARM – Anti-Radar Missile
- ARM – Anti-Radiation Missile
- ARMS – Automated Recruit Management System (U.S. Military)
- ARMS – Aviation Resource Management System (USAF)
- ARNG – Army National Guard (U.S. Army)
- ARS – Air Refueling Store
- ART – Alarm Response Team (USAF)
- ARVN – Army Of The Republic Of (South) Viet Nam (U.S. Military)
- ASA – Ammunition Supply Activity
- ASAP – Army Substance Abuse Program (U.S. Military)
- ASAP – As Soon As Possible
- ASEAN – Association Of South East Asian Nations
- ASM – Air-to-Surface Missile
- ASCM – Anti-Ship Cruise Missile
- ASROC – Anti-Submarine ROCket
- ASP – Ammunition Supply Point
- ASV – Anti-Surface Vessel (airborne radar)
- ASVAB – Armed Services Vocational Aptitude Battery
- ASW – Anti-Submarine Warfare
- ATC – Air Training Corps
- ATC – Air Traffic Control
- ATFU – Ate The Fuck Up (not squared away)
- ATO – Air Tasking Order (USAF)
- ATO – Antiterrorism Officer
- ATP – Ammunition Transfer Point
- ATRRS – Army Training Requirements And Resources System
- AWACS – Airborne Warning and Control System
- AWOL – Absent Without Leave

== B ==
- BAH – Basic Allowance for Housing
- BAMCIS – Begin planning, Arrange recon, Make the plan, Complete the plan, Issue the order, Supervise (U.S. Marine Corps five paragraph order)
- BAR – Browning Automatic Rifle
- BAS - Basic Allowance for Subsistence
- BAU – Behavioral Analysis Unit
- BCD – Battlefield Coordination Detachment
- BCD – Bad Conduct Discharge (aka Big Chicken Dinner)
- BCG – Birth Control Glasses (U.S. military slang)
- BCT – Basic Combat Training (U.S. Army)
- BCT – Brigade Combat Team
- BDA – Bomb Damage Assessment or Battle Damage Assessment
- BDE – Brigade (U.S. Army)
- BDF – Barbados Defence Force (Barbados)
- BDU – Battle Dress Uniform (U.S. military)
- Be – Beriev (Russian)
- BEA – Budget Execution Authority (U.S. Navy)
- BEQ – Batchelor Enlisted Quarters (U.S. military)
- BFT – Blue Force Tracker (U.S. military)
- BG – Bodyguard
- BGHR – By God He's Right (U.S. military)
- BLUF – Bottom Line Up Front (U.S. military)
- BMNT – Begin Morning Nautical Twilight (U.S. Army)
- BMOW – Boatswain's Mate Of The Watch (U.S. Coast Guard)
- BN – Battalion (U.S. Army)
- BOHICA – Bend Over Here It Comes Again (U.S. military slang)
- BRAC – Base Realignment And Closure
- BRAT (American) – Born Raised And Transferred (American usage, refers to dependent children of military personnel) Usually pronounced "Military Brat" (Or "Air Force BRAT", or Army "Brat", Navy "Brat" etc.).
- BRAT (British) – British Regiment Attached Traveler (British military usage, may have been the original usage, which was later adapted to the American military: Means "child that travels with a soldier"), or "Born, Raised and Trapped". Usually pronounced "Military Brat" or "Base Brat".
- BUB – Battle Update Brief
- BVR – Beyond Visual Range (USAF)
- BX – Base Exchange (USAF)
- BZ – spoken "Bravo Zulu", meaning "congratulations, job well done"

== C ==
- C1 – Command
- C2 – Command And Control
- C3 – Command Control And Communication
- C4ISTAR – Command, Control, Communication, Computers; Intelligence, Surveillance, Target Acquisition, And Recognition
- C6ISR – Command, Control, Communications, Computers, Cyber-defense and Combat systems, and Intelligence, Surveillance, Reconnaissance
- CAC – Common Access Card (U.S. DoD, pron. "cac")
- CAG – Commander, Air Group (U.S. Navy, pron. "cag")
- CAG – Civil Affairs Group. Term used for military members assigned to assist civilian governments with restoring infrastructure (All U.S. branches, pron. "cag")
- CAGE – Commercial and Government Entity
- CALL – Center for Army Lessons Learned
- CAP - Combat Air Patrol
- CAP - Civil Air Patrol
- CAPT – Captain (U.S. Navy, USCG O-6)
- Capt – Captain (USMC O-3)
- CPT – Captain (U.S. Army, USAF O-3)
- CAS – Close Air Support
- CASEX – Coordinated Anti-Submarine EXercise
- CASEVAC – Casualty Evacuation
- CAT – Combat Application Tourniquets
- CBRN – Chemical Biological Radiological Nuclear
- CBU – Cluster Bomb Unit
- CCD - Camouflage, Concealment, and Detection
- CCIP – Continually Calculated Impact Point (USAF/USMC Aviation)
- CCIR – Commanders Critical Information Requirements
- CCP – Casualty Collection Point
- CCRP – Continually Calculated Release Point (USAF/USMC Aviation)
- CDAT – Computerized Dumb Ass Tanker (M1 Abrams Crewmen)
- CDD – Capabilities Development Document
- CDIAC – Carbon Dioxide Information Analysis Center
- CDRUSPACOM – Commander United States Pacific Command
- CENTCOM – Central Command (U.S. Military)
- CF – Cluster Fuck (always pronounced phonetically "Charlie Foxtrot")
- CHU – Containerized Housing Unit
- Chief – Chief Warrant Officer
- CIA – Central Intelligence Agency
- CIB – Combat Infantry Badge
- CIC – Command Intelligence Center (U.S. Navy)
- CINCLANT – Commander-in-chief, Atlantic Forces (U.S. Navy before 2002)
- CINCLANTFLT – Commander-in-chief, Atlantic Fleet (U.S. Navy before 2002)
- CINCPAC – Commander-in-chief, Pacific Forces (U.S. Navy before 2002)
- CIV – Civilian, performing work as an employee for the Department of Defense
- CIWS – Close-In Weapon System
- CJOTUS – Chief Justice of the United States
- CMB – Combat Medical Badge
- CMSgt – Chief Master Sergeant (USAF E-9; highest AF enlisted rank)
- CMSAF – Chief Master Sergeant of the Air Force (USAF E-9 – Senior Enlisted Member)
- CO – Commanding Officer
- COA – Course of Action
- COB – Chief Of the Boat (Chief Petty Officer in charge of the Boat usually a Master Chief (USN Submariner Terminology))
- CoB – Close of Business (End of the duty day)
- COCOM – Combatant Commander
- CODELS – Congressional Delegations
- COL – Colonel
- COMINT – Communications Intelligence
- COMPACFLT – Commander, Pacific Fleet (U.S. Navy)
- COMSEC – Communication Security
- CONUS – Continental United States (U.S. military, pron. "cone-us")
- CONUSA – Continental United States Army (numbered Armies of U.S. military)
- CORDS – Civil Operations and Revolutionary Development Support (U.S. military, Vietnam era)
- COP – Combat Out Post
- CoS – Chief of Staff
- COT – Commissioned Officer Training
- CPL – Corporal (U.S. Army and Marine Corps E-4)
- CPO – Chief Petty Officer (USCG/USN E-7)
- CPT – Captain (U.S. Army O-3)
- CP – Check Point (Usually Numbered i.e. "CP1")
- CPX – Command Post Exercise
- CQB – Close Quarters Battle
- CRC – CONUS Replacement Center (a military processing center at Fort Benning, Georgia, U.S.)
- CSM – Command Sergeant Major (U.S. Army E-9 highest Army enlisted rank))
- CSAR – Combat Search And Rescue
- CT – Counter-terrorism Team
- CTA – Common Table of Allowances
- CTR – Close Target Reconnaissance
- CUB – Commander Update Brief
- CVN – Nuclear-powered Aircraft Carrier (NOTE: the V comes from the expression "heavier than air flying machine")
- CWO – Chief Warrant Officer
- CZN – Nuclear-powered Airship Carrier (NOTE: the Z comes from the use of the word Zeppelin although non-Zeppelin airships would also be transported on a CZN)

== D ==
- DA – Defence Attaché
- DAC – Department of the Army Civilian
- DAGO – Department of the Army General Officer
- DAGR – Defense Advanced GPS Receiver
- DARPA – Defense Advanced Research Projects Agency (U.S. Military)
- DASA – Division Artillery Security Area
- DAT – Dumb Ass Tanker
- DC3 – Department of Defense Cyber Crime Center
- DCAA – Defense Contract Audit Agency
- DCMA – Defense Contract Management Agency
- DD-214 – Certificate of Release or Discharge from Active Duty
- DEROS – Date Estimated Return From Overseas
- DEVGRU – United States Naval Special Warfare Development Group
- DFAC – Dining Facility (U.S. Military)
- DFAS – Defense Finance and Accounting Service (U.S. Military)
- DIA – Defense Intelligence Agency
- DIFM - Due In From Maintenance
- DINFAC – Dining Facility (U.S. Military)
- DISA – Defense Information Systems Agency
- DLA – Defense Logistics Agency
- DLB – Dead Letter Box
- DMDC – Defense Manpower Data Center
- DME – Depot Maintenance Enterprise (U.S. Military)
- DMEA – Defense Microelectronics Activity
- DMS – Defense Message System (U.S. Military)
- DMZ – Demilitarized Zone
- DOA – Dead on Arrival
- DoDAAC – Department of Defense Activity Address Code (U.S. Military)
- DoDAF – Department of Defense Architecture Framework (U.S. Military)
- DoDIC – Department of Defense Identification Code (U.S. Military)
- DOEHRS – Defense Occupational and Environmental Health Readiness System (U.S. Military)
- DOP – Drop-Off Point
- DPMs – Disruptive Pattern Material
- DRT – Dead Right There; wounded in such a way as to indicate immediate and/or unavoidable death; often used as a sarcastic form of the civilian acronym DOA (Dead On Arrival)
- DTO – Daily Tasking Order
- DTRA – Defense Threat Reduction agency
- DZ – Drop Zone

== E ==
- E-4 - Specialist 4 or later Specialist (U. S. Army rank)
- E&E – Escape and Evade
- EA – Electronic Attack
- EAS - End of Active Service
- ECP – Entry Control Point
- EDCSA – Effective Date of Change of Strength Accountability (obsolete for U. S. Army)
- EFP - Explosively Formed Penetrator
- EHRS – Electronic Health Records (Software)
- EI – Engineering and Installation
- EIS – Engineering and Installation Squadron, Environmental Impact Statement
- EIB – Expert Infantry Badge
- EI SIT – Engineering and Installation Site Implementation Team
- EKIA – Enemy Killed in Action
- ELINT – Electronic Intelligence
- EMI – Extra Military Instruction
- ENS – Ensign (U.S. Navy junior officer rank, O-1)
- EOD – Explosive Ordnance Disposal
- EOS – End of Service
- EP – Electronic Protection
- EPR − Enlisted Performance Report
- EPW – Enemy Prisoner of War
- ERV – Emergency Rendezvous
- ESSENCE – Electronic Surveillance System for Early Notification of Community-based Epidemics (U.S. Military)
- ETA – Estimated time of arrival
- ETS – Expiration Term of Service
- EUCOM – European Command (U.S. Military)
- EW – Electronic Warfare (comprises EA, EP)
- Exfil – Exfiltration (Opposite of infiltration; exiting undetected)

== F ==
- FA – Field Artillery
- FAK – First Aid Kit
- FAR – Federal Acquisition Regulation
- FBCB2 – Force XXI Battlefield Command Brigade and Below
- FBI – Federal Bureau of Investigation
- FEBA – Forward Edge of the Battle Area
- FFE – Fire for effect
- FIDO – Fire Direction Officer
- FIGMO – Fuck It, Got My Orders
- FIST – Fire Support Team
- FISTer – Member of a Fire Support Team
- FIST-V – Fire Support Team Vehicle
- FISINT – Foreign Instrumentation Signals Intelligence
- FISHDO – Fuck It, Shit Happens, Drive On
- FitRep – Fitness Report
- FLOT – Forward Line of Troops
- FLOTUS – First Lady of the United States (U.S. – see POTUS)
- FM – Field Marshal; differently, but more commonly "Field Manual"
- FMC – Fully Mission Capable
- FMTV – Family of Medium Tactical Vehicles (U.S. Army)
- FNG – Fucking New Guy
- FO – Forward Observer
- FO – Foxtrot Oscar (i.e. Fuck Off) (US/UK Forces)
- FOB – Forward Operating Base
- FOD – Foreign Object Damage (U.S.)
- FOD – Foreign Object Debris (U.S.)
- FOI – Field of Imaging
- FPO – Fleet Post Office; See also APO
- FRACU – Flame-Resistant Army Combat Uniform (U.S. Army)
- FSA – Force Structure Allowance
- FSTE – Foreign Service Tour Extension
- FTG – Fleet Training Group (U.S. Navy) or Fuck The Guard (U.S. Coast Guard)
- FTUS – Full Time Unit Specialist
- FUBAR – Fouled Up Beyond All Recognition, Fucked Up Beyond All Repair or Fucked Up Beyond All Recognition
- FYSA – For Your Situational Awareness
- FYI – For Your Information

== G ==
- G1 – General Staff Level office for Personnel and Manpower (Division and Above)
- G2 – General Staff Level office for Military Intelligence (Division and Above)
- G3 – General Staff Level office for Operations and Plans (Division and Above)
- G4 – General Staff Level office for Logistics (Division and Above)
- G5 – General Staff Level office for Military/Civil Affairs (Division and Above)
- G6 – General Staff Level office for Signal and Communication (Division and Above)
- G7 – General Staff Level office for Training and Exercises (Division and Above)
- G8 – General Staff Level office for Force Development and Analysis (Division and Above)
- G9 – General Staff Level office for Civil Operations (Division and Above)
- GBU – Guided Bomb Unit
- GEN – General
- GI – Government Issue
- GIG – Global Information Grid
- GIGO – Garbage In Garbage Out
- GM – Gone Mersault
- GO – General Officer
- GOCO – Government owned, contractor operated
- GPMG – General Purpose Machine Gun
- GPS – Global Positioning System
- GS – General Schedule

== H ==
- HAAMS – High Altitude Airdrop Missions
- HAHO – High Altitude High Opening
- HALO – High Altitude Low Opening (Airborne)
- HAU –
- HBL – Holiday Block Leave (U.S. Army)
- HE – High Explosive
- HEAT – High-Explosive Anti-Tank
- HEP – High Explosive, Plastic (U.S. usage for HESH)
- HESH – High-explosive squash head (British anti-tank and anti-fortification round)
- HIMARS – High Mobility Artillery Rocket System
- HMAS – His Majesty's Australian Ship (Australia)
- HMCS – His Majesty's Canadian Ship (Canada)
- HMFIC – Head Motherfucker In Charge – colloquialism for the highest-ranking person present; more commonly used by NCO's than by officers (United States Armed Forces)
- HMMWV – High Mobility Multipurpose Wheeled Vehicle (U.S. Military) (Pronounced Humvee)
- HMNZS – His Majesty's New Zealand Ship (New Zealand)
- HMS – Hans Majestäts Skepp (His Majesty's ship, Sweden)
- HMS – His Majesty's Ship (Royal Navies such as British Royal Navy) (Her Majesty's Ship if Queen)
- Hr.Ms – His/Her Dutch Majesty's Ship (Dutch Royal Navy ship)
- HOMSEC – Homeland Security
- HRAP – Hometown Recruiter Assistance Program
- HQ – Headquarters
- HHB – Headquarters and Headquarters Battery (artillery units)
- HHC – Headquarters and Headquarters Company
- HHT – Headquarters and Headquarters Troop (cavalry units)
- HUMINT – Human Intelligence (intelligence gathering)
- HVI – High Value Individual
- HVT – High Value Target
- HYT – High Year Tenure

== I ==
- IAF – Indian Air Force
- IAF – Israeli Air Force
- IAVA – Information Assurance Vulnerability Alert (U.S. Military)
- ICBM – Intercontinental ballistic missile
- ICE – Individual carrying equipment, e.g. all-purpose lightweight individual carrying equipment (ALICE)
- ID – IDentification
- IED – Improvised explosive device
- IFAK – Individual First aid kit
- IFF – Identification Friend or Foe
- IFF – Introduction to Fighter Fundamentals (USAF)
- IG – Inspector General (U.S. Military)
- IFV – Infantry Fighting Vehicle
- Il – Ilyushin, Russian aircraft company
- IN – Infantry
- INSCOM – United States Army Intelligence and Security Command
- Interpol – International Criminal Police Organization
- IOC – Initial Operational Capability
- ISO – Inter School Course
- ISR – Intelligence, Surveillance, and Reconnaissance
- IYAAYAS – "If You Ain't AMMO, You Ain't Shit"

== J ==
- JA – Judge Advocate [General]
- JAFO – Just Another Fucking Observer
- JAG – Judge Advocate General
- JDAM – Joint Direct Attack Munition
- JSF – Joint Strike Fighter program
- JATO – Jet-assisted Take Off
- JETDS – Joint Electronics Type Designation System
- JNN – Joint Network Node (U.S. Army)
- JSAM – Joint Service Achievement Medal
- JSTARS – Joint Surveillance Target Attack Radar System
- JSOC – Joint Special Operations Command
- JTF – Joint Task Force
- JTAC - Joint Terminal Attack Controller
- JEEP – "Just Enough Essential Parts"

== K ==
- KATUSA – Korean Augmentation to the United States Army (also known by lower ranking U.S. soldiers as "Koreans Aggravating The U.S. Army")
- KIA – Killed In Action
- KFOR – Kosovo Force
- KISS – Keep It Simple, Stupid
- KO – Contracting Officer, Navy
- KP – Kitchen Police or Kitchen Patrol
- KBO – Keep Buggering On

== L ==
- LAAD – Low Altitude Air Defense
- LAAT – Low Altitude Assault Transport
- LAV – Light Armored Vehicle
- LCDR – Lieutenant Commander (U.S. Navy)
- LCpl – Lance Corporal (U.S. Marines)
- LES – Leave and Earnings Statement
- LIC – Low Intensity Conflict
- LP – Listening Post
- LP/OP – Listening Post Observation Post
- LPC – Leather Personnel Carrier (boot)
- LGOP – Little Group Of Paratroopers
- LMTV – Light Medium Tactical Vehicle (U.S. Army)
- LPO – Leading Petty Officer (U.S. Navy)
- LT – Lieutenant
- LTC or Lt Col or LtCol– Lieutenant Colonel (U.S. Army, U.S. Marine Corps, U.S. Air Force)
- LTG or Lt Gen or LtGen – Lieutenant General (U.S. Army, U.S. Marine Corps, U.S. Air Force)
- LTJG – Lieutenant, Junior Grade (U.S. Navy)
- LRIP – Low-Rate Initial Production
- LUP – Lying-Up Point
- LZ – Landing Zone

== M ==
- MAC – Modular Ammunition Company
- MACV/SOG – Military Assistance Command Vietnam / Studies and Observation Group
- MAJ – Major
- MAP – Modular Ammunition Platoon
- MARCORSYSCOM – MARine CORps SYStems COMmand (U.S. Military)
- MARCENT Marine Corps Central Command
- MARFORRES – MARine FORces REServe (U.S. Marine Corps)
- MARSOC – Marine Corps Forces Special Operations Command
- MATP – Modular Ammunition Transfer Point
- MAV – Micro Air Vehicle
- MAW – Maximum Allowable Weight
- MBT – Main battle tank
- MC 326/2 – ″NATO Medical Support Principles and Policies″, approved by Military Committee, second revision.
- MCCS – Marine Corps Community Services (also known by the humorous backronym "Marine Corps Crime Syndicate")
- MCEN – Marine Corps Enterprise Network (U.S. Military)
- MCEITS – Marine Corps Enterprise Information Technology Service (U.S. Military)
- MCPO – Master Chief Petty Officer (USCG/USN E-9)
- MCPOCG – Master Chief Petty Officer of the Coast Guard (U.S. Coast Guard E-9 – Senior Enlisted Coast Guardsman)
- MedEvac – Medical evacuation
- MFA – Ministry of Foreign Affairs
- MG – Machine gun
- MG – Major general
- MI – Military Intelligence
- Mi – Mil Moscow Helicopter Plant (Russian)
- MIA – Missing in action
- MICAP – Mission Impaired Capability Awaiting Parts
- MICV – Mechanized Infantry Combat Vehicle ( an Infantry fighting vehicle)
- MiG – Mikoyan-Gurevich (Russian)
- MILCON – Military Construction
- MK – Mark
- MK – Machinery Technician (U.S. Coast Guard rating)
- MLRS – Multiple Launch Rocket System
- MMFD – Miles and Miles of F...ing Desert (unofficial report in Gulf War)
- MOA – Military Operating Area (USAF Airspace)
- MOAB – Massive Ordnance Air Blast bomb, also known as "Mother Of All Bombs".
- MOAC – Mother of All Coffee (Green Bean Coffee)
- MOB – Main Operating Base
- MOBCOM – MOBile COMmand
- MOPP – Mission Oriented Protective Posture
- MOS – Military Occupation Specialty
- MOUT – Military Operations in Urban Terrain
- MPDS – Military Planning Data Allowance
- MRAP – Mine-Resistant Ambush Protected
- MRE – Meal, Ready-to-Eat (U.S. Military)
- MRX – Mission Rehearsal Exercise
- MSG – Master Sergeant (US Army E-8) / Marine Security Guard
- MSgt – Master Sergeant (USAF E-7)
- MSO – Marine Safety Office (U.S. Coast Guard)
- MTOE – Modified Table Of Organizational Equipment
- MTS+ – Movement Tracking System Plus
- MTV – Medium Tactical Vehicle (U.S. Army)
- MSDC+ – Marine Science Diving Club (Diving Club Of Hasanudin University)
- MSR – Main Supply Route
- MSR – Major Supply Route
- MWR – Morale Welfare Recreation

== N ==
- NAFTA – North American Free Trade Agreement
- NAS – Naval Air Station
- NATO – North Atlantic Treaty Organization
- NCIS – Naval Criminal Investigative Service (U.S. Navy)
- NAVAIR – Naval Air Systems Command
- NAVCENT – Naval Forces Central Command (U.S. Navy)
- NAVOCEANO – Naval Oceanographic Office
- NBACC – National Biodefense Analysis and Countermeasures Center
- NCI – National Cancer Institute
- NCO – Non-Commissioned Officer
- NCOIC – Non-Commissioned Officer in Charge
- NCOES – Non-Commissioned Officer Education System
- ND – Negligent Discharge
- NDP – Night Defensive Position
- NEFF – New Equipment Fielding Facility
- NIBC National Interagency Biodefense Campus
- NICBR – National Interagency Confederation for Biological Research
- NLT – No Later Than
- NMC – Not Mission Capable
- NME – Non-Mission Essential
- NMCI – Naval Marine Corps Intranet (U.S. Navy)
- NNMSA – Non-Nuclear Munitions Storage Area
- NOC – Non Official Cover
- NORAD – North American Aerospace Defense Command
- NPDES – National Pollutant Discharge Elimination System
- NS – Network Services
- NSA – National Security Agency
- NSW – Naval Special Warfare
- NSWDG – Naval Special Warfare Development Group
- NUB – Non-Useful Body / Nuclear Unqualified Bitch (U.S. Nuclear Navy)

== O ==
- OBE – Overcome/Overrun By Events
- OCONUS – Outside Continental United States
- OCP – Operational Camouflage Pattern (U.S. Army, U.S. Air Force)
- OCS – Officer Candidate School
- ODA – Operational Detachment-Alpha (the standard 12-man team composed of U.S. Army Special Forces operators)
- ODU – Operational Dress Uniform (U.S. Coast Guard)
- OIC – Officer in Charge
- OIG – Office of Inspector General
- OM – On the Move (Normally just spelled out Oscar Mike)
- O&M, MC – Operations & Maintenance, Marine Corps (U.S. Navy)
- O&M, N – Operations & Maintenance, Navy (U.S. Navy)
- OODA – Observe, Orient, Decide, and Act
- OP – Observation Post
- OPFOR – Opposing Force or Opposition Force
- OPR – Officer Performance Report
- OPT – Operational Planning Team
- ORM – Operational Risk Management
- Oscar – Man overboard
- OSM – Oh Shit Moment (U.S. Marine Corps)
- OSP – On Site Procurement
- OSP – Orbital Services Program
- OSUT - One Station Unit Training
- OPORD – Operations Order
- OPSEC – Operations Security
- OTF – Out There Flapping (Airborne)
- OTS – Officer Training School
- OTV – Outer Tactical Vest

== P ==
- PACOM – Pacific Command
- PACAF – Pacific Air Forces
- PAQ – PALACE Acquire
- PCS – Permanent Change of Station
- PDS – Permanent Duty Station (U.S. Military)
- PDT – Pre-Deployment Training
- PE – Plastic Explosive
- PFC – Private First Class (U.S. Military)
- PFM – Pure Fuckin Magic (U.S. Military)
- PFN - Preparation For Notification
- PFT – Physical Fitness Test
- PII – Personally Identifiable Information or Personal Identity Information
- PL – Platoon Leader (U.S. Army)
- PLL – Prescribed Load List (U.S. Army)
- PLT – Platoon (U.S. Army)
- PMC – Partially Mission Capable
- PME – Professional Military Education
- PMS – Planned Maintenance Schedule (U.S. Navy)
- PNG – Passive Night Goggles
- PO – Post Office
- PO1 – Petty Officer 1st Class (USCG/USN E-6)
- PO2 – Petty Officer 2nd Class (USCG/USN E-5)
- PO3 – Petty Officer 3rd Class (USCG/USN E-4)
- POBCAK – Problem Occurs Between Chair And Keyboard
- POL – Petroleum Oil & Lubricants (U.S. Air Force)
- POC – Point Of Contact
- POTUS – President of the United States
- POG – Person Other than Grunt (All non-combat arms job fields i.e. any MOS or CMF other than infantry, cavalry, armor, and artillery; among infantrymen, refers to anyone other than infantry or special forces)
- POW – Prisoner Of War
- POV – Privately Owned Vehicle
- PPG – PT Parade Games
- PPPPPPP, (the Seven P's) – Proper Prior Planning Prevents Pitifully (colloquially "Piss") Poor Performance
- PRP – Personnel Reliability Program
- PRP – Pretty Retarded Program
- PRT – Provincial Reconstruction Team
- PRT – Physical Readiness Training (U.S. Army)
- PT – Physical Training
- PTB – Powers That Be
- PV2 – Private 2nd class (U.S. Army E-2)
- PVT – Private (U.S. Army and Marine Corps E-1)
- PX – Post Exchange (U.S. Army)

== R ==
- RAAF – Royal Australian Air Force
- RAF – Royal Air Force (UK)
- RAN – Royal Australian Navy
- RATELO – Radiotelephone Operator
- RATO – Rocket Assisted Take Off
- RCSC – Royal Canadian Sea Cadets (Canada)
- REMF – Rear Echelon Mother Fucker
- RFL – Response Force Leader
- RMC – Royal Military College of Canada
- RN – Royal Navy (UK)
- ROE – Rules Of Engagement
- ROMA Data, Right Out of My Ass Data. Unverifiable created data (different from SWAG)
- ROWPU – Reverse Osmosis Water Purification Unit
- RNZAF – Royal New Zealand Air Force
- ROZ – Restricted Operating Zone
- RP – Rendezvous point
- RPG – Rocket-propelled grenade
- RPM – Rounds per minute (Rate of fire)
- RS – RatShit (Australia – related to U.S. – Unserviceable)
- RSS – Regional Security System (Caribbean)
- RTB – Return To Base
- RUBA – Rotational Unit Bivouac Area
- RV – rendezvous
- RTO – Radiotelephone Operator

== S ==
- SA – Seaman Apprentice (USCG/USN E-2)
- SA – Situation Awareness
- SAAS – Standard Army Ammunition System (U.S. Army)
- SAM – Surface-to-Air Missile
- SAR – Search and Rescue (U.S. Coast Guard)
- SARS – Search and Rescue Swimmer
- SARSS – Standard Army Retail Supply System (U.S. Army)
- SAS – Special Air Service (British special forces)
- SBS – Special Boat Service (British special forces)
- SCIF – Sensitive Compartmented Information Facility
- SCO – Squadron Commander (Squadron as used in the U.S. Army Regimental System)
- SCOTUS – Supreme Court of the United States
- SCPO – Senior Chief Petty Officer (USCG/USN E-8)
- SD – "Status Destroyed" or "Salty Dog". (Equipment that is written off as unrepairable and unsalvageable. )
- SDD – Solution Delivery Division (Military Health)
- SEAC – Senior Enlisted Advisor to the Chairman of the Joint Chiefs of Staff
- SFAS – Special Forces Assessment Selection
- SEAL – Sea, Air and Land (U.S. Navy SEALs)
- SECDEF - Abbreviation for "Secretary of Defense"
- SECWAR - "Secretary of War" (Change of name of Secretary of Defense by Trump Executive Order, but not recognized by current U. S. law)
- SERE – Survival, Evasion, Resistance and Escape
- SFC – Sergeant First Class (U.S. Army E-7)
- SFOD-A – United States Army Special Forces Operational Detachment Alpha – U.S. Special Forces team (see ODA)
- SFOD-B – Special Forces Operational Detachment Bravo – U.S. Special Forces support group
- SFOD-C – Special Forces Operational Detachment Charlie – U.S. Special Forces command group
- SFOD-D – Special Forces Operational Detachment Delta (U.S. Army counter-terrorism unit)
- SGM – Sergeant Major (U.S. Army E-9 – Sometimes referred to as Staff Sergeant Major)
- SGT – Sergeant (U.S. Army E-5) (U.S. Marines uses Sgt)
- SHORAD – Short Range Air Defense
- SITREP – Situation Report
- SJA – Staff Judge Advocate
- SLAM – Standoff Land Attack Missile
- SLBM – Submarine-launched ballistic missile
- SLOTUS – Second Lady of the United States
- SMA – Sergeant Major of the Army (U.S. Army E-9 – Senior Enlisted Member)
- SMEAC – Situation Mission Execution Admin/logistics Command/signal (U.S. Marine Corps basic knowledge)
- SMSgt – Senior Master Sergeant (USAF E-8)
- SN – Seaman (USCG/USN E-3)
- SNAFU – Situation Normal: All Fucked/Fouled Up
- SOCCENT – Special Operations Command Central
- SOCOM – United States Special Operations Command
- SOFA – Status of Forces Agreement
- SOL – Shit Out of Luck (U.S. Army)
- SOLJWF – Shit Out of Luck and Jolly Well Fucked (U.S. Marines)
- SOP – Standard Operating Procedures
- SOS – Save Our Ship, a naval variant of distress signal, comparable to Air Force "Mayday"
- SOS – Shit On a Shingle, or creamed chipped beef on toast.
- SPO - Stupid People in Ohio (contractor slang for AF program offices, normally located at Wright-Patterson AFB in Ohio)
- SPC – Specialist (U.S. Army E-4)
- SPORTS – Slap, Pull, Observe, Release, Tap, Shoot.
- SR – Seaman Recruit (USCG/USN E-1)
- SrA – Senior Airman (USAF E-4)
- SRBM – Short Range Ballistic Missile
- SRR – Special Reconnaissance Regiment (British special Forces)
- SSBN – Nuclear-Powered Ballistic missile submarine
- SSDD – Same Shit Different Day
- SSDDBS – Same Shit Different Day Bigger Shovel
- SSG – Staff Sergeant (U.S. Army E-6)
- SSGN – Nuclear-Powered Cruise missile submarine
- SSgt – Staff Sergeant (U.S. Air Force E-5) (U.S. Marines E-6)
- SSN – Nuclear-powered attack submarine
- STOVL – Short Takeoff, Vertical Landing
- SUSFU – Situation Unchanged, Still Fucked Up
- SWAG – Scientific Wild Ass Guess
- SWAK – Sealed With A Kiss

== T ==
- TACP – Tactical Air Control Party (USAF)
- TAD – Temporary Additional Duty (U.S. Military)
- TAO – Tactical Action Officer (U.S. Military)
- TBD – To Be Determined
- TC3 – Tactical Combat Casualty Care
- TCCC – Tactical Combat Casualty Care
- TDPFO – Temporary Duty Pending Further Orders (U.S. Military)
- TDY – Temporary Duty (U.S. Military)
- TEL – Transporter Erector Launcher
- TF – Task Force
- TFOA – Things Falling Off Aircraft
- TG6 – Task Group 6 (group designation for NZ SAS – NZ Army)
- TOC – Tactical Operations Center
- TIC – Troops In Contact
- TSgt – Technical Sergeant (USAF E-6)
- TU – Tits Up (dead, inoperable), a.k.a. "Tango Uniform"
- TARFU – Things Are Really Fucked Up, or Totally And Royally Fucked Up
- TRADOC- U.S. Army Training and Doctrine Command

== U ==
- UA – Unauthorized Absence
- UA - Urinalysis
- UAS – Unmanned Aerial System
- UAV – Unmanned Aerial Vehicle
- UCP – Universal Camouflage Pattern (U.S. Army)
- UCAV – Unmanned Combat Air Vehicle
- ULLS – Unit Level Logisitics System (U.S. Army)
- UMA – Unit Mobilization Assistor
- UN – United Nations
- US – Unserviceable
- USS – United States Ship
- USSS – United States Secret Service
- USAF – United States Air Force
- USAFA – the United States Air Force Academy at Colorado Springs, Colorado
- USAFE – United States Air Forces in Europe
- USAMRICD – United States Army Medical Research Institute of Chemical Defense
- USAMRIID – United States Army Medical Research Institute of Infectious Disease
- USAMRMC – United States Army Medical Research and Materiél Command
- USAMRAA – United States Army Medical Research Acquisition Activity
- USA PATRIOT Act – Uniting and Strengthening America by Providing Appropriate Tools Required to Intercept and Obstruct Terrorism Act
- USAREC – U.S. Army Recruiting Command
- USAREUR – U.S. Army European Command
- USASOC – U.S. Army Special Operations Command
- USFK - United States Forces Korea
- USCG – United States Coast Guard
- USCGC – United States Coast Guard Cutter
- USMA – United States Military Academy (U.S. Army) at West Point, New York
- USMC – United States Marine Corps
- USN – United States Navy
- USNA – United States Naval Academy (U.S. Navy) at Annapolis, Maryland
- USO – United Service Organizations (U.S. Military)
- USR – Unit Status Report
- UUV – Unmanned Underwater Vehicle
- UXB – Unexploded Bomb (bomb disposal; British)
- UXO – Unexploded Ordnance

== V ==
- VBIED – Vehicle-Borne Improvised Explosive Device
- VDM – Visual Distinguishing Mark
- VFD – Volunteer Fire Department
- VFR – Volunteer Fire and Rescue (or in Aviation Visual Flight Rules)
- VPOTUS – Vice President of the United States
- V/r - Very respectfully (equivalent of 'Sincerely', sometimes used as signoff in civil service correspondence)

== W ==
- WIA – Wounded In Action
- WO1 – Warrant Officer 1
- WSA – Weapons Storage Area
- WMD – Weapons of Mass Destruction
- WILCO – Will Comply
- WCS – Worst Case Scenario
- WORM – War operating ready material

== X ==
- XO – Executive Officer

== Y ==
- YGBSM – You Gotta Be Shitting Me

== See also ==
- Military slang
- List of acronyms
- List of government and military acronyms
- List of U.S. Air Force acronyms and expressions
- List of U.S. Marine Corps acronyms and expressions
- List of U.S. Navy acronyms
