= Chalk (military) =

Military term for a group of paratroopers that deploys from a single aircraft

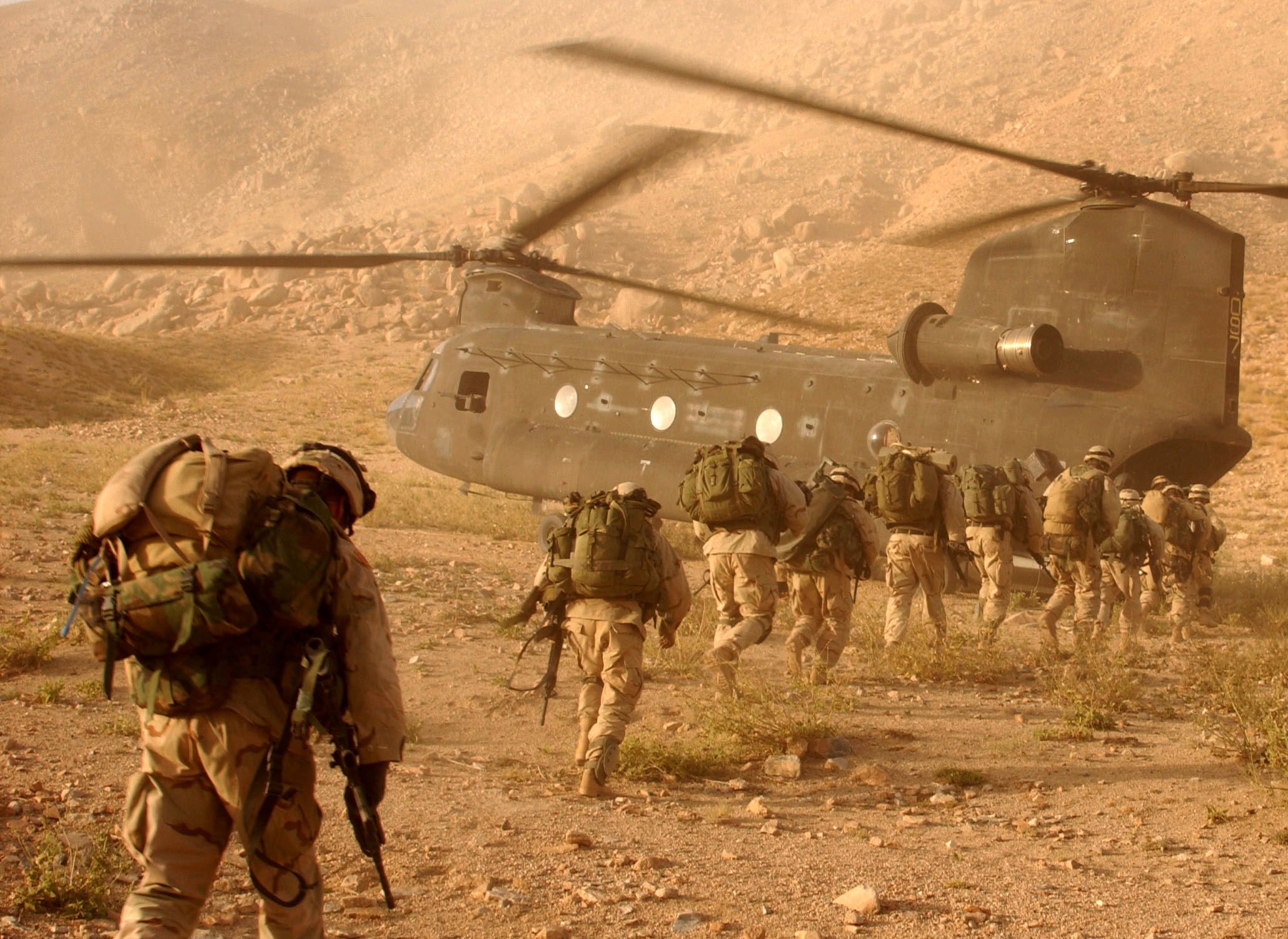
A chalk loading onto a helicopter

In military terminology, a chalk is a group of paratroopers or other soldiers that deploy from a single aircraft. A chalk often corresponds to a platoon-sized unit for air assault operations, or a company-minus-sized organization for airborne operations. For air transport operations, it can consist of up to a company-plus-sized unit. Frequently, a load of paratroopers in one aircraft, prepared for a drop, is also referred to as a stick.

The term was first coined in World War II for airborne troops during Operation Overlord, the Allied invasion of Europe. The aircraft flight-number was placed on the troops' backs with chalk. It was later used during the Vietnam War, when it was common practice to number with chalk the sides of the helicopters involved in an operation.

In current military terminology a "chalk" may mean either passengers or equipment loaded as cargo. Equipment is loaded in the order it will be needed on arrival. It is not uncommon for planners to refer to aircraft loads by their chalk number, "You are in chalk five but your gear will be shipped in chalk two."

In the Army 75th Ranger Regiment they use the term chalk. A chalk can be made of a Company or as small as a four man fire team. It takes at least four men to make a fire team so that is the smallest number of men that can be called a chalk.

In some instances, when a convoy clearance cannot be obtained, a convoy will be divided up into different groups with four or fewer trucks in each group. Those groups will be referred to as chalk one, chalk two, chalk three, etc. This is to avoid having to obtain a convoy clearance while still maintaining power in numbers while traveling.

== See also ==
- List of government and military acronyms
  - List of U.S. government and military acronyms
    - List of United States Marine Corps acronyms and expressions
    - List of U.S. Navy acronyms and expressions
    - List of U.S. Air Force acronyms and expressions
- List of established military terms
- List of military slang terms
