= Air Education Training Command Collaboration Portal =

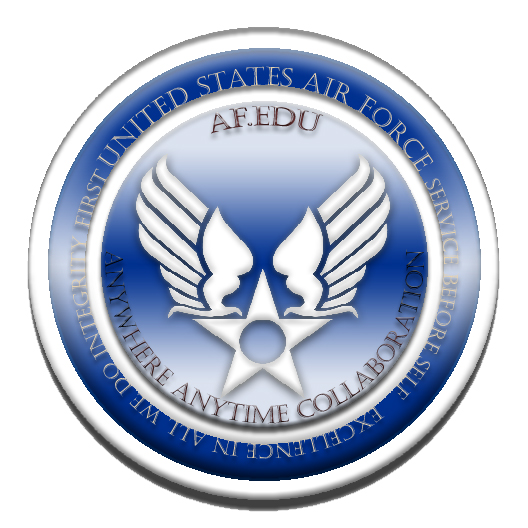
AETC Collaboration Portal Logo.

The Air Education Training Command Collaboration Portal (ACP) provides collaboration services to the United States Air Force academic institutions and select training organizations. The Air Collaboration Portal has evolved and now provides other collaboration components such as blogs, wikis, and instant messaging to the U.S. Air Force.

== History and mission ==
AETC Collaboration Portal was established in 2007 as a single enterprise environment that enhances cyber security to the Air Force ".mil" network. The Air Collaboration Portal creates a collaboration environment to enhance training, education, and research for the United States Air Force. The mission statement is "Establish and maintain one “af.edu” domain, without exposing the af.mil network to security risks." The Air Collaboration Portal benefits Air Force users worldwide.

The Air Collaboration Portal provides the following benefits:

- Reduces security risks caused by non-compliant computers on the .mil network
- Gives faculty and staff a less restrictive environment to meet mission requirements
- Enhances software approval process
- Provides network services to foreign researchers
- Federates with commercial instant messaging (Google, MSN, AOL) and e-mail
- Provides mission acceptable access through the proxy.

== Users ==
AETC Collaboration Portal's stated goal is to enable Air Force personnel, both airmen and civilian contractors access to information anywhere, anytime. Authorized users include the following:

- Active Air Force
- DoD Civilian
- Air Force Reserves
- Future airmen
- Air National Guard
- ROTC cadets
- National Guard
- U.S. Military Academy cadets
- Foreign officers (attached to U.S. Air Force)
- Contractors

== Capabilities and features ==
AETC Collaboration Portal offers multiple enterprise collaboration features and capabilities to the Air Force.

Features and capabilities include:

- Web-based e-mail
- Instant messaging
- Federated enterprise search
- Blogs
- Wikis
- Forums
- Web-based document repositories
- Single sign on (SSO)
- Team collaboration websites
- Directory and item level security

== Accomplishments and supported units ==
AETC Collaboration Portal is innovative in scope and concept for collaboration, research, and training. They can be credited with providing highly mobile Civilian Institute students and faculty with e-mail addresses, web portals, and instant messaging capabilities. It also enhances professional development, and cultural awareness.

The Air Collaboration Portal supports the following organizations:

- Air Education Training Command
- Keesler Online
- Air University
- Air Force Culture and Language Center
- Air Force Academy
- Air Force Institute of Technology
- Airman Advancement Division
- Air Force Special Operations Command

== Enterprise Service Desk ==
Assistance provided via:

- E-mail
- Telephone
- Knowledge base
- Chat
- Web
