= Military slang =

Colloquial military terminology used by military personnel

Military slang is an array of colloquial terminology used commonly by military personnel, including slang which is unique to or originates with the armed forces. In English-speaking countries, it often takes the form of abbreviations/acronyms or derivations of the NATO Phonetic Alphabet, or otherwise incorporates aspects of formal military terms and concepts. Military slang is often used to reinforce or reflect (usually friendly and humorous) interservice rivalries.

== Acronym slang in the U.S. Military ==
A number of military slang terms are acronyms. Rick Atkinson ascribes the origin of SNAFU (Situation Normal, All Fucked Up), FUBAR (Fucked Up Beyond Any Repair or "All Recognition"), and a bevy of other terms to cynical GIs ridiculing the United States Army's penchant for acronyms.

Terms then end up being used in other industries as these GIs complete their services. For example, FUBAR evolved into Foobar as GIs coming home from World War II matriculated into Massachusetts Institute of Technology, with the first written use from a club at MIT called the Tech Model Railroad Club.

== See also ==
- List of U.S. government and military acronyms
  - List of U.S. Air Force acronyms and expressions
  - List of U.S. Marine Corps acronyms and expressions
  - List of U.S. Navy acronyms and expressions
- Army creole
- Grande Armée slang (French Army slang during the Napoleonic Wars)
- Voice procedure
- Junjiahua, also known as "military speech", a collection of scattered modern day Chinese dialects derived from the lingua franca of the Ming dynasty (1368–1644) military
- Internet slang
- Youth slang
