= Munitions Systems Specialist =

U.S. Air Force specialty

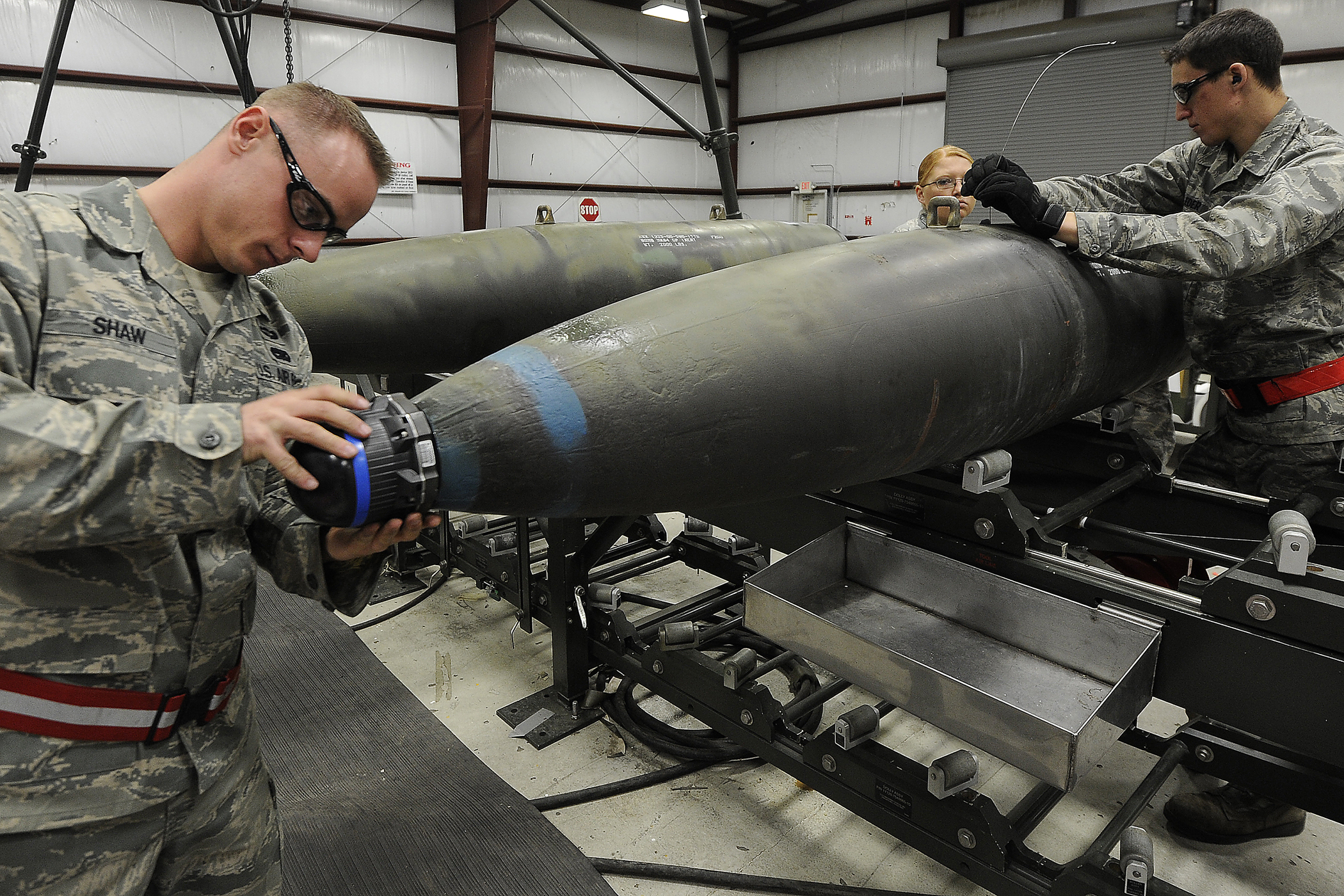
Munitions Systems specialists assigned to the 388th Munitions Squadron assemble an inert GBU-31 joint direct attack munition at Hill Air Force Base, Utah, 2011.

Munitions Systems specialists are enlisted airmen of the U.S. Air Force tasked with protecting, handling, storing, transporting, arming/disarming, and assembly of non-nuclear munitions. The Munitions Systems career field is commonly referred to by airmen as "AMMO".

== Air Force Specialty Code ==
The Air Force Specialty Code (AFSC) for Munitions Systems specialists is 2W0X1. Prior to 1993 it was 461X0. It is a part of the Maintenance/Logistics group within Air Force organizational structures. Although the maintenance group utilizes Air Force Instruction (AFI) 21-101 (Aerospace Equipment Maintenance Management) for guidance, the Munitions Flight will additionally reference DAFMAN 21-201 (Munitions Management).

- AFSCs
  - 2 Maintenance/Logistics
    - 2W Munitions & Weapons
      - 2W0X1 Munitions Systems
      - 2W1X1 Aircraft Armament Systems
      - 2W2X1 Nuclear Weapons

== Career Field description ==
External videos
- "2W0X1 Munitions Systems". Short Air National Guard film dated August 28, 2015, giving an overview of the Munitions Systems Specialist career.

Upon graduation from Air Force Basic Military Training at Lackland Air Force Base, San Antonio, Texas, airmen assigned to the field attend the 7-week Munitions Systems Apprentice Course at Sheppard Air Force Base, Texas. Upon graduation from technical training school, apprentices are sent to their assigned duty stations.

Ammo troops work primarily with weapons loaders. Various duties include shipping and receiving, assembling, testing, operating, protecting, inspecting, storing, and maintaining of all types of conventional munition systems. Additional duties include delivering munitions to the flightline where weapons troops will load them. Munitions Systems specialists also operate and maintain a wide variety of equipment and electronic gear, from pallet jacks, 40-foot (12 m) tractor-trailer combination vehicles, all-terrain 10,000 pound forklifts, and 100,000 pound forklifts. The Munitions Storage Area (MSA) can be responsible for munitions from small arms ammunition (for rifles and pistols) up to large-scale guided bombs. Active Duty, Reserve, and Air National Guard Munitions Systems specialists can be assigned any of a large number of military bases. Air Force bases that host non-combat aircraft or no aircraft, such as Randolph Air Force Base and Vance Air Force Base, utilize Air Force civil service personnel who are primarily made up of retired or prior service AMMO troops.
