= Airman basic =

United States Air Force rank

Airman Basic
- Country: United States
- Service branch: United States Air Force
- Abbreviation: AB
- Rank group: Enlisted
- NATO rank code: OR-1
- Pay grade: E-1
- Next higher rank: Airman (USAF)
- Equivalent ranks: Seaman recruit (Navy & USCG); Private (rank) (USA and USMC); Specialist 1 (USSF)

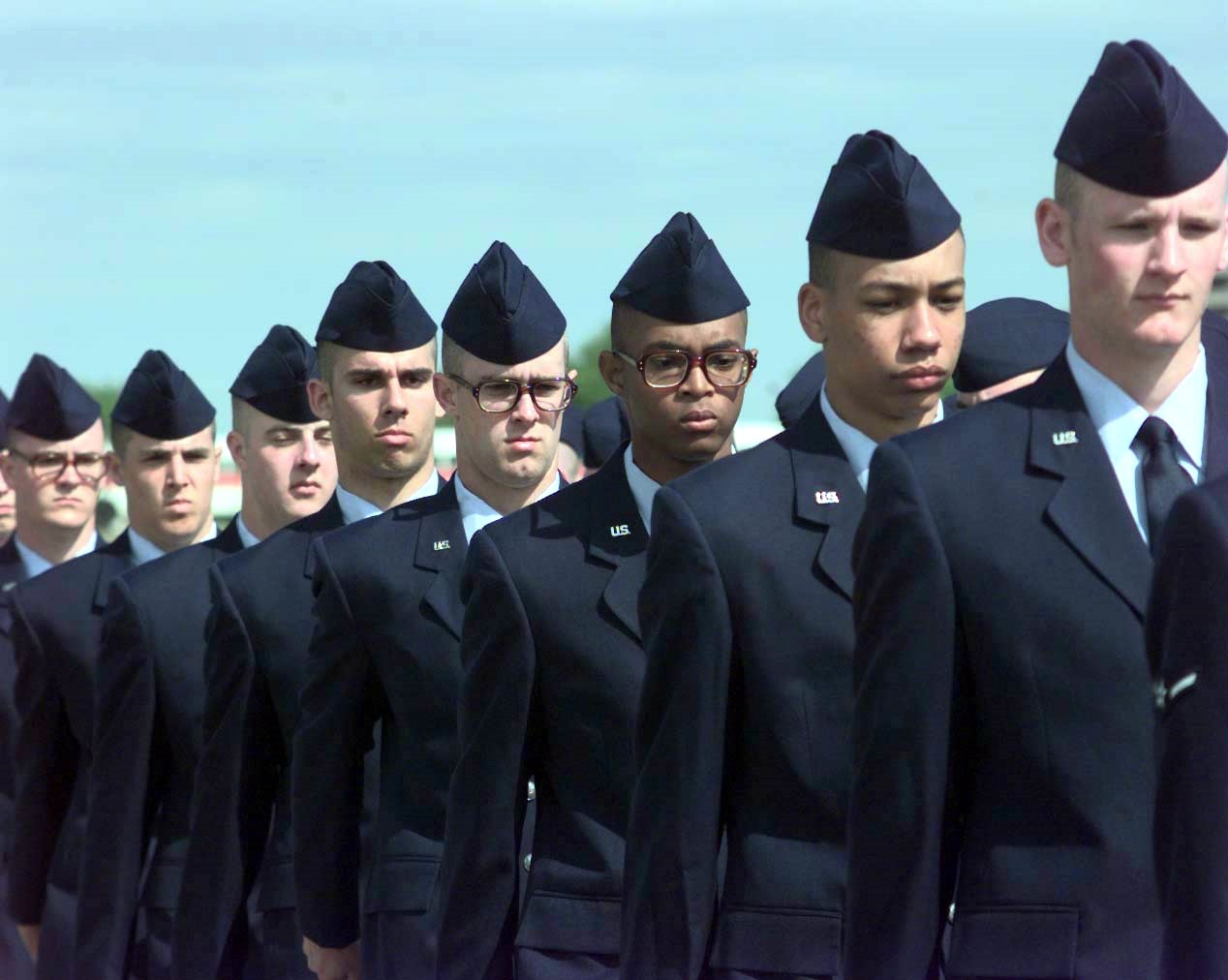
Airmen basic march in column formation as part of their graduation ceremony at Lackland Air Force Base in March 1999.

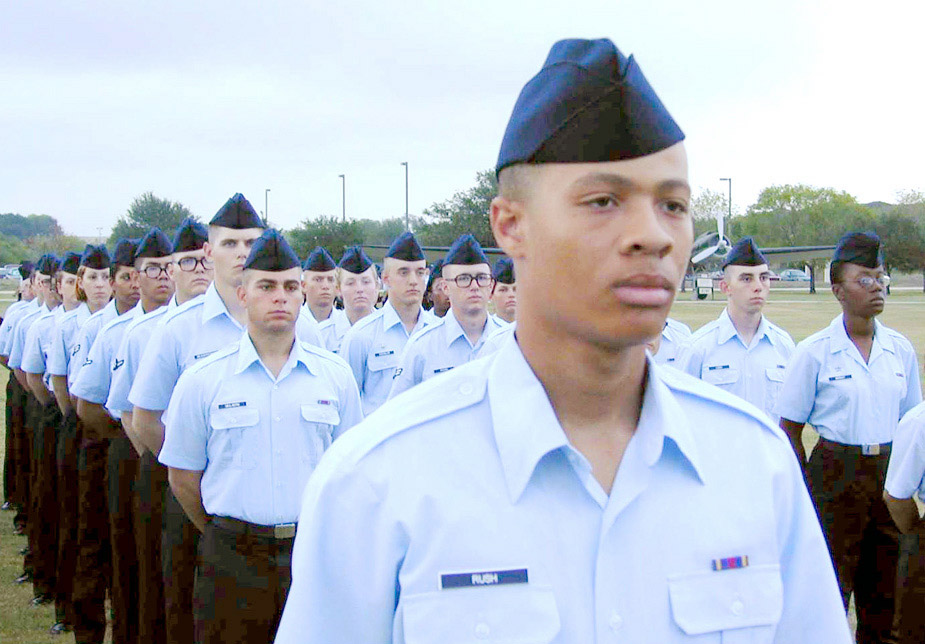
In October 2000, airmen basic stand in formation, awaiting graduation. An airman basic wears no rank insignia.

Airman basic (AB) is the lowest enlisted rank in the United States Air Force immediately below airman. The male form of rank designation also applies to women. The pay grade for airman basic is E-1.

As opposed to all other USAF enlisted and officer ranks, airman basic has no rank insignia affiliated. The lack of uniform insignia for airman basic is the reason for the nickname "slick-sleeve"; all other enlisted Air Force ranks wear stripes and chevrons on their uniform sleeves.

In accordance with Air Force Instruction (AFI) 36-2618, The Enlisted Force Structure, the term of address for an airman basic is "Airman Basic" or "Airman".

== History ==
When the U.S. Air Force was split from the U.S. Army on July 26, 1947, it inherited the U.S. Army's enlisted ranks; the lowest U.S. Air Force enlisted rank became "private" (falling immediately below private, E-2), which wore no rank insignia.

In March 1952, the Air Council and United States Air Force Chief of Staff General Hoyt Vandenberg adopted a number of changes to the U.S. Air Force enlisted rank structure that had been recommended by studies made in 1950 and 1951. On April 24, 1952, Air Force Regulation 39-36 was published, changing the name of the lowest enlisted U.S. Air Force rank to "basic airman"—whose holders still bore no insignia—immediately below the new "airman third class".

On February 5, 1959, the new Air Force regulation governing the titles of enlisted ranks was released; the only change being direction that the title for E-1 was changed from "basic airman" to "airman basic".

== Promotion from airman basic ==
Under normal circumstances, airmen basic are eligible for promotion to airman (E-2) after six months' time in grade (TIG). However, individuals enlisting for six years are promoted from AB to airman first class (A1C) upon completion of either technical training (or 20 weeks thereof) or the indoctrination course for combat control or pararescue.

== Demotion to airman basic ==
If an airman of E-2 or higher rank is court-martialed and convicted of an offense or crime, s/he may be demoted to airman basic, with or without being discharged (dishonorably or otherwise) from the service.

In accordance with AFI 36-2502, Airman Promotion Program, all promotions from AB require that an airman's immediate commanding officer approve the promotion in writing before he or she may assume it.

== See also ==
- United States Air Force enlisted rank insignia
- United States military pay – Money paid to members of the US military
