= Air Force Logistics Management Agency =

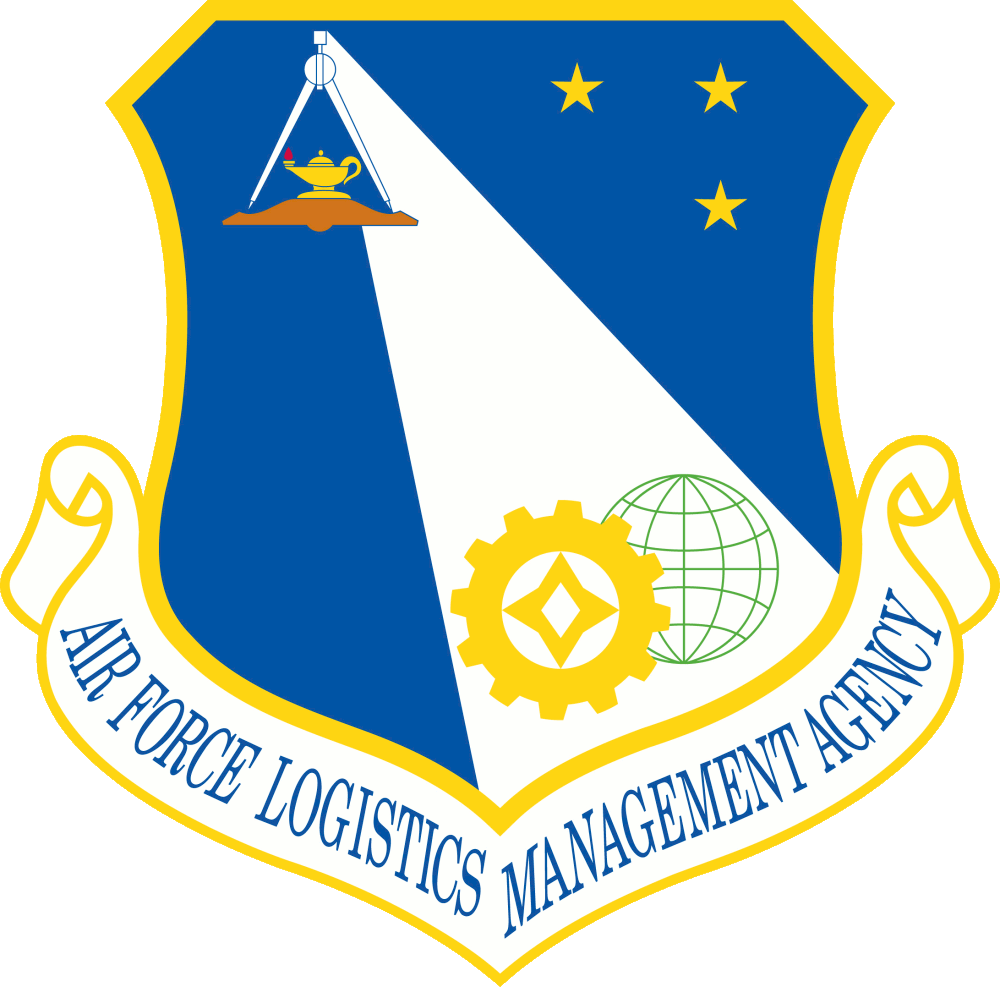
- Air Force Logistics Management Agency emblem
- Active: 1 October 1975 – 1 October 2012
- Country: United States
- Branch: United States Air Force
- Role: Logistics

The Air Force Logistics Management Agency improved agile combat support capabilities by generating enterprise supply chain solutions supporting logistics transformation through research, war games and literature. The agency supports Air Force enterprise logistics transformation by sustaining the Air Force supply chain architecture; producing solutions to logistics problems; designing new and improved concepts, methods and systems; and publishing the Air Force Journal of Logistics and other publications on logistics issues.

== History ==
In late 1975, the Air Force established the Air Force Logistics Management Center at Gunter Air Force Station, Alabama. It was created in response to a need to centrally manage logistics study improvement efforts and concentrate management emphasis on enhancing combat effectiveness. the center was renamed the Air Force Logistics Management Agency (AFLMA) in 1993. Its charter was to solve logistics problems. Since its inception, AFLMA has provided a continuing study, analysis, and development capability to the Air Force logistics community. Tackling and solving Air Force logistics problems remains the focus of the Agency today. The Agency has developed strong working relationships with RAND and the Logistics Management Institute. Additionally, the AFLMA has forged partnering and teaming efforts with a variety of other Air Force, public, and private sector organizations.
