= Company Grade Officers' Council =

The Company Grade Officers' Council (commonly known as the CGOC) is a national organization of US Air Force and US Space Force Company Grade Officers (Lieutenants and Captains). It is not an official military unit, but an association of junior military officers who volunteer their off-duty time to give back through professional development and community service. Each base or installation has its own local CGOC organization, which in turn falls under one of the four regional CGOCs (Western, Eastern, European, and Pacific), that are combined to form the National CGOC.

The National CGOC is led by a board of directors composed of elected CGOs from across the Air Force and Space Force and represents over 47,000 active duty, reserve, and guard lieutenants and captains. The current chairman and executive director is Captain Julian Gluck.
