= Army Substance Abuse Program =

The Army Substance Abuse Program is an anti-substance abuse program in the United States Army, operated by the Army Center for Substance Abuse Programs.

The program is governed by AR 600-85, MEDCOM Reg 40-51, ALARACT 062/2011, DA Pam 600-85, and the Employee Assistance Program (EAP). Army policy states that the program is to be supported by a soldier's entire chain of command, including the commander.

== Mission and objectives ==
The mission of the Army Center for Substance Abuse Programs (ACSAP) is to strengthen the overall fitness and effectiveness of the Army’s workforce, to conserve manpower, and to enhance the combat readiness of soldiers. The following are the objectives of the ACSAP:

- Increase individual fitness and overall unit readiness.
- Provide services which are proactive and responsive to the needs of the Army’s workforce and emphasize alcohol and other drug abuse deterrence, prevention, education, and rehabilitation.
- Implement alcohol and other drug risk reduction and prevention strategies that respond to potential problems before they jeopardize readiness, productivity, and careers.
- Restore to duty those substance-impaired soldiers who have the potential for continued military service.
- Provide effective alcohol and other drug abuse prevention and education at all levels of command, and encourage commanders to provide alcohol and drug-free leisure activities.
- Ensure all personnel assigned to ASAP staff are appropriately trained and experienced to accomplish their missions.
- Achieve maximum productivity and reduce absenteeism and attrition among civilian corps members by reducing the effects of the abuse of alcohol and other drugs.
- Improve readiness by extending services to the soldiers, civilian corps members, and family members.

== Concept and principles ==
The ASAP is a command program that emphasizes readiness and personal responsibility. The ultimate decision regarding separation or retention of abusers is the responsibility of the Soldier’s chain of command. The command role in substance abuse prevention, drug and alcohol testing, early ID of problems, rehabilitation, and administrative or judicial actions is essential. Commanders will ensure that all officials and supervisors support the ASAP. Proposals to provide ASAP services that deviate from procedures prescribed by this regulation must be approved by the Director, ASAP. Deviations in clinical issues also require approval of the Commander, U.S. Army Medical Command (USAMEDCOM). In either case, approval must be obtained before establishing alternative plans for services (as required for isolated or remote areas or special organizational structures).

The two overarching tenets of the ASAP are Prevention and Treatment.

Overarching tenets and supporting capabilities of ASAP

TENETS	CAPABILITY	DEFINITION
Prevention	Education and Training	Instruction for the Soldiers and other beneficiaries with increased knowledge, skills, and/or experience as the desired outcome.
Prevention	Deterrence	Action or threat of action to be taken in order to dissuade soldiers or government employees from abusing or misusing substances. The Army’s primary mechanism of deterrence is Random Drug Testing.
Prevention	Identification/Detection	The process of identifying soldiers and other beneficiaries as potential or actual substance abusers. This identification can be via self ID, command ID, drug testing ID, medical ID, investigation or apprehension ID.
Prevention	Referral	Modes by which Soldiers and other beneficiaries can access ASAP services. Modes are self-referral and command referral.
Treatment	Screening	An in-depth individual biopsychosocial evaluation interview to determine if soldiers and other beneficiaries need to be referred for treatment. This capability is a MEDCOM responsibility.
Prevention/Treatment	Targeted Intervention	An educational/motivational program which focuses on the adverse effects and consequences of alcohol and other drug abuse. The methods used by the Army are the Army Drug and Alcohol Prevention Training (ADAPT) program and “Prime for Life. All Soldiers and other beneficiaries screened for substance abuse issues will receive targeted intervention, whether they are enrolled in the program or not.
Treatment	Rehabilitation	Clinical intervention with the goal of returning soldiers and other beneficiaries to full duty or identify soldiers who are not able to be successfully rehabilitated. This capability is a MEDCOM responsibility.
Prevention	Risk Reduction	Compile, analyze, and assess behavioral risk and other data to identify trends and units with high-risk profiles. Provide systematic prevention and intervention methods and materials to commanders to eliminate or mitigate individual high-risk behaviors.

== Eligibility criteria ==
The ASAP services are authorized for personnel who are eligible to receive military medical services or are eligible for medical services under the Federal Civilian Employees Occupational Health Services Program. In addition to soldiers, eligibility includes;

1. United States (U.S.) citizen DOD civilian employees, to include both appropriated and non-appropriated fund employees.
2. Foreign national employees where status of forces agreements or other treaty arrangements provide for medical services.
3. Retired military personnel.
4. Family members of eligible personnel when they are eligible for medical care under the provisions of AR 40–400, (paragraphs 3–14 through 3–16.)
5. Members of the U.S. Navy, U.S. Marine Corps, U.S. Air Force, and U.S. Coast Guard when they are under the administrative jurisdiction of an Army commander who is subject to this regulation.
6. Non-uniformed outside continental United States (OCONUS) personnel who are eligible to receive military medical services.

When soldiers are under the administrative jurisdiction of another Service, they will comply with the alcohol and other drug program of that Service. All drug test results and records of referrals for counseling and rehabilitation will be reported through Army alcohol and drug abuse channels to the ACSAP.

When elements of the Army and another Service are so located that cost effectiveness, efficiency, and combat readiness can be achieved by combining facilities, the Service to receive the support will be responsible for initiating a local Memorandum of Understanding and/or Interservice Support Agreement (refer to DODI 4000.19).

Members of the Army National Guard (ARNG) and United States Army Reserve (USAR) who are not on AD are eligible to use ASAP services on a space/resource available basis.

== Similar Studies ==
A study to explore substance use and emotional distress in military members, from military to civilian life transition was conducted by Karen Derefinko. The study included multiple forms of substance use, including cigarettes, marijuana, illicit and prescription drug misuse. There was a disclaimer that there would be no repercussions for anything admitted in the study.

All participants were voluntary and were recruited through word of mouth by an initial 5 veterans who were chosen by the staff members of the study.

The eligibility requirements for this study was that the individuals had to serve for at least 12 months in an active duty branch and had to be separated from the military for at least 6 months. 80 veterans met the requirements and completed the survey.

The procedures of the study were simple, the veterans took a survey online, and were provided a gift card afterwards.

The findings of substance use were "graded" using a system 1-5, 1 = never, 2 = once a month or less, 3 = once a week, 4 = 2 to 3 times a week, and 5 = 4 to 5 times a week. The findings were separated between active duty use and use after separation.

The active duty use of alcohol was 91.5%, the active duty use of cigarettes was 40.7%, the active duty use of marijuana was 3.7%, the active duty use of hard drugs was 4.9%, the active duty use of prescription drugs was 11.1%

The post separation use of alcohol was 88.6%, the post separation use of cigarettes was 37.5%, the post separation use of marijuana was 26.2%, the post separation use of hard drugs was 11.4%, and the post separation use of prescription drugs was 15%.
