= Air Force Personnel Operations Agency =

U.S. Air Force field operating agency

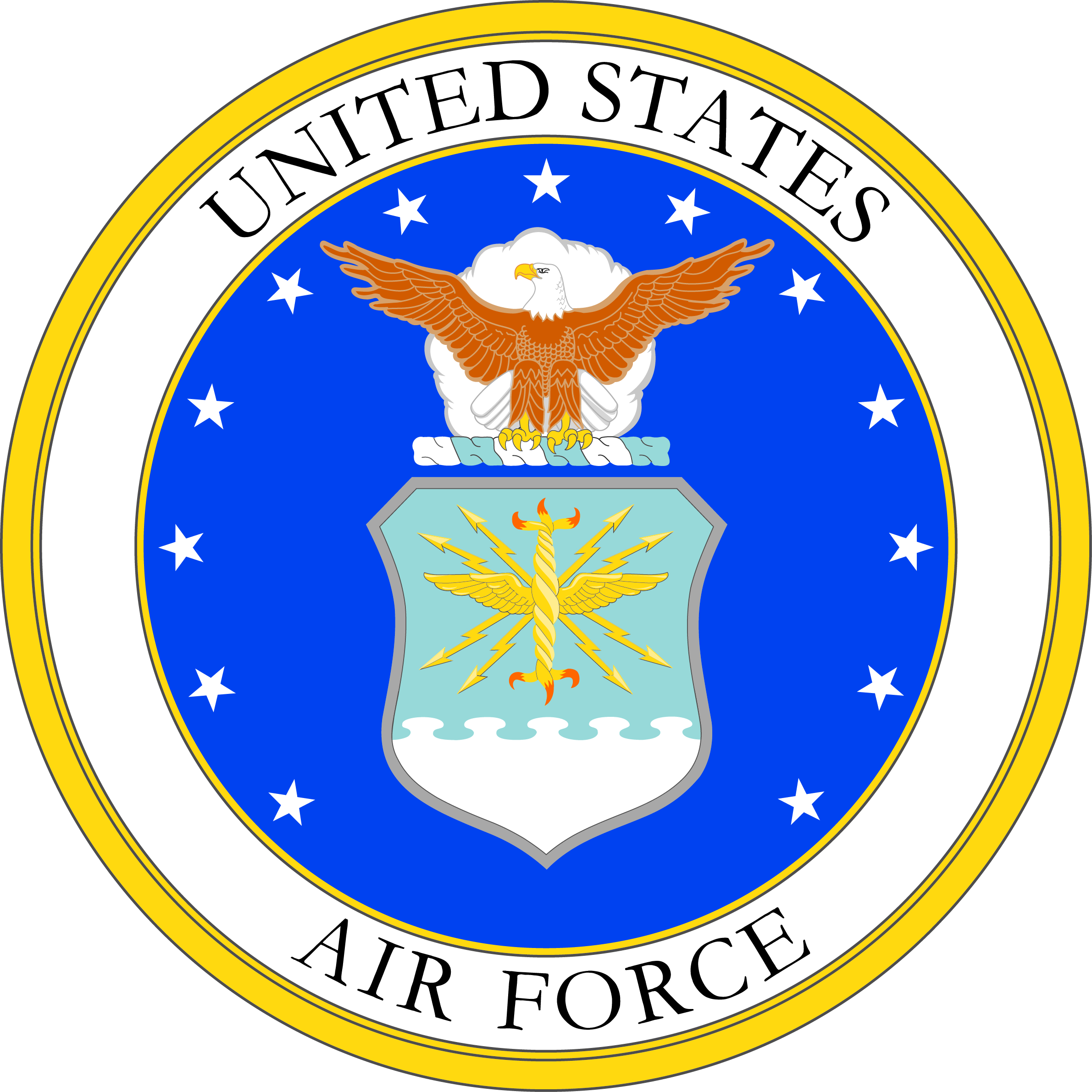
Air Force Personnel Operations Agency

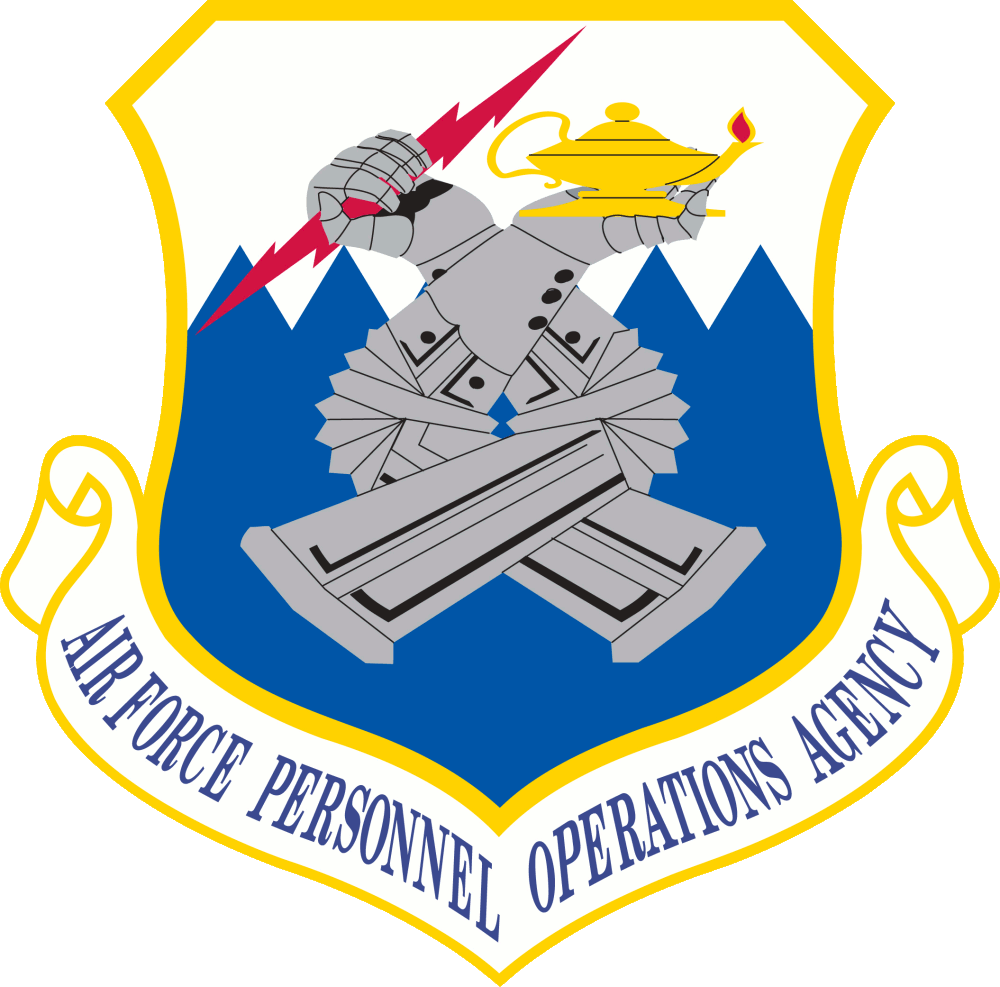
- Air Force Personnel Operations Agency emblem
- Active: 15 August 1993 – present
- Country: United States
- Branch: United States Air Force
- Part of: United States Air Force
- Garrison/HQ: San Antonio, Texas

The Air Force Personnel Operations Agency serves as the single Air Force focal point for submission and acceptance of total force human resources information technology requirements. It works with Air Force manpower, Personnel and Services (A1), the Air Force Personnel Center, the Air Reserve Personnel Center and other human resources customers to capture information technology systems requirements in support of the A1 enterprise. AFPOA documents those requirements to deliver streamlined and improved personnel services to commanders, managers, and Airmen. The agency also orchestrates final user acceptance testing of the resulting systems and computer applications to ensure they meet the needs of its customer.
