= Department of the Air Force Instruction =

A Department of the Air Force Instruction (DAFI) is a documented instruction for members of the United States Air Force and United States Space Force intended for use by active duty, guard, and reserve members, and associated civilians. It is one of many forms of directives published by the Air Force Departmental Publishing Office (AFDPO). In almost all cases, an Air Force Instruction is a form of a general order; and violation of the AFI by an Airman subject to it can be punished under the UCMJ Uniform Code of Military Justice. Previously they were named Air Force Instructions (AFIs), but most were renamed after the formation of the United States Space Force under the Department of the Air Force. The Space Force also has Space Force Instructions (SPFIs).

== Examples ==
Some examples of an Air Force Instruction are:

- AFI 11-202V3 General Flight Rules prescribes general flight rules for all USAF aircraft;
- DAFI 36-2903 Dress and Appearance of Air Force Personnel outlines Air Force uniform wear and grooming standards;

Air Force members are required to know, understand, and implement AFIs which apply to their duties and responsibilities.
