= Airman =

Member of a national armed force relating to aviation

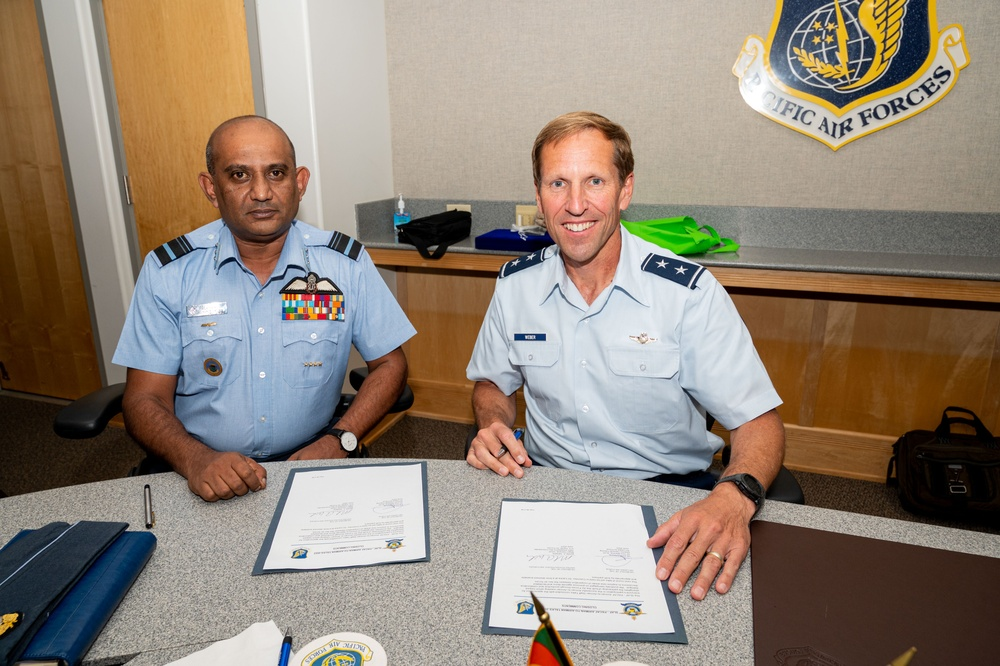
Leaders in the Sri Lanka Air Force and United States Air Force at a joint gathering called "Airman-to-Airman Talks"

An airman (plural airmen) is a member of an air force or air arm of a nation's military. In some services it can refer to any service member, equivalent to the term soldier or sailor, and in some it is also a specific enlisted rank. Both men and women with this rank are called airmen. Some services have replaced the term airman with the gender-neutral term aviator. Airman may also refer to civilian aircraft pilots, aircraft maintenance technicians. For example, the United States Federal Aviation Administration has used the term airman to refer to a number of aviation-related job titles in its civil aviation regulations. The term airwoman is occasionally used in both military and civilian contexts.

== Etymology and mainstream usage ==
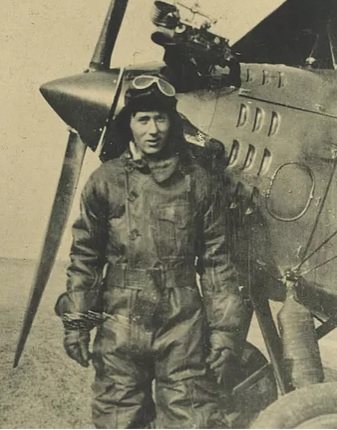
Airman from the United States

The English word airman was derived from aer, and man in Old English is a word for an individual who served roles in the air or took place in the sky during medieval times. In civilian aviation, the term airman is analogous to the term "sailor" in nautical usage. In 1873, "airman" was first mentioned in a former British monthly newspaper referred to as the Cassell's Magazine, written by John Cassel.

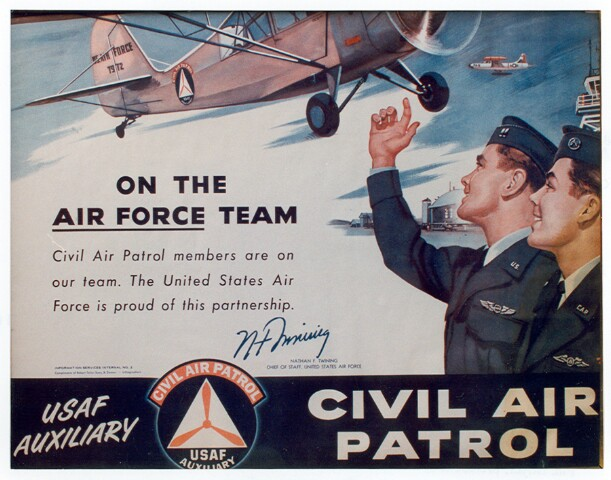
Civil Air Patrol poster

Today, "airman" is a term common throughout the world and particularly in the English speaking countries, "aviator" is used primarily in New Zealand and the United States, and "airwomen" formally in the United Kingdom. The term "airwomen" had a less-well documented early historical role, but in the modern world work at identical tasks and have obtained considerable respect for their achievements in aviation. "Airman" is also used by the Federal Aviation Administration.

== Airmen skills ==
Armed aviators in the sky flying during wartime can be more difficult than knowing how to operate all the crucial buttons and advanced systems, it requires critical training and time. And listening to air traffic controllers. It requires the basics of aviation and following orders. In many countries, the flight regulating body rules the sky whether military or not.

=== Physical skill ===
A military aviator is limited to their physical skill with the ability to turn maneuver and turn direction at a moment notice. For example, a Sikorsky UH-60 Blackhawk pilot serving under the Army Air Corps of the United Kingdom, British Army requirements can range from a mid thigh pull, and a medicine ball throw.

=== Mental skill ===
Preventing an emergency situation and preparing for the event of an emergency requires strict rules:

- Observing the environment for other aircraft traffic, commercial or foreign weather conditions, and other hazards
- Spatial contextual awareness, especially in a war zone
- Making good and quick decisions based on factors such as fire and wind conditions
- Evasive maneuvering
- Understanding basic and advanced branches of aerodynamics

=== Safety ===
Safety issues in driving include:

- Flying in poor conditions and low visibility
- Experiencing high g−forces
- Risk of being in a dogfight
- Distracted flying

Distractions can compromise a airman's mental skills, as can any altered state of consciousness. Mental factors might play in, PTSD and CPTSD is often seen after increased levels of trauma after being exposed to war. Seizure disorders are among the leading medical causes of mental impairment within civilian aviation the armed forces and military aviation in the United States and Europe. The possibility of the aircraft malfunctioning is always a risk.

== By country ==
=== New Zealand ===
==== Royal New Zealand Air Force ====
"Airman" was a former general term used to describe service members of the Royal New Zealand Air Force. Following the Royal Air Force, the RNZAF now refers to its personnel as “aviators.”

=== United Kingdom ===
==== Royal Air Force ====
"Airman" and "airwoman" were formerly general terms used to describe members of the Royal Air Force, particularly other ranks. In 2021 those terms were changed to the gender-neutral term "aviator".

=== United States ===
==== United States Air Force ====
Airman
- Airman (USAF)

- Airman Insignia 1976–1991
- Country: United States
- Service branch: United States Air Force
- Abbreviation: Amn
- Rank group: Enlisted
- NATO rank code: OR-2
- Pay grade: E-2
- Next higher rank: Airman first class (USAF)
- Next lower rank: Airman basic (USAF)
- Equivalent ranks: Seaman apprentice (Navy & USCG); Private (USA); Private first class (USMC); Specialist 2 (USSF)

In the U.S. Air Force, "airman" is a general term which can refer to any member of the United States Air Force, regardless of rank, but is also a specific enlisted rank in the Air Force. The rank of airman (abbreviated "Amn") is the second enlisted rank from the bottom, just above the rank of Airman Basic, and just below that of Airman First Class. Since the Air Force was established in 1947, all of the various ranks of "airman" have always included women, and in this context, the word "man" means "human being". Former U.S. Air Force ranks included Airman Second Class and Airman Third Class. (Note: In 1967, there was significant reorganization of the enlisted ranks, and the former rank of "Airman First Class" became an "Air Force Sergeant"; the former "Airman" became the new "Airman First Class"; the former "Airman Second Class" became an "Airman"; and the former "Airman Third Class" became an "Airman Basic". All of the pay and fringe benefit grades remained as they were, just associated with new and less cumbersome rank names.) The current E-2 pay grade rank of Airman was called Airman Third Class from 1952 to 1967.

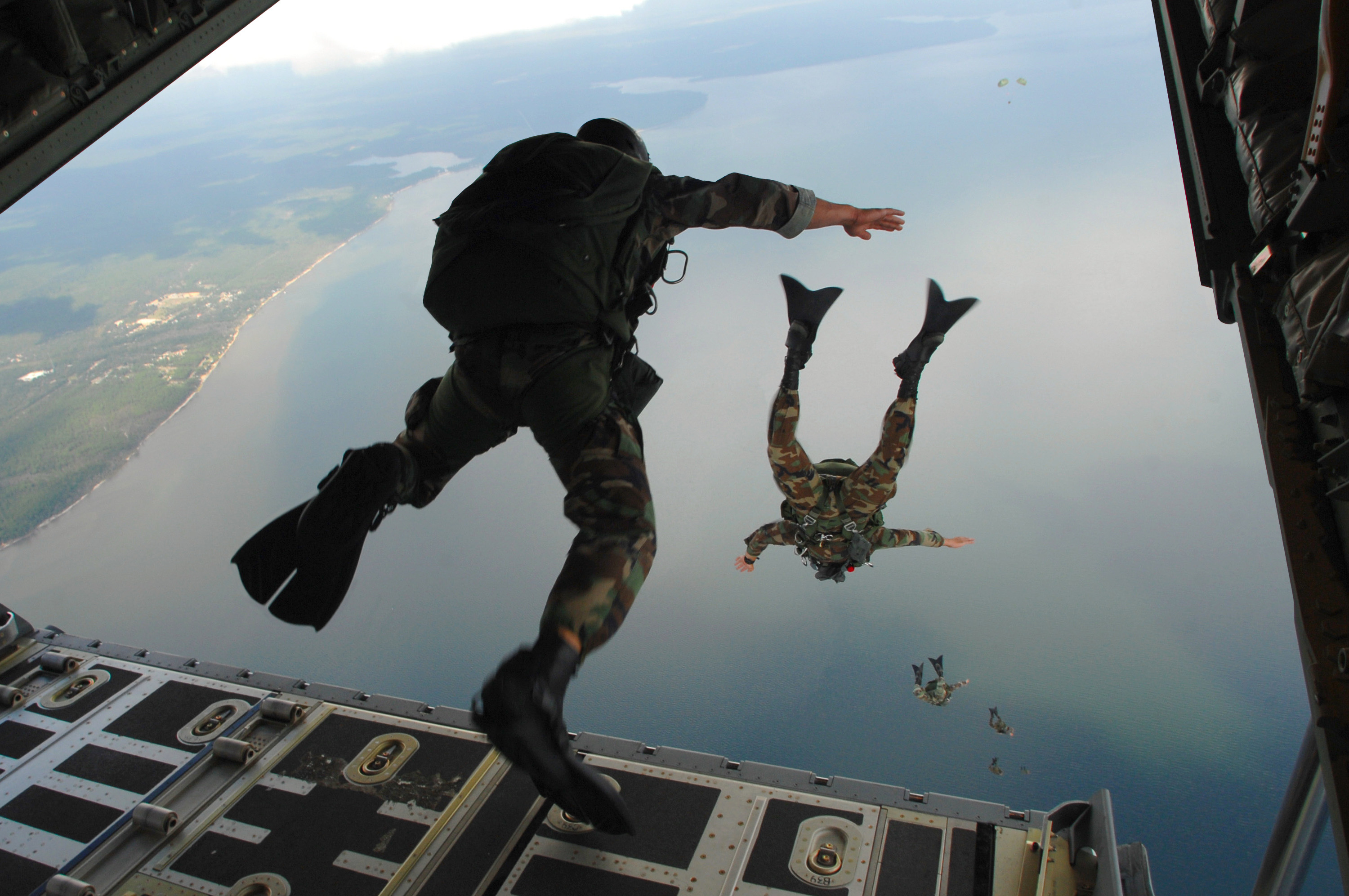
U.S. Air Force Airmen from the 720th STG parachute jumping out of a C-130J Hercules aircraft during water rescue training in the Florida panhandle

A person with the rank of Airman Basic is typically promoted to the rank of Airman after six months of active duty service in the Air Force, if that member had signed up for an enlistment period of at least four years of active duty. On the other hand, an enlistee could be promoted to the rank of Airman immediately after completing Air Force basic training (and thus paid somewhat more) given one of several additional qualifications:

- Having completed at least two years of a Junior Reserve Officers' Training Corps (Junior ROTC) while in high school.
- Having achieved the Eagle Scout rank from the Boy Scouts of America, or the Gold Award from the Girl Scouts of the United States of America.
- Having earned 20 college semester credit hours (30 quarter hours).

Those enlistees who have qualified for these early promotions to the rank of Airman are allowed to wear their single airman insignia stripe during the Air Force basic training graduation ceremony at Lackland Air Force Base at Joint Base San Antonio in Texas.

Where they also receive a retroactive pay increment that brings them up to the pay grade for an Airman upon their completion of basic training. (Thus, it is as if they have enlisted as Airmen on the first day, as far as their pay is concerned. However, if they do not complete basic training and are discharged, they do not receive the extra pay.)

While at the rank of Airman, the duties of enlisted personnel include adjusting to the Air Force way of military life and becoming proficient in their Air Force duty specialties. Note that upon leaving basic training, all Airmen enter a period of many weeks or many months of training at Air Force schools in their duty specialties that they and the Air Force have selected for them depending on their aptitudes and interests, and the needs of the Air Force. For Airmen with high aptitudes, some of these training programs include more than one school and take a year or more to complete.

Airmen are often nicknamed "mosquito wings" due to the insignia's resemblance to a mosquito's small wings.

==== Army Air Corps ====
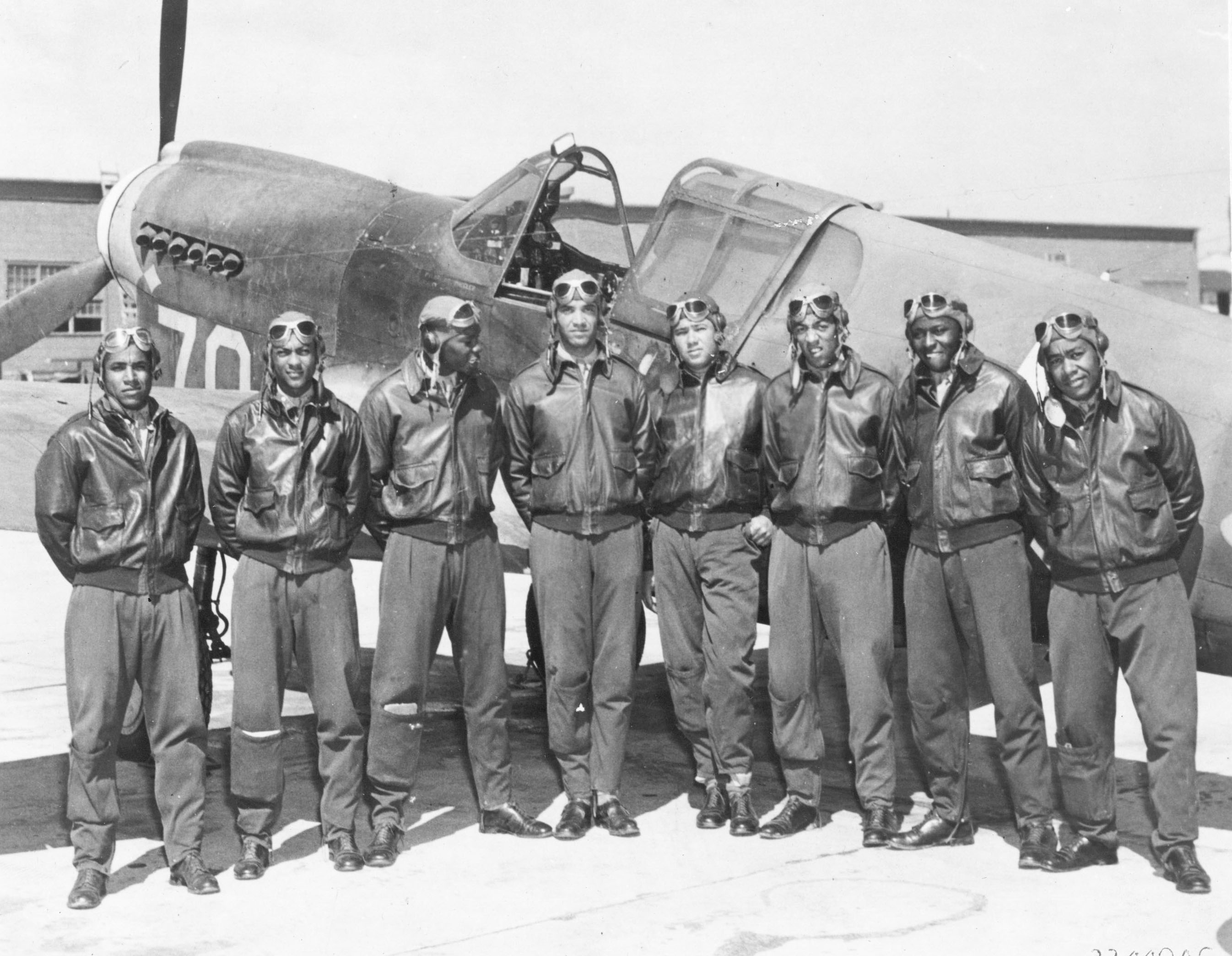
Eight Tuskegee Airmen in front of a P-40 fighter aircraft in 1942 or 1943

From 1926 to 1941, the Army Air Corps served as the armed service for aviation, the now diminished service, referenced the term airman for its primary operating roles. In the former Army Air Corps the term of aviator applies to navigators, air crew, mechanics, flight instructors, nurses, chefs, and support personnel. Historically it is mentioned when referring to the Tuskegee Airman, which was a squadron of African American pilots in World War II. By the end of World War II the Army Air Corps would be diminished, and in 1947 the Air Force was founded and adopted the term of Airmen, and used it for members of its service.

==== Navy ====
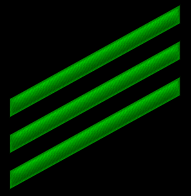
US Navy Airman E-3 rank insignia

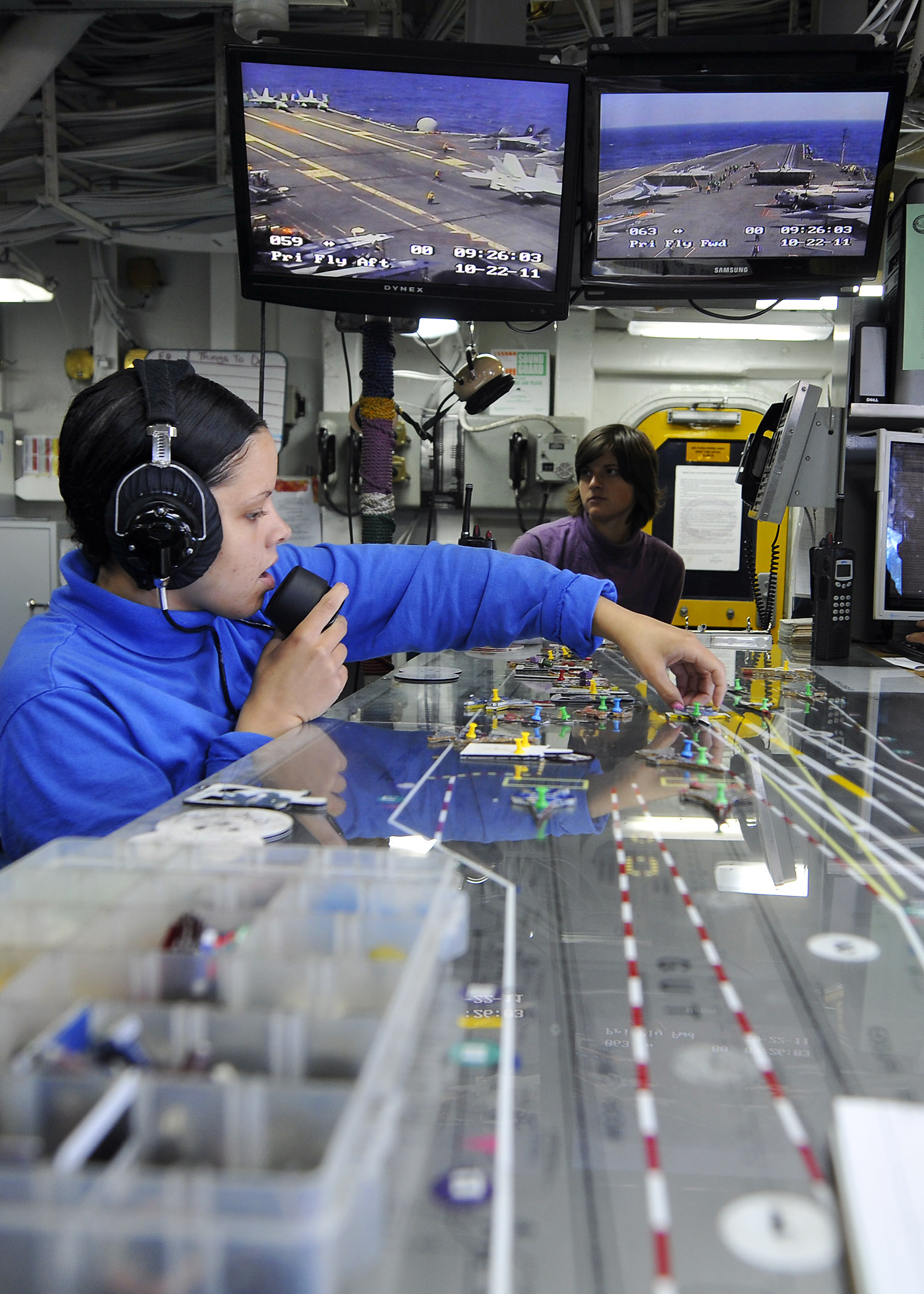
Navy airman participating in a training exercise in 2011

In the U.S. Navy, Airman is the enlisted rank that corresponds to the pay grade of E-3 in the Navy's aviation field, but it is just below the rank of Petty Officer Third Class, pay grade E-4. (Note: The following Navy rates (actual job names and functions) fall within the category of "Airman" and are all at the E-3 pay grade: AB: aviation boatswain's mate; ABH: aviation handler; ABE: aviation equipment; ABF: aviation fuel; AC: air traffic controlman; AD: aviation machinist's mate; AE: aviation electrician's mate; AG: aviation aerographer's mate; AM: aviation structural mechanic; AME: aviation structural mechanic (egress); AO: aviation ordnanceman; AS: aviation support equipment technician; AT: aviation electronics technician; AW: aviation warfare systems operator; AZ: aviation maintenance administrationman) The name of Airman though different in duties it is loosely related to that of Seamen. This term is also referred to a fireman, in engineering, and hospitalman in medical duties, respectively. The Airman rank is identified by its distinct green stripes. Particularly, opposite that of Seamen, its duties since 1922 when the very first aircraft carrier was established in the first world war have been air bases, maintaining navy aircraft, and that of aircraft carriers through tying down and refueling planes both domestically and abroad. (Note: "Class" E.g. B (Bomber), F (Fighter), notable ones include B-2, Stealth Bomber, F-15, Fighting Falcon.)

Regarding the U.S. Naval Sea Cadet Corps, (Note: A United States youth program sponsored and managed by the U.S Navy and U.S. Coast Guard, often referred to as USNSCC or NSCC.) a U.S Navy youth development program the term: "Airman" explicitly refers to a participant who participates in flight school with U.S. Navy and Coast Guard personnel and reservist. (Note: Also referred to as airman) The term is often tied to the own division's website, alternatively referred to as a squadron. (Note: The official terminology is unit, though the units referred to will operate completely differently than the United States Naval Sea Cadet Corps though still under their legal ownership.) The common and correct terminology for the flight school participants is the terminology of "Sea Cadet" or "Seamen" which is referred to by multiple magazines, media outlets, personal journals, and newspapers. The term in particular in the public-eye is almost never used and is most often never referred to in un-involved Sea Cadet organizations in the United States (i.e.. Colorado Sea Cadet Corps as of 2025). Most credibly, it is within papers such as legal documents, where it is mentioned by the official 9 latin characters, as "Sea Cadets" and the longform with 13 characters as "Sea Cadet Corps". While uncommon in popular culture as a terminology it does in turn offer benefits for its participants, including a possible private pilot license (PPL) though this amount of training is commonly portrayed as unachievable for most Sea Cadets unless well educated or gifted. The FAA's requirements have often made it stringent for most international Sea Cadets in their exchange program, as per a 2022 statement by the FAA requiring them to be well knowledgeable in reading, writing, and understanding English. This claim has been discredited by other Sea Cadets, instead stating it only takes time, dedication and hard work.

==== Coast Guard ====
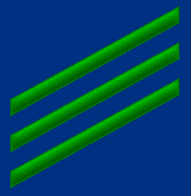
US Coast Guard E-3 Airman rank insignia

The U.S. Coast Guard rank of airman is identical to the pay grade and naval rank of the U.S Navy. Coast Guard Airman corresponds to the pay grade of E-3 in the Coast Guard's aviation field respectively. Airman is classified as the rank above the Coast Guard rank of airman apprentice, Seaman Apprentice, Fireman Apprentice which is the E-2 pay grade, but it is directly below the rank of Petty Officer Third Class, E-4 pay grade. A airman may be tasked with maintaining and stowing aircraft to gain experience.

== See also ==
- Military pilot
- Soldier
- Sailor
- Marine
- RAF enlisted ranks
- Aircraftman
