= Weighted Airman Promotion System =

United States Air Force program

The Weighted Airman Promotion System (WAPS) is a United States Air Force program that determines promotions to the ranks of Staff Sergeant (E-5) through Technical Sergeant (E-6). It provides feedback score sheets to enlisted members considered for promotion, which help members to focus on specific professional development needs. Selections for promotion to Master Sergeant (E-7), Senior Master Sergeant (E-8), and Chief Master Sergeant (E-9) utilize an integrated weighted and central selection board system. In addition to the weighted score, the central selection board evaluates each individual using the whole person concept. Board scores are determined by considering performance, leadership, breadth of experience, job responsibility, professional competence, specific achievements, and education. The board score is added to the weighted score to determine order of merit for promotion.

== Online score calculator ==
The WAPS Promotion Score Calculator is used by enlisted airmen to estimate the minimum test score for promotion to the next enlisted rank. Users enter the promotion year, enlisted grade, their "Total Active Federal Military Service Date", date of their last promotion, EPRs, military decorations, and an estimate of the "Air Force Promotion Cutoff Score" in the Web page's form. The calculator displays the estimated score if the airman is eligible for promotion during the promotion cycle.

== Number of promotions ==
Each year, The Air Force determines the number of promotions needed to fulfill mission requirements and manning goals as set forth by law and regulation. The Air Force then divides these slots by percentages across its various Air Force Specialty Codes (AFSCs), with a few career fields receiving a few extra slots. The result is a system in which each candidate for promotion only competes against those in the same Air Force Specialty (AFS). The numbers of promotion slots are not disclosed until after testing.

== Points ==
Eligible candidates receive points based on a number of criteria, including awards and decorations, Enlisted Performance Report (EPR) points, Promotion Fitness Examination (PFE) points, and Specialty Knowledge Test (SKT) points. Fractions of points are awarded for certain categories, resulting in scores that are not whole numbers. Candidates with the highest numbers of points, up to the promotion allowance in each career field, are promoted.

The score of the last person promoted is known as the cutoff. The cutoff can gauge how narrowly a given candidate missed a promotion. The cutoff score varies because of variations in both the number of promotion slots and the number of points earned by the top candidates.

=== Awards and decorations ===
For awards and decorations, a maximum of 25 points is allowed. Point values follow order of precedence.

- 1 pt – Achievement Medal (all versions)
- 3 pts – Commendation Medal (all versions)
- 3 pts – Aerial Achievement Medal
- 3 pts – Air Medal
- 5 pts – Meritorious Service Medal
- 5 pts – Defense Meritorious Service Medal
- 5 pts – Purple Heart
- 5 pts – Bronze Star
- 5 pts – Airman's Medal
- 7 pts – Distinguished Flying Cross
- 7 pts – Defense Superior Service Medal
- 7 pts – Legion of Merit
- 9 pts – Silver Star
- 9 pts – Distinguished Service Medal
- 9 pts – Defense Distinguished Service Medal
- 11 pts – Air Force Cross, Navy Cross, or Distinguished Service Cross
- 15 pts – Medal of Honor (Note: Promotion to next highest grade usually will occur the first day of the month following awarding of MOH)

=== Promotion Fitness Examination (PFE) ===
The Promotion Fitness Examination is a test of material taken from the Professional Development Guide. It covers a wide range of US Air Force knowledge, including history, organization, regulations, practices, traditions, and customs. The number of PFE points awarded is equal to the number of correct responses out of the 80 items on the exam.

=== Specialty knowledge test (SKT) ===
The Specialty Knowledge Test is a multiple choice test consisting of 100 questions. Test material is taken from the Career Development Course (CDCs) and applicable Air Force instructions and manuals for each AFSC, as the SKT is specific to a candidate's AFSC. The number of points earned on the SKT is the number of points awarded toward promotion.

Some members do not take the SKT. A common reason for this is that a candidate is performing a special duty and does not have CDCs. In other cases, candidates are in the process of retraining and have not completed the CDCs for the new role. Other candidates may not have access to their CDCs for one reason or another. When a candidate does not take the SKT, the PFE score counts again in place of the SKT. This is termed either "PFE only" or "SKT exempt".

Taking the tests is known as "WAPS testing" or "promotion testing".

== Line numbers ==
When promotions have been determined, a list is drawn up and each person is assigned a promotion sequence number, commonly known as a line number. The line number dictates the order in which candidates will be promoted, as if all of the promotees were waiting in a line. Line numbers are issued according to time in current grade, not by promotion scores, as is frequently perceived. Line numbers are assigned across the entire Air Force rather than by AFSC. Promotions begin in September and continue each month (on the first of the month) for 12 months for SSgts. TSgt and MSgt promotions start in August.

== Criticisms ==
The promotion system has come under heavy criticism from all ranks in the Air Force. The primary complaint is that the EPR system has become "inflated," with most average and above average individuals (including the stellar performers) receiving scores of five. Academic testing thus becomes a major deciding factor, which may not be a true indication of readiness for leadership and responsibility.

Prior to the WAPS system, the entire promotion fitness was determined by the APR (Airman Performance Report) - the predecessor of the current EPR. These were also inflated to the point that anything less than a 9 (top rating at the time) would not get one promoted.

== Notes ==
- AFI 36-2502, Airman Promotion Program (PDF)
- AFPAM 36-2241, Professional Development Guide (PDG) (PDF), also as MP3s
- WAPS Catalog (PDF)
