= United States Space Force rank insignia =

United States Space Force rank insignia are used to indicate the rank and status of the United States Space Force officers and enlisted personnel. Equivalency between the military services is indicated by associated NATO code and pay grade.

== Insignia ==
=== Officer insignia ===
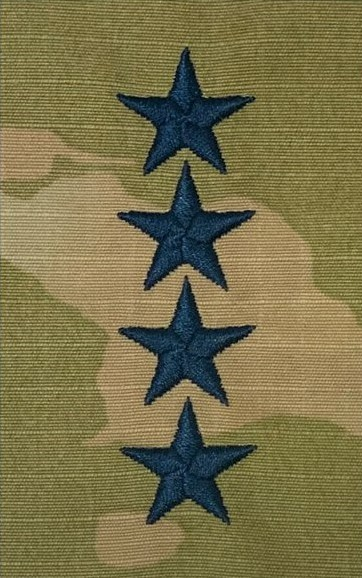
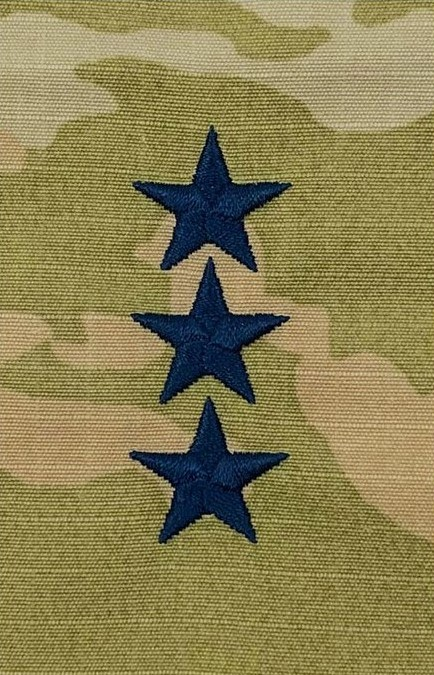
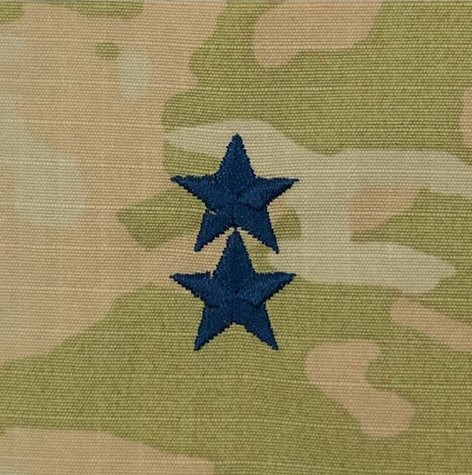
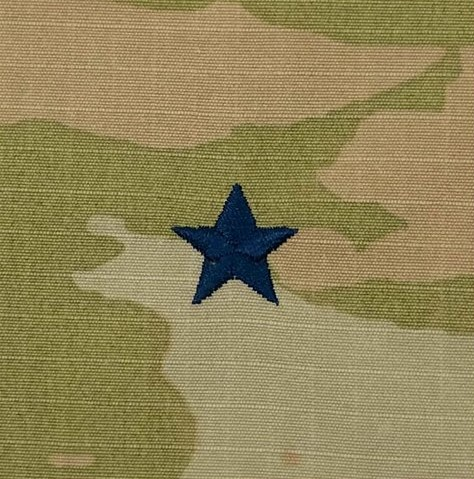
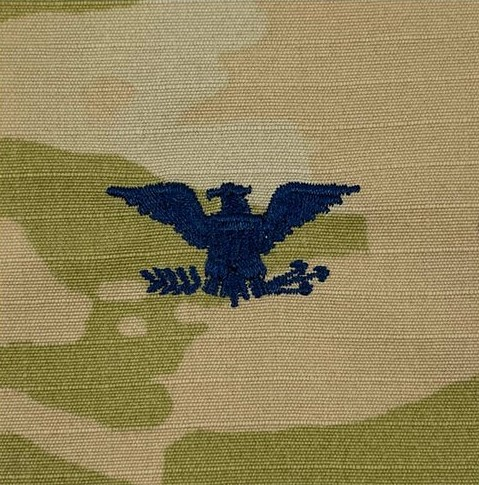
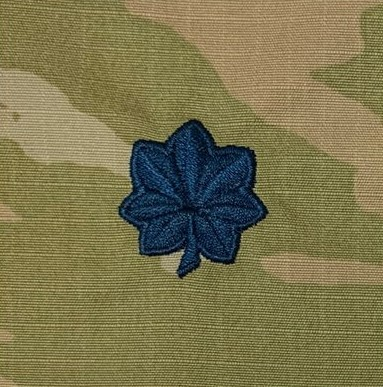
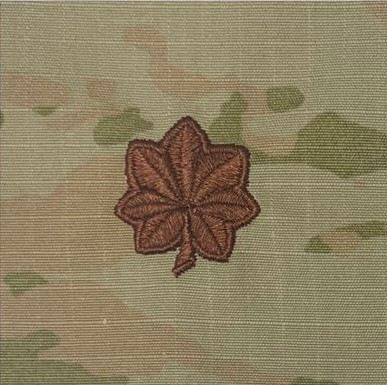
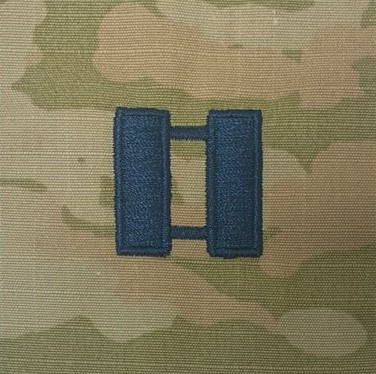
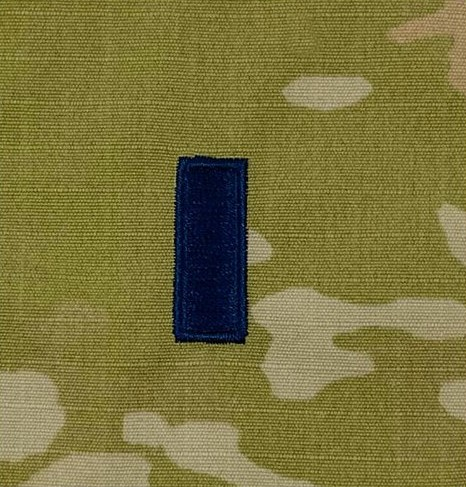
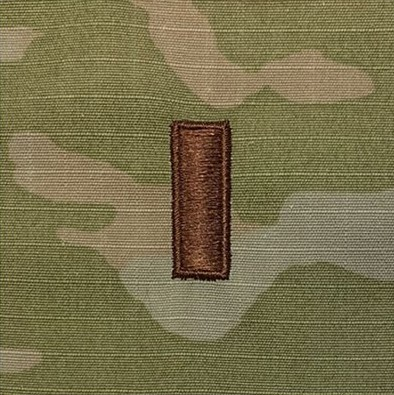
US DoD pay grade	O-10	O-9	O-8	O-7	O-6	O-5	O-4	O-3	O-2	O-1	Officer candidate
NATO code	OF-9	OF-8	OF-7	OF-6	OF-5	OF-4	OF-3	OF-2	OF-1		OF(D)
Insignia											Various insignia
Service dress uniform (Class A)
Service uniform (Class B)
Mess dress uniform
OCP uniform
Title	General	Lieutenant general	Major general	Brigadier general	Colonel	Lieutenant colonel	Major	Captain	First lieutenant	Second lieutenant	Cadet / Officer trainee
Abbreviation	Gen	Lt Gen	Maj Gen	Brig Gen	Col	Lt Col	Maj	Capt	1st Lt	2d Lt	Cdt / OT

=== Enlisted insignia ===
US DoD pay grade	E-9 Special (Note: SEAC and CMSSF have E-9 pay grades but are given unique pay.)		E-9	E-8	E-7	E-6	E-5	E-4	E-3	E-2	E-1
NATO code	OR-9			OR-8	OR-7	OR-6	OR-5	OR-4	OR-3	OR-2	OR-1
Insignia
Title	Senior Enlisted Advisor to the Chairman	Chief Master Sergeant of the Space Force	Chief master sergeant	Senior master sergeant	Master sergeant	Technical sergeant	Sergeant	Specialist 4	Specialist 3	Specialist 2	Specialist 1
Abbreviation	SEAC	CMSSF	CMSgt	SMSgt	MSgt	TSgt	Sgt	Spc4	Spc3	Spc2	Spc1

== Rank insignia wear ==
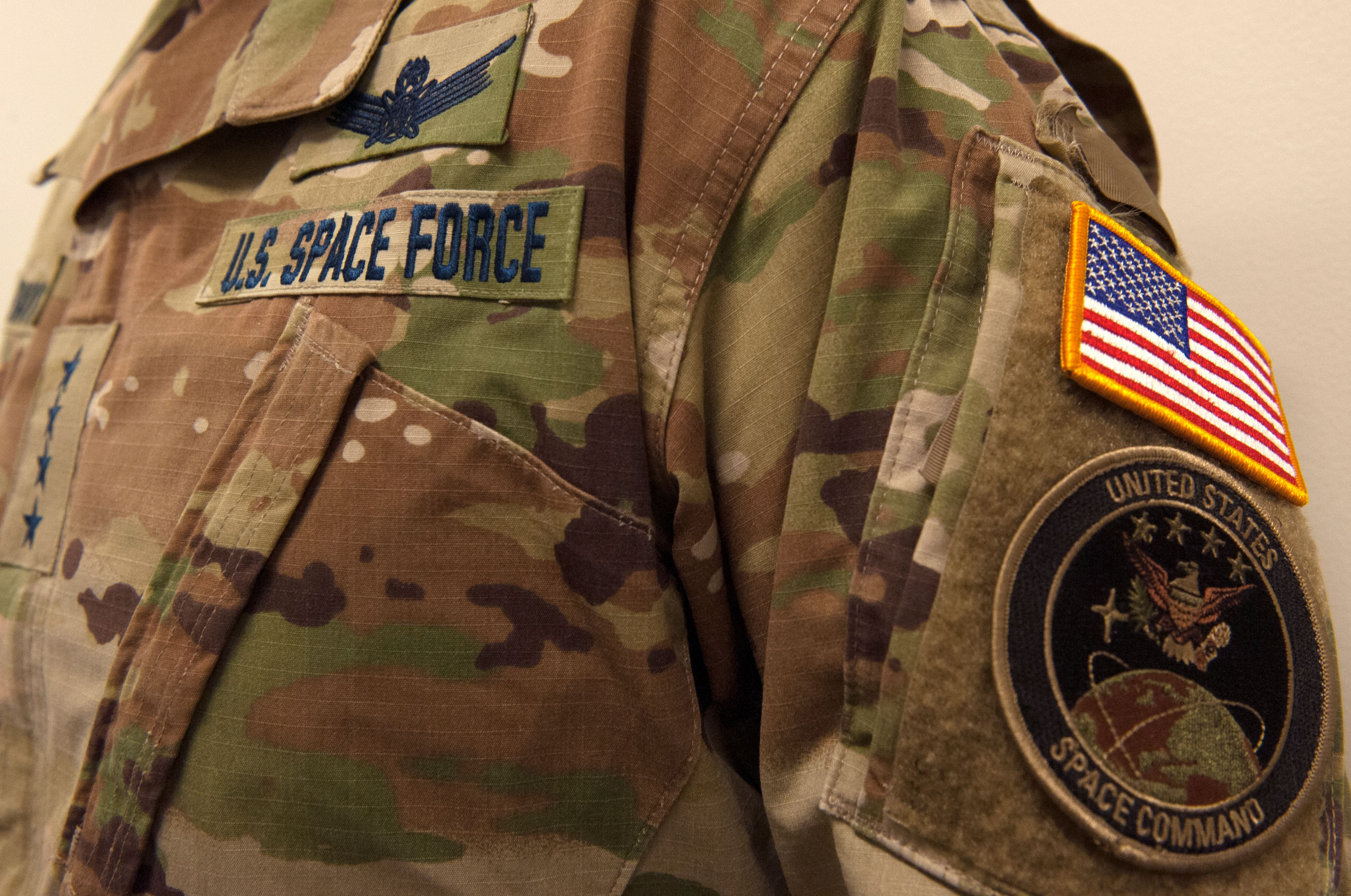
A Space Force general's OCP uniform.

On the service dress uniform, metal rank insignia is worn on the shoulder straps. On the OCP uniform, the Space Force's combat utility uniform, embroidered navy blue rank insignia is worn on an OCP patch on the center of the chest.

== History ==
The creation of the Space Force marked the first time since the 1947 creation of the Air Force that a new branch was created. This created an interest in the rank structure and insignia. In February 2020, it was announced that the Space Force would ask military space professionals for opinions on ranks.

Eighty-six graduates of the United States Air Force Academy class of 2020 commissioned directly into the USSF, becoming the service's first new officers and second lieutenants. On July 28, 2020, four general officers from the Air Force were nominated to transfer to the Space Force in their current grade of major general, and then be promoted to lieutenant general. On August 6, 2020, a number of Air Force officers were transferred to the Space Force in the ranks of major, lieutenant colonel and colonel. On September 1, 2020, the Air Force transferred 2410 active-duty airmen to the Space Force to become enlisted space professionals. The space professionals were all transferred to the Space Force in their current enlisted ranks.

The Space Force was set to announce its new rank structure in late August 2020 but decided to delay it temporarily, as a proposed amendment included in the United States House of Representatives's version of the 2021 National Defense Authorization Act would require the Space Force to adopt a rank structure based on that of the United States Navy for its officers and enlisted space professionals. The Space Force decided to wait until after the 2021 NDAA was passed, before moving forward with their permanent rank structure. While awaiting the passage of the NDAA, all members of the Space Force retained their respective grade and rank carried over from the Air Force. On November 16, 2020, the United States Senate passed the House of Representatives' version of the NDAA, but attached an amendment which would remove the clause requiring the Space Force to adopt naval ranks, and sent it back to the House for consideration. The House unanimously disagreed with the Senate's amendment and sent the amended bill back to their armed services committee on November 18, for consideration of passage. The final version of the NDAA removed any requirement for the Space Force to adopt naval ranks. The official rank structure became effective on February 1, 2021, which includes the rank of specialist being used for paygrades E-1 to E-4 for the first time since the Army discontinued its use of multiple specialist ranks in 1985. The rank of 'Sergeant' replaces 'Staff Sergeant' as used by the Air Force in the pay grade of E-5.

On 20 September 2021, Chief Master Sergeant of the Space Force, Roger A. Towberman, announced the selected insignia.

In May 2022, changes to the interim officer uniform were introduced. Buttons were changed from the Hap Arnold star and wings to the Space Force Delta.

In December 2023, Congress passed the 2024 National Defense Authorization Act which permanently established the titles of commissioned officer ranks of the Space Force to be the same as the Army, Marine Corps, and Air Force.

=== Enlisted rank insignia development ===
On 2 March 2021, the Space Force released a survey for guardians to give feedback on four sets of enlisted rank insignia. One version of the proposed enlisted rank insignia mirrored the current Air Force design, but with the Air Corps star replaced by the Delta, Globe, and Orbit. Another version resembled Army and Marine Corps enlisted insignia, but with the Delta, Globe, and Orbit at the bottom of the design. A third inverted the Army/Marine Corps' styled chevrons. A fourth option resembled Navy and Coast Guard rank insignia.

US DoD pay grade	E-9	E-8	E-7	E-6	E-5	E-4	E-3	E-2	E-1
NATO code	OR-9	OR-8	OR-7	OR-6	OR-5	OR-4	OR-3	OR-2	OR-1
Version 1									No insignia
Version 2									No insignia
Version 3									No insignia
Version 4									No insignia
Title	Chief master sergeant	Senior master sergeant	Master sergeant	Technical sergeant	Sergeant	Specialist 4	Specialist 3	Specialist 2	Specialist 1
Abbreviation	CMSgt	SMSgt	MSgt	TSgt	Sgt	Spc4	Spc3	Spc2	Spc1

=== Timeline of changes ===
US DoD pay grade	E-9			E-8	E-7	E-6	E-5	E-4	E-3	E-2	E-1
NATO code	OR-9			OR-8	OR-7	OR-6	OR-5	OR-4	OR-3	OR-2	OR-1
April 2020											No insignia
April 2020	Senior Enlisted Advisor to the Chairman	Senior Enlisted Advisor of the Space Force	Chief master sergeant	Senior master sergeant	Master sergeant	Technical sergeant	Staff sergeant	Senior airman	Airman first class	Airman	Airman basic
January 2021											No insignia
January 2021	Senior Enlisted Advisor to the Chairman	Chief Master Sergeant of the Space Force	Chief master sergeant	Senior master sergeant	Master sergeant	Technical sergeant	Sergeant	Specialist 4	Specialist 3	Specialist 2	Specialist 1
September 2021
September 2021	Senior Enlisted Advisor to the Chairman	Chief Master Sergeant of the Space Force	Chief master sergeant	Senior master sergeant	Master sergeant	Technical sergeant	Sergeant	Specialist 4	Specialist 3	Specialist 2	Specialist 1

== See also ==
- Uniforms of the United States Space Force
- Ranks and insignia of space forces
