= Enlisted Performance Report =

An Enlisted Performance Report (EPR) is an evaluation form used by the United States Air Force. Instructions for constructing an EPR appear in chapter 3 of Air Force Instruction 36-2406: Officer and Enlisted Evaluation Systems. The EPR replaced the Airman Performance Report (APR) in the late 1980s. The EPR was replaced by the Enlisted Performance Brief (EPB) in 2023.

The USAF commissioned officer equivalent is the Officer Performance Report (OPR). The United States Navy equivalent is the Fitness Report (FITREP). The United States Army equivalent is the Enlisted Evaluation Report (EER).

== Purpose ==
- To provide meaningful feedback to individuals on what is expected of them, advice on how well they are meeting those expectations, and advice on how to better meet those expectations.
- To provide a reliable, long-term, cumulative record of performance and potential based on that performance.
- To provide officer central selection boards, senior NCO evaluation boards, the Weighted Airman Promotion System (WAPS), and other personnel managers sound information to assist in identifying the best qualified enlisted personnel. In WAPS, past EPRs are worth up to 135 points.

== Evaluation ==
An EPR evaluates the performance of an enlisted member both on and off duty. The period of time covered by the EPR is normally no less than 120 days and no longer than 365 days. EPRs are normally written by the member's supervisor with additional input provided by their supervisor's supervisor.

Although the bulk of the evaluation is focused on their duty (job) performance, enlisted members are also evaluated on their off-duty performance in areas such as volunteerism and continuing education. This is arguably the biggest difference between the Air Force EPR and civilian counterparts.

Personnel who have left the Air Force and are seeking jobs in the civilian world will sometimes use EPRs to augment their résumé.

== Annual Static Closeout Dates (SCOD) ==
In 2014/2015 reports were changed to close out on the same date every year and change of reporting official reports were eliminated.

- SrA and below with 20 months or more TAFMS: 31 March (started in 2015)
- SSgt: 31 January (started in 2015)
- TSgt: 30 November (started in 2014)
- MSgt: 30 September (started in 2015)
- SMSgt: 31 July
- CMSgt: 31 May

== Stratification statements ==
Stratification is the "rack-and-stack" process senior raters use to identify their top promotion-eligible master sergeants and senior master sergeants. Senior raters are limited to stratifying the top 10 percent of their master sergeant promotion-eligible Airmen and the top 20 percent of their senior master sergeant promotion-eligible Airmen. Promotion-eligible senior NCOs who are not stratified will have their evaluations close out at the deputy evaluator (first O-6) or intermediate evaluator (unit commander) level. Only those who are stratified will have their evaluation signed/closed out by the senior evaluator (senior rater).

Stratification statements must be stated in quantitative terms (#1 of 125 MSgts) and will be based on the number of peers (in the same grade as the ratee) assigned within the evaluator's rating scheme. Stratification statements on all other performance reports, to include CMSgt reports, are strictly prohibited.

== History ==
On 12 July 2007 the Air Force announced a major overhaul of the content of the EPR and OPR reports in an effort to decrease the time required to accomplish the report. EPR narrative comments were significantly reduced and performance assessment areas now reflect the increased responsibility Airmen are charged with as they progress in rank. A section on physical fitness was added, with those scoring less than 75 receiving a referral report. Another new feature of the EPR is the ratee's signature as well as the use of digital signatures using the Common Access Card (CAC).

The implementation dates of the new versions were as follows:

- Senior Master Sergeant: Aug. 1, 2007
- Chief Master Sergeant: Aug. 15, 2007
- Airman Basic to Senior Airman: Aug. 15, 2007
- Master Sergeant: Oct. 1, 2007
- Staff Sergeant: Jan. 1, 2008
- Technical Sergeant: Jan. 1, 2008
- Premier Band (3N2X1): April 1, 2008

The format for entries in the Enlisted Performance Report continues to be the "bullet statement format".

On 1 January 2014 a revised AFI and slightly revised EPR forms were released adding organizational climate to the listed of items to consider in the Primary/Additional Duties section.

Starting November 2014, static -or fixed - annual close out dates will be used for each rank tied to regular Air Force (RegAF) promotion eligibility cut-off dates (PECD). The static dates will enable the implementation of the forced distribution and restricted stratification policy and result in more accurate, useful performance-based evaluations. The new reports will include a section for promotion recommendations that will curb inflation through forced distribution and stratification restrictions.

== Criticism ==
The EPR system has come under heavy criticism from all ranks in the Air Force. The primary complaint is that the system has become inflated. While technically the 1 through 5 scale is supposed to award an "average" performer a 3 and the 5 should be reserved for members that are "Truly Among the Best", the practice has been that nearly all personnel receive a 5 unless there are major disciplinary problems. The 2010 SSgt promotion cycle statistics show that the average eligible SrA received 128.79 points from a possible 135 from their EPR ratings, meaning the average eligible tester received one "4" and two "5" ratings. A cause may be that there is no additional guidance on the definition of a truly stellar member, and the deciding factor is most often other portions of WAPS testing, where performance is meant to be rated.

In 2014/2015 quotas (Forced Distribution) were implemented limiting the percentage of promotion-eligible airmen able to get the top two promotion recommendations.

== Examples ==
- Enlisted Performance Report Information and Examples
