= Uniformed services of the United States =

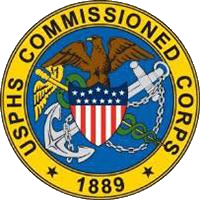
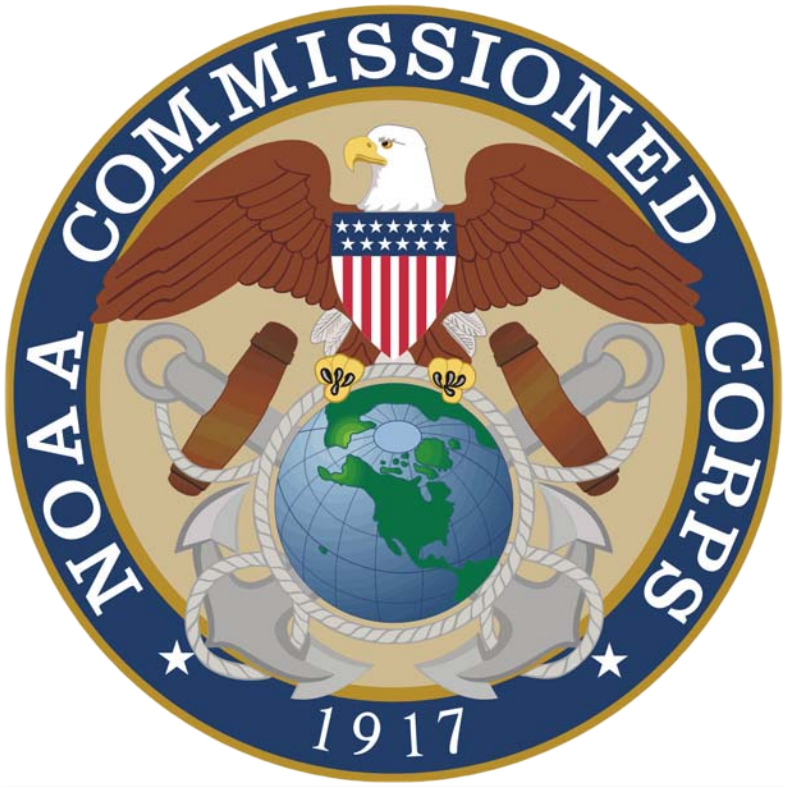
- The emblems of the eight U.S. uniformed services
- Founded: 14 June 1775; 251 years ago (Note: With the establishment of the Continental Army.)
- Service branches: U.S. Army; U.S. Marine Corps; U.S. Navy; U.S. Air Force; U.S. Space Force; U.S. Coast Guard; U.S. PHS Commissioned Corps; NOAA Commissioned Officer Corps

Leadership
- President: Donald Trump
- Secretaries: Pete Hegseth (DoD); Markwayne Mullin (DHS); Robert F. Kennedy Jr. (HHS); Howard Lutnick (DOC)

Personnel
- Military age: 17 with parental consent, 18 for voluntary service. (Note: Maximum age for first-time enlistment is 35 for the Army, 28 for the Marine Corps, 34 for the Navy, 39 for the Air Force and 27 for the Coast Guard.)
- Conscription: Male only (inactive since 1973)
- Active personnel: 1,374,125 (ranked 3rd)
- Reserve personnel: 849,450
- Deployed personnel: 170,000

Expenditure
- Budget: US$721.5 billion (2020) (ranked 1st)
- Percent of GDP: 3.42% (2019)

Industry
- Domestic suppliers: List

Related articles
- History: Military history of the United States List of engagements American Revolutionary War; Whiskey Rebellion; Indian Wars; Barbary Wars; War of 1812; Patriot War; Mexican–American War; Utah War; Cortina Troubles; Reform War; American Civil War: New York City draft riots; Las Cuevas War; Spanish–American War; Banana Wars; Philippine–American War; Boxer Rebellion; Border War; World War I Russian Civil War; World War II; Cold War: Puerto Rican Nationalist Party insurgency; Korean War; 1958 Lebanon crisis; Dominican Civil War; Bay of Pigs Invasion; Cuban Missile Crisis; Vietnam War; Korean DMZ Conflict; Operation Eagle Claw; Multinational Force Lebanon; Operation Urgent Fury; Operation Golden Pheasant; Operation Just Cause; Persian Gulf War; Somali Civil War: Operation Gothic Serpent; Battle of Mogadishu; Bosnian War: Operation Deliberate Force; Operation Deny Flight; Kosovo War: Operation Allied Force; Global War on Terrorism: Operation Enduring Freedom; Afghanistan; Philippines; Horn of Africa; Trans Sahara; Iraq War; Intervention against ISIL; Insurgency in Khyber Pakhtunkhwa; Military deployment after Hurricane Katrina; Pakistan–United States skirmishes Other
- Ranks: Commissioned officer: Army officer; Marine Corps officer; Navy officer; Air Force officer; Space Force officer; Coast Guard officer; Public Health Service officer; NOAA Corps officer; Warrant officer: Army warrant officer; Marine Corps warrant officer; Navy warrant officer; Air Force warrant officer; Coast Guard warrant officer; Enlisted: Army enlisted; Marine Corps enlisted; Navy enlisted; Air Force enlisted; Space Force enlisted; Coast Guard enlisted

The United States has eight federal uniformed services that commission officers as defined by Title 10 and subsequently structured and organized by Titles 10, 14, 32, 33, and 42 of the U.S. Code.

== Uniformed services ==
The uniformed services are:

1. Army
2. Marine Corps
3. Navy
4. Air Force
5. Space Force
6. Coast Guard
7. Public Health Service Commissioned Corps
8. National Oceanic and Atmospheric Administration Commissioned Officer Corps

Each of the uniformed services is administratively headed by a federal executive department and its corresponding civilian Cabinet leader.

== Federal executive departments ==
Department of the Army (DA)

- Army (USA): Established 14 June 1775

Department of the Navy (DON)

- Marine Corps (USMC): Established 10 November 1775
- Navy (USN): Established 13 October 1775

Department of the Air Force (DAF)

- Air Force (USAF): Established 18 September 1947
- Space Force (USSF): Established 20 December 2019

The order of precedence within the Department of Defense is set by DoD Directive 1005.8 and is not dependent on the date of creation by the U.S. Congress.

- Coast Guard (USCG): Established 4 August 1790 as the Revenue-Marine

Prior to 1967, the Coast Guard was part of the Department of the Treasury. In 1967, it became a part of the Department of Transportation. In 2002, it was placed under the Department of Homeland Security. During times of war, it may be transferred to the Department of the Navy, under the Department of Defense.

- Public Health Service Commissioned Corps (PHSCC): Established 4 January 1889

The Corps is headed by the Surgeon General of the United States. The corps may be detailed to the armed forces by order of the president.

- National Oceanic and Atmospheric Administration Commissioned Officer Corps (NOAA Corps): Established 22 May 1917.

The NOAA Corps was created as the United States Coast and Geodetic Survey Corps, a component of the United States Coast and Geodetic Survey, on 22 May 1917. It was removed from the Coast and Geodetic Survey and became a component of the Environmental Science Services Administration (ESSA) as the Environmental Science Services Administration Corps (ESSA Corps) upon the establishment of ESSA on 13 July 1965. The ESSA Corps became the NOAA Corps as a component of NOAA when ESSA was abolished and NOAA simultaneously was created on 3 October 1970. Under all three names, the corps has been an element of the Department of Commerce throughout its existence. The corps may be detailed to the armed forces by order of the president.

== Statutory definition ==
The eight uniformed services are defined by 10 U.S.C. § 101(a)(5):

The term "uniformed services" means—
(A) the armed forces;
(B) the commissioned corps of the National Oceanic and Atmospheric Administration; and
(C) the commissioned corps of the Public Health Service.

The six uniformed services that make up the armed forces of the United States are defined in the previous clause, 10 U.S.C. § 101(a)(4):

The term "armed forces" means the Army, Navy, Air Force, Marine Corps, Space Force, and Coast Guard.

All eight uniformed services are subject to the provisions of 10 U.S.C. § 1408, the Uniformed Services Former Spouses' Protection Act.

== U.S. Armed Forces ==
Six of the uniformed services make up the armed forces as defined by Title 10, five of which are within the Department of Defense. The Coast Guard is part of the Department of Homeland Security and has both military and law enforcement duties. Title 14 states that the Coast Guard is part of the armed forces at all times, making it the only branch of the military outside the Department of Defense. During a declared state of war, however, the President of the United States or U.S. Congress may direct that the Coast Guard operate as part of the Department of the Navy. The Public Health Service Commissioned Corps, along with the NOAA Commissioned Officer Corps, operate under military rules with the exception of the applicability of the Uniform Code of Military Justice, to which they are subject only when militarized by executive order or while detailed to any component of the armed forces.

Reserve components of the United States Armed Forces are all members of the military who serve in a reserve capacity. The National Guard is an additional reserve military component of the Army and Air Force, respectively, and is composed of National Guard units, which operate under Title 32 and under state authority as the Army National Guard and Air National Guard. The militia that later became the National Guard was first formed in the Colony of Virginia in 1607 and is the oldest uniformed military force founded in the New World. The National Guard can also be mobilized by the president to operate under federal authority through Title 10. When acting under federal direction, the National Guard is managed by the National Guard Bureau, which is a joint Army and Air Force activity under the Department of Defense, with a 4-star general from the Army or Air Force appointed as its top leader. However, in federal service, command and control of National Guard organizations will fall under the designated geographic or functional combatant commander. The National Guard serves as a reserve component for both the Army and the Air Force, and can be called up for federal active duty in times of war or national emergencies.

== Non-armed uniformed services ==
- The Public Health Service Commissioned Corps (PHSCC) is the uniformed personnel system of the Public Health Service, which is under the Department of Health and Human Services.
- The National Oceanic and Atmospheric Administration Commissioned Officer Corps (NOAA Corps) is a uniformed branch of the National Oceanic and Atmospheric Administration (NOAA), which is under the Department of Commerce.

Commissioned officers of the PHSCC and NOAA Corps wear uniforms that are derived from U.S. Navy and Coast Guard uniforms, except that the commissioning devices, buttons, and insignia reflect their specific service. Uniformed officers of the PHSCC and NOAA Corps are paid on the same scale as members of the armed services, with respective rank and time-in-grade. Additionally, PHSCC officers are covered by the Uniformed Services Employment and Re-employment Rights Act and the Servicemembers Civil Relief Act (formerly the Soldiers and Sailors Civil Relief Act). The PHSCC and NOAA Corps consist of commissioned officers only and have no warrant officer ranks or enlisted ranks.

Commissioned officers of the PHSCC and NOAA Corps may be militarized by order of the president. Because they are commissioned officers, they can be classified as prisoners of war (POW) under the Geneva Conventions if captured by a belligerent entity. The PHSCC traces its origins to a system of marine hospitals created by An Act for the relief of sick and disabled seamen, passed by Congress in 1798; it adopted a military model of organization in 1871. The Coast and Geodetic Survey (USC&GS), a predecessor to NOAA, originally began commissioning its officers so that if captured while engaged in battlefield surveying, they would be protected under the law of armed conflict and could not be tried or executed as spies. The USC&GS Commissioned Officer Corps became the Environmental Science Services Administration Corps (ESSA Corps), upon the creation of the Environmental Science Services Administration on 13 July 1965, then became the NOAA Corps upon the creation of NOAA on 3 October 1970.

== U.S. Maritime Service ==
The United States Maritime Service is a federal uniformed organization within the Department of Transportation that is no longer structurally organized. As such, it is not officially listed as a federal uniformed service as defined by U.S. law. However, under the authority of the president and the United States secretary of transportation, the service still commissions officers to serve as administrators and instructors at the United States Merchant Marine Academy and state maritime academies. Commissioned officers of the Maritime Service cannot be deployed or assigned to another military service, and thus are not subject to the Uniform Code of Military Justice. While their capture by an enemy is unlikely, they would be classified as POWs under the Geneva Conventions if they were.

== See also ==
- Civil Air Patrol
- Military badges of the United States
- State defense force
- Strategic Sealift Officer Program
- United States Coast Guard Auxiliary
- United States Merchant Marine
