= U.S. Air Force rank insignia =

U.S. Air Force rank insignia can refer to:

- United States Air Force enlisted rank insignia
- United States Air Force officer rank insignia
