= EER =

EER may refer to:

- East of England Regiment, a British Army Reserve unit
- Effective exchange rate
- Energy efficiency rating in the Australian Capital Territory
- Energy efficiency ratio, of a cooling device
- Engineering education research
- Enhanced entity–relationship model
- Enlisted Evaluation Report, used by the United States Army
- Equal Error Rate, see Biometrics
- Equine exertional rhabdomyolysis
- Estonian Greens (Estonian: Erakond Eestimaa Rohelised), a political party in Estonia
- European Economic Review, a scholarly journal
- Experimental event rate
- West Virginia Mountaineers, the athletic teams that represent West Virginia University

== See also ==
- Energy Efficiency and Renewable Energy (EERE), a U.S. government office
