= Fitness Report =

A Fitness Report (FITREP) is an evaluation form used by the United States Navy and United States Marine Corps. Navy officers are given Fitness Reports, while Navy chief petty officers (E-7 to E-9) are given "Chief EVALs" and Navy sailors E-6 and below are issued Evaluation Reports (EVALs). Marine enlisted from the rank of sergeant (E-5) to sergeant major/ master gunnery sergeant (E-9) and officers are given Fitness Reports, while junior Marines are given Proficiency and Conduct marks ("Pros/Cons").

The United States Air Force equivalents are the Enlisted Performance Report (EPR) and Officer Performance Report. The United States Army equivalents are the Enlisted Evaluation Report (EER) and Officer Evaluation Report.
