= Norman Marous =

USAF airman

Chief Master Sergeant Norman Marous
- Born: October 17, 1943 (age 82); Pittsburgh, Pennsylvania
- Spouse: Virginia Beamer (m. 1963; d. 1983) Geraldine Gouza (m. 1984; d. 2021)
- Children: 3
- Military career
- Allegiance: United States of America
- Branch: United States Air Force
- Service years: 1962–2003
- Rank: Chief Master Sergeant
- Awards: Meritorious Service Medal(2); Air Force Commendation Medal(2); Army Commendation Medal; Air Force Achievement Medal(2); Army Achievement Medal

Norman Marous (born October 17, 1943) is a retired Chief master sergeant who served in the United States Armed Forces in various capacities, retiring as a member of the Vandenberg Air Force Base Ceremonial Honor Guard. With 41 years of service at the time of his retirement, Marous is the longest-serving non-commissioned officer on active service in the United States Air Force.

== Military biography ==
Born in Pittsburgh, Pennsylvania, he graduated from Allegheny Senior High School in 1962 and immediately enlisted in the Air Force. After Basic Training at Lackland Air Force Base, Texas, he attended Aircraft Instrument Training at Chanute Air Force Base, Illinois and was assigned to the 2855th Air Base Wing (Air Force Logistics Command), Olmsted Air Force Base, Pennsylvania. After initial release from active duty in 1967, he was assigned to the Continental Air Command, Air Force Reserve, Lowry Air Force Base, Colorado; before transferring to Air National Guard duty with the 112th Fighter-Interceptor Group (Air Defense Command), as an Avionics Technician and Weapons Loading Team Member for air-to-air missiles and rockets.

After 14 years in aircraft maintenance he was assigned as Maintenance Training Manager, 112th Tactical Fighter Group (Tactical Air Command), and subsequently as Noncommissioned Officer in Charge of Base Education and Training, Pittsburgh Air Reserve Station. His numerous additional duties have included, Acting First Sergeant; Unit Security Manager, Mobility Manager, Disaster Preparedness Manager, Honor Guard Member and Adjunct Instructor at the Air Force Honor Guard School, Bolling Air Force Base, Washington, DC. His Professional Military Education includes the United States Air Force Senior Noncommissioned Officer Academy, Maxwell Air Force Base, Alabama and the Noncommissioned Officer Academy at McGhee Tyson Air Base, Tennessee.

Concurrent with his 'Traditional' Reserve and Guard service he attended the University of Pittsburgh, majoring in Political Science, while pursuing a private sector business career in management positions of increasing responsibility at Mellon National Bank, BankAmerica, Automatic Data Processing Inc., the Schneider Group of Companies and General Nutrition Corporation. Those positions included Compensation Accounting Manager, National Account Systems Consultant and Client Relations Manager. For three years he hosted the show, "American Business World", on the Radio Information Service. He has also accumulated many recording credits as a narrator and authored numerous articles and columns.

In 1989 the Chief returned to active duty at The Pentagon, as Noncommissioned Officer in Charge of the Plans Branch, Counterdrug Division, Joint Staff (National Guard Bureau). Remaining in the joint counterdrug mission arena, he served as Operations Officer, Data Manager, Liaison Officer, Regional Coordinator, Executive to the Counterdrug Board and Liaison to the United States Air Force Auxiliary Civil Air Patrol Headquarters at Maxwell Air Force Base. After serving at the National Interagency Civil-Military Institute, as Counter-drug Liaison Officer, instructor, Assistant Public Affairs Officer and Senior Enlisted Advisor to the Director, he assumed the position of Western Regional Counterdrug Training Team Chief, at the Army's Camp San Luis Obispo, California. His career spans more than four decades of continuous unbroken military service.

Marous completed his service on the Vandenberg Air Force Base Ceremonial Honor Guard, where he was also on the Board of the Air Force Historical Foundation, Vice President of the Goddard Chapter of the Air Force Association, and Air Force Sergeants Association Division 13 First Trustee and as Director of the Joint Retired Member Center, serving all military components. He has been a State Vice President for Military Affairs and an Executive Board Member of the Air Force Association, as well as a chapter president. He served as a member, president and vice president of several Base Chapel Parish Councils (most recently at Vandenberg Air Force Base); the AFA-T.W.Anthony Chapter Advisor & Air Force Liaison and as Public Affairs Officer for Andrews Composite Squadron, Civil Air Patrol. Other volunteer activities have included leadership roles with Special Olympics, the Combined Federal Campaign, Air Force Aid Society and others. An Ordained Presbyterian Deacon, he has also been a Church Treasurer and Youth Programs Director.

== Awards ==
Marous' major Awards & Decorations include: 2003 USAF Person of the Year (CA), Citizen of Distinction in Community Service (MD), Distinguished Pennsylvanian of the Year, Outstanding Guardsman of the year, Pennsylvania Outstanding Airman of the Year, 112th Tactical Fighter Group Outstanding Noncommissioned Officer and Senior Noncommissioned Officer of the Year, Air Force Association National Medal of Merit and the Air Force Association Goddard Chapter Meritorious Service Award and Presidential Service Award, as well as three Exceptional Service Awards. He is a recipient of the Meritorious Service Medal, Air Force Commendation Medal, Army Commendation Medal, Air Force Achievement Medal, Army Achievement Medal and 56 other Federal & State Awards.

== Personal life ==
Marous is a Charter Sustaining Life Member of the Aerospace Education Foundation. He holds life memberships in the Air Force Historical Foundation, Air Force Association, Air Force Sergeants Association, Noncommissioned Officer Association, Noncommissioned Officer Academy Graduates Association, American Legion, Disabled American Veterans of America, National Guard Bureau Alumni Association and Enlisted Association; as well as membership in three Chief's Groups and other service organizations.

He was married to the former Geraldine Gouza, a retired school teacher. They have three children: Laura, a University of Pittsburgh graduate, is a teacher and spouse to James, Air Force Master Sergeant and Iraq War Veteran now stationed at McGuire Air Force Base, New Jersey. David, a Valley Forge Military Academy and Penn State University graduate is a Captain, who after serving in Iraq now Commands Alpha Battery, 1st Battalion, 22nd Field Artillery Regiment, Fort Sill, Oklahoma. Elizabeth, a Widner University graduate is a Nurse and Captain, now stationed at Fort Stewart, Georgia, who also served a year in Iraq. They have eight grandchildren: Joshua, Madeline, Ella, David, Christian, Grace, Bella, and Cora.
