= General of the Air Force =

Highest possible rank in the United States Air Force

- Rank flag of a General of the Air Force.

- General of the Air Force insignia
- Country: United States
- Service branch: United States Air Force
- Abbreviation: GAF
- Rank group: General officer
- Rank: Five-star
- NATO rank code: OF-10
- Pay grade: Special grade
- Formation: 7 May 1949
- Next lower rank: General
- Equivalent ranks: General of the Army (US Army); Fleet admiral (US Navy)

General of the Air Force (GAF) is a five-star general officer rank and is the highest possible rank in the United States Air Force. General of the Air Force ranks immediately above a general and is equivalent to General of the Army in the United States Army and fleet admiral in the United States Navy. The rank has only been held by one man, General Henry H. Arnold, who had served as head of the United States Army Air Forces during World War II. As at the time of his promotion, the Air Force was a component of the Army instead of its own branch, and as a consequence, the rank has not been first awarded to someone who is serving in the Air Force. Arnold retained the rank when the separate branch was created, and he was redesignated General of the Air Force in 1949.

== History ==
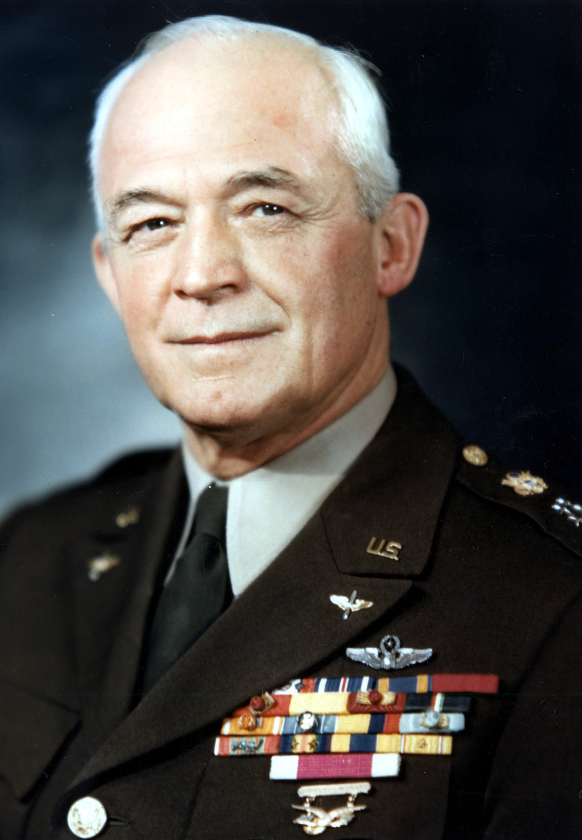
Henry "Hap" Arnold as a General of the Army. His rank was changed in 1949 to that of General of the Air Force.

General Henry H. Arnold, commanding general of the United States Army Air Forces, became the first airman to be promoted to the five-star rank of general of the Army on 21 December 1944. The four other individuals promoted to the rank of General of the Army, all from the Army Ground Forces, were chief of staff of the United States Army George C. Marshall, supreme commander of the South West Pacific Area Douglas MacArthur, supreme commander of Supreme Headquarters Allied Expeditionary Force Dwight D. Eisenhower and commander of the Twelfth United States Army Group Omar Bradley. Four Navy admirals were also promoted to the five-star rank of fleet admiral, including William D. Leahy, Chief of Staff to the Commander in Chief, Ernest King, Chief of Naval Operations and commander-in-chief, United States Fleet, Chester W. Nimitz, commander-in-chief of the Pacific Ocean Areas and United States Pacific Fleet, and William Halsey Jr., commander of the South Pacific Area.

General of the Army Arnold retained the rank after the U.S. Air Force gained its independence from the U.S. Army on 18 September 1947. On 7 May 1949, under Pub. L. 81–58, Henry Arnold's official U.S. rank was redesignated from General of the Army to General of the Air Force. General of the Air Force Arnold is the only individual in the U.S. Armed Forces to have held a five-star rank in two different services and is the only airman to have held a five-star rank.

The Air Force currently declares that General of the Air Force is an active rank and it could again be bestowed at the discretion of the United States Congress. However, the President, with consent from the Senate, may award a fifth star at any time they see fit.

== Rank senior to General of the Air Force ==
The only United States Armed Forces rank senior to General of the Air Force is General of the Armies. The rank of General of the Armies has only been granted to Generals John J. Pershing, George Washington and Ulysses S. Grant.

== See also ==
- List of United States four-star officers
- List of United States Air Force four-star generals
- List of United States military leaders by rank
- United States Air Force officer rank insignia
