= United States Air Force officer rank insignia =

The United States Air Force officer rank insignia in use today.

== Current insignia ==
US DoD pay grade	Special grade (Note: Reserved for wartime use only.)	O-10	O-9	O-8	O-7	O-6	O-5	O-4	O-3	O-2	O-1
NATO code	OF-10	OF-9	OF-8	OF-7	OF-6	OF-5	OF-4	OF-3	OF-2	OF-1
Insignia
Service dress uniform (Class A)
Service uniform (Class B)
Mess dress uniform
Title	General of the Air Force	General	Lieutenant general	Major general	Brigadier general	Colonel	Lieutenant colonel	Major	Captain	First lieutenant	Second lieutenant
Abbreviation (Note: No periods are used in actual grade abbreviation, only in press releases to conform with AP standards.)	GAF	Gen	Lt Gen	Maj Gen	Brig Gen	Col	Lt Col	Maj	Capt	1st Lt	2d Lt

United States Air Force officer rank insignia. The ranks are divided into three sections: company grade, field grade, and general officers. Company grade officers are those officers of grades O-1 to O-3. Field grade officers are those of grades O-4 to O-6. General officers are those of O-7 and above.

Currently, promotion from Second Lieutenant to First Lieutenant is virtually guaranteed after two years of satisfactory service. Promotion to Captain is virtually guaranteed after another two years of satisfactory service. Previously there was a Promotion Board to Captain, but that was discontinued in 2013. An officer's record is reviewed by a selection board at the Air Force Personnel Center at Randolph Air Force Base in San Antonio, Texas. This process occurs approximately between the nine- and eleven-year mark, where a certain percentage of Captains will be selected for Major. This process will repeat at the 13-16 year mark for promotion to Lieutenant Colonel and then around the twenty-year mark for promotion to Colonel.

The five-star grade General of the Air Force has only been held by General of the Air Force Henry H. Arnold. Federal law currently contains no provisions to promote an officer to five-star grade.

== Wearing of insignia ==
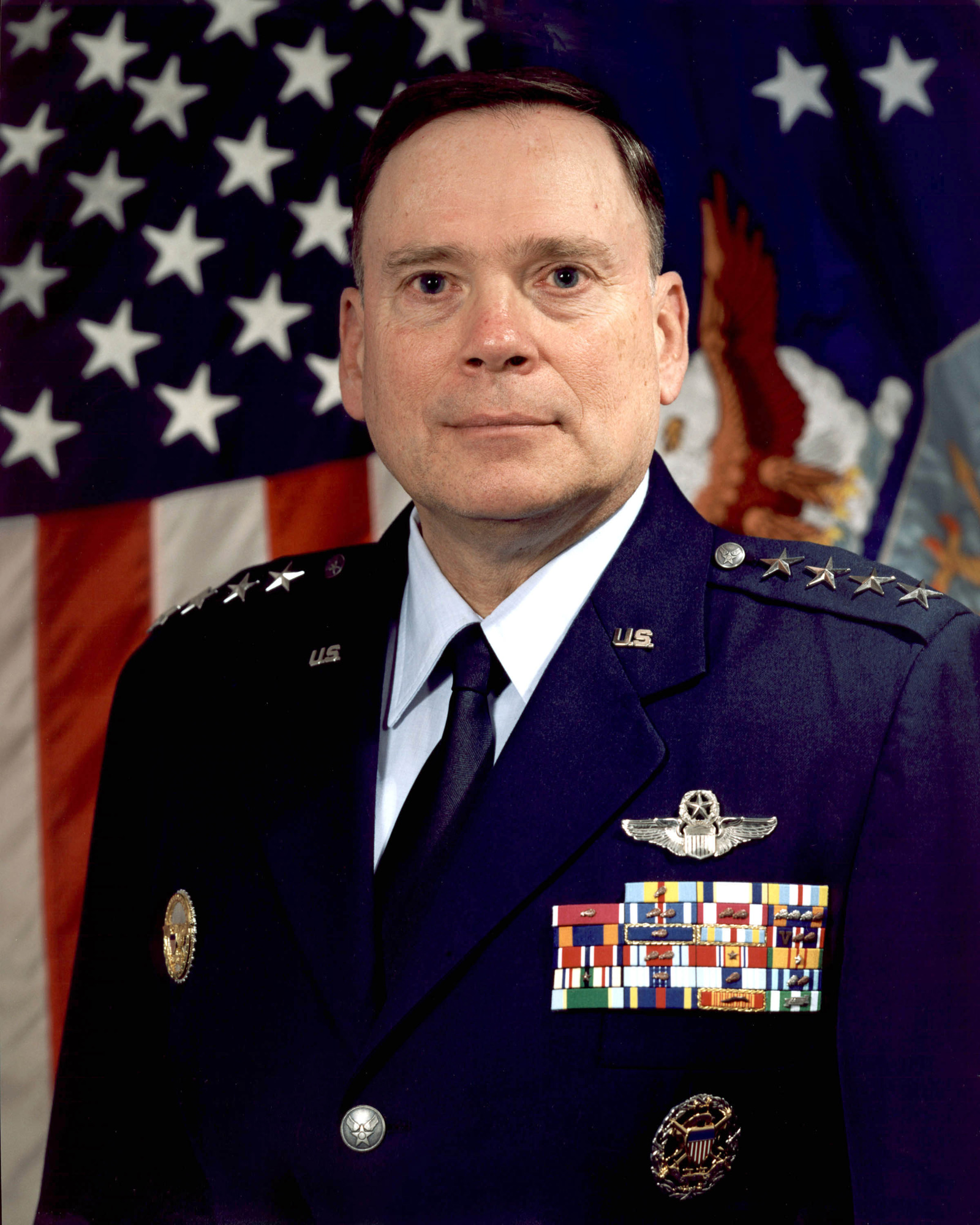
General John P. Jumper in the modern Air Force service dress

On the Air Force Mess Dress uniform, officer rank insignia are embroidered in silver or gold thread on detachable shoulder boards which are attached to the mess dress jacket. No rank insignia are worn on the mess dress shirt.

On the service dress uniform, metal rank insignia pins are worn on the epaulets of the Air Force Blue service dress jacket. Rank insignia are also worn on epaulets which slide onto the epaulet loops on the light blue shirt; the rank insignia is embroidered in silver or gold thread on an Air Force blue field. The slide-on epaulet for field-grade officers' shirts has a single line of silver piping toward the outer edge of the epaulet. The slide-on epaulet for general officers' shirts has silver piping on both the inner and outer edges of the epaulets. These slide-on epaulets are also worn on the cardigan and pull-over uniform sweaters. Unlike the Army, Navy, and Marine Corps, metal rank insignia for general officers consists of separate rather than conjoined stars.

The Flight Duty Uniform (FDU) features subdued cloth rank insignia sewn onto the shoulders. The Air Force flight cap is worn with the FDU and service dress uniforms (the service cap may also be worn with the service uniform). The flight cap is solid Air Force Blue for enlisted personnel, but features a solid silver edge braid for general officers, and an edge braid in a silver and blue diamond pattern for other officers. Officers wear a bright metal rank insignia toward the front edge of the (wearer's) left side of the flight cap.

On the Operational Camouflage Pattern (OCP) uniform rank is worn as a velcro patch on the center of the chest. Subdued cloth rank is worn on the front of the OCP patrol cap, above the bill. Air Force officers authorized to wear berets (Security Forces Officers, Special Tactics Officers, Combat Rescue Officers, and Combat Weather Officers) wear a bright metal rank insignia on the beret's flash.

Subdued rank insignia, as worn on the OCP and FDU, are designed to reduce visibility of the wearer under field conditions. The subdued versions of silver insignia are embroidered in dark blue thread on an olive-drab backing. The subdued versions of gold insignia are embroidered in brown thread on an olive-drab backing. On Desert FDUs and OCP uniforms, OCP patterned backing (or tan for the FDU) replaces the olive-drab backing (with black thread in place of dark blue thread). Subdued metal insignia are black and brown in place of silver and gold, respectively. General officers wear black stars as subdued rank.

Agents of the Air Force Office of Special Investigations normally do not wear uniforms while on duty, but even when in uniform they often do not wear rank insignia. However, when attending Professional Military Education courses, they do wear rank insignia.

== Past insignia for the McPeak Uniform ==
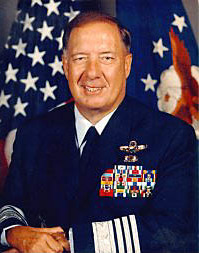
USAF general Chuck Horner wearing the short-lived silver rings rank insignia

The current Air Force officer rank names and insignia were taken from the Army upon the establishment of the Air Force as a separate service in 1947. The insignia have been essentially unchanged since then, except for a brief period during the 1990s, when then-Air Force Chief of Staff General Merrill A. McPeak redesigned the service dress uniform.

His redesign replaced the metal rank insignia for officers with silver braid on the sleeves, similar to the officer rank insignia now used by the US Navy and Coast Guard. This was similar to the rank insignia of the British Royal Air Force, the Canadian Armed Forces and other Commonwealth air forces. The "McPeak uniform" was very unpopular, drawing comparisons to the jackets worn by airline pilots, and the traditional shoulder rank insignia were reinstated to the service coat within a week of General McPeak's retirement in 1994.

Uniformed services pay grade	Special grade	O-10	O-9	O-8	O-7	O-6	O-5	O-4	O-3	O-2	O-1
Service Dress; Uniform Insignia
Title		General	Lieutenant General	Major General	Brigadier General	Colonel	Lieutenant Colonel	Major	Captain	First Lieutenant	Second Lieutenant
Abbreviation		Gen	Lt Gen	Maj Gen	Brig Gen	Col	Lt Col	Maj	Capt	1st Lt	2d Lt
NATO code	OF-10	OF-9	OF-8	OF-7	OF-6	OF-5	OF-4	OF-3	OF-2	OF-1

== Civil Air Patrol ==
Uniformed services pay grade	Special grade	O-10	O-9	O-8	O-7	O-6	O-5	O-4	O-3	O-2	O-1
Civil Air Patrol
Civil Air Patrol				Major general	Brigadier general	Colonel	Lieutenant colonel	Major	Captain	First lieutenant	Second lieutenant	Senior flight officer	Technical flight officer	Flight officer
NATO code	OF-10	OF-9	OF-8	OF-7	OF-6	OF-5	OF-4	OF-3	OF-2	OF-1

Senior members are members who joined CAP for the first time past the age of 18, or who are former cadets who transferred to the senior member program, which must happen by the cadet's 21st birthday. Senior members who have not yet turned 21 years are eligible for flight officer grades, which include flight officer, technical flight officer, and senior flight officer, after completion of Level 2, Part one of Senior Member training. There is no mandatory retirement age for CAP members, and there are no physical requirements for joining. Members may enter retired status after twenty years of service. The only physical requirements senior members must follow are the weight and grooming standards required in order to wear the United States Air Force-style uniforms. Senior members who do not meet the weight and grooming standards of the United States Air Force may wear alternative uniforms known as CAP Corporate uniforms.

Officer grades up to lieutenant colonel reflect progression in training and organizational seniority, rather than command authority. Because of this, it is not uncommon for senior members commanding groups and squadrons to have members of superior grades serving under them. Current, retired and former members of the United States Armed Forces may be promoted directly to the CAP grade equivalent to their military grade up to lieutenant colonel after completion of Level 2, Part one of Senior Member training, although some choose to follow the same standards as non-prior-service members. Except for a few exceptional cases, senior members are only promoted to the grade of CAP colonel upon appointment as a Region Commander, responsible for overseeing multiple states, or Wing Commander, responsible for the administration of CAP units across an entire state.

== See also ==
- United States Air Force enlisted rank insignia
- United States Air Force Warrant officer rank insignia
- United States Air Force Academy Cadet Insignia
