= Captain (United States O-3) =

Military rank of the United States

- U.S. Army, U.S. Air Force, and U.S. Space Force insignia of the rank of captain.

- U.S. Marine Corps insignia of the rank of captain.

- Shoulder boards (USA, USMC, USAF, USSF)
- Country: United States
- Service branch: U.S. Army; U.S. Marine Corps; U.S. Air Force; U.S. Space Force
- Abbreviation: CPT (Army); Capt (Marine Corps/ Air Force / Space Force)
- Rank group: Company Grade Officer
- NATO rank code: OF-2
- Pay grade: O-3
- Next higher rank: Major
- Next lower rank: First lieutenant
- Equivalent ranks: Lieutenant (U.S. Navy and U.S. Coast Guard)

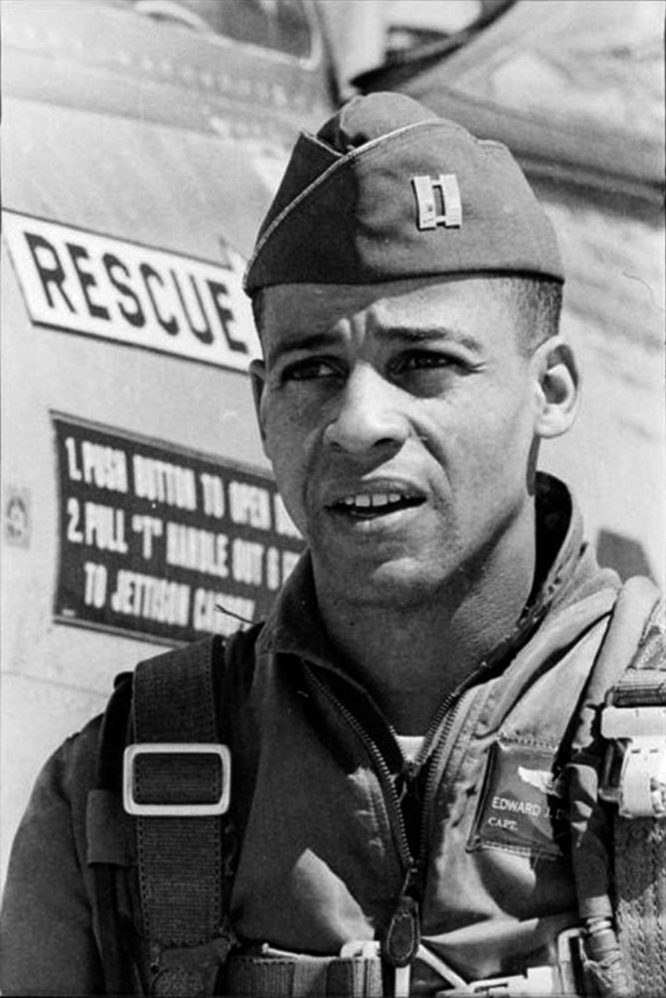
Captain Ed Dwight (USAF), with two-silver-bar insignia on his side cap.

Captain in the U.S. Army (USA), U.S. Marine Corps (USMC), U.S. Air Force (USAF), and U.S. Space Force (USSF) (abbreviated "CPT" in the USA and "Capt" in the USMC, USAF, and USSF) is a company-grade officer rank, with the pay grade of O-3. It ranks above first lieutenant and below major. It is equivalent to the rank of lieutenant in the Navy/Coast Guard officer rank system and is different from the higher Navy/Coast Guard rank of captain. The insignia for the rank consists of two silver bars, with slight stylized differences between the Army/Air Force version and the Marine Corps version.

== History ==
The U.S. military inherited the rank of captain from its British Army forebears. In the British Army, the captain was designated as the appropriate rank for the commanding officer of infantry companies, artillery batteries, and cavalry troops, which were considered as equivalent-level units. Captains also served as staff officers in regimental and brigade headquarters and as aides-de-camp to brigadiers and general officers. British Marine battalions also utilized captain as the appropriate rank of their constituent Marine companies. Therefore, American colonial militia and Provincial Regular units (e.g., First and Second Virginia Regiments), as well as colonial Marines, mirrored British Army and Marine organization and rank structure.

On July 23, 1775, General Washington decreed that captains would wear a "yellow or buff" cockade in their hats as their badge of rank. In 1779, the rank insignia for captains was changed to an epaulette worn of the right shoulder. Infantry captains wore a silver epaulette while all other captains wore a gold epaulette. Both company-grade officers and non-commissioned officers began wearing chevrons as rank insignia in 1821. The captain wore a single chevron, point up, above the elbow on each sleeve; again, the color was silver for infantry captains and gold for all other captains. In 1832, company-grade officers ceased wearing chevrons and reverted to a system of epaulettes (again silver for infantry and gold for all others); captains wearing an epaulette on each shoulder, but smaller and less elaborate than the field grade officer versions. In 1836, captains began wearing an insignia of two bars (gold for infantry and silver for all others). Finally, in 1872, all captains, regardless of branch, began to wear two silver bars. Today, there is a difference between the insignia of a Marine Corps captain and an Air Force or Army captain, but in 1941, the regulations of the army (AR 600-35,10 November 1941) showed that both services used the current Marine Corps/Navy style bars. But when the army switch to a pin-back style in 1942 it seems that is when the bars changed to the modern look.

== Description ==
=== Company commanders ===
An Army captain most often serves as a company commander leading 60-200 soldiers. He/she is responsible for the training, combat readiness, discipline and welfare of those soldiers. Captains can also serve as a battalion/squadron (cavalry) or brigade staff officer and may have an opportunity to command a company/battery (field and air defense artillery)/troop (cavalry). When given such a command, they bear the title company/battery/troop commander. U.S. Army Special Forces (12-member) Operational Detachments Alpha are also commanded by a captain, who has the title of "detachment commander."

Marine captains are company grade officers. These captains generally serve as staff officers in battalions/squadrons (aviation), regiments/aviation groups (MAG or MACG), or in MAGTFs (MEU and MEB) and typically have an opportunity to command companies, batteries (artillery and air defense) or various types of detachments, with the title billet of company commander, for the ground units, or detachment commander, for aviation units. In the Marine Raider Regiment, a captain, with the title of "team leader," commands a 14-man Marine Special Operations Team (MSOT). Marine captains also serve as executive officers (i.e., second-in-command) of infantry battalion weapons companies and some other larger combat logistics and aviation support units. Marine Aviation captains routinely serve as aircraft and air mission commanders, aircraft section and division leaders, aviation maintenance department division officers, and as officers-in-charge (OIC) of various combat logistics and aviation support functional and staff sections.

An Air Force captain's authority varies by group assignment. In an operations group, senior captains may be flight commanders while more junior captains may be heads of departments. In the maintenance or logistics and mission support groups they are almost always flight commanders. In the medical group, captains usually have limited administrative and command responsibility as captain is frequently the entry-level rank for most medical officers and dental officers.

In the Space Force, a captain typically has authority over a flight, and is referred to as a flight commander.

=== Staff officers ===
Captains of all four services routinely serve as instructors at service schools and combat training centers; aides-de-camp to general officers; liaison and exchange officers to other units, services, and foreign militaries; recruiting officers; students in advanced and graduate/post-graduate programs in Professional Military Education institutions and civilian universities; and on various types of special assignments.

=== Specialty branches ===
In Army and Air Force medical units, captain is the entry-level rank for those possessing a medical degree, or a doctorate in a healthcare profession. Other health care professions including nurse anesthetists, pharmacists, optometrists, veterinarians, and physician assistants, among others may start as first lieutenants promotable upon completion of initial entry training.

In Army and Air Force Judge Advocate General Corps, lawyers with a Juris Doctor degree and membership in the bar of at least one U.S. state or territory are appointed captains, or first lieutenants promotable upon completion of initial entry training.

However, in the Marine Corps Judge Advocates, after earning their commissions as unrestricted line officer second lieutenants, as well as earning an accredited Juris Doctor degree and passing a bar examination, enter active duty as first lieutenants and must complete the Marine Officer Basic Officer Course/The Basic School to qualify as rifle platoon commanders, before subsequently attending their MOS school prior to assignment to their first Marine Corps Judge Advocate billet and completing the minimum time in grade requirements for selection for and promotion to captain.

Chaplains usually enter at the rank of captain in the Army as they are required to possess a Master's of Divinity and be endorsed by recognized religious group. It is possible to enter the military as a chaplain's candidate as a 2nd Lieutenant while still completing the necessary education to become a chaplain. Air Force chaplains often begin as a 1st Lieutenant, but some may be initially commissioned as a captain due to their education and experience. The Air Force supplies all the chaplains to the Space Force. There are no Marine Corps chaplains as they get all their chaplains from the Navy.

== See also ==
- Police captain
- United States Army officer rank insignia
- United States Air Force officer rank insignia
