= United States Air Force enlisted rank insignia =

The chart below represents the current enlisted rank insignia of the United States Air Force.

US DoD pay grade	E-9 Special (Note: SEAC, CMSAF, and SEA all have E-9 pay grades but are given unique pay.)			E-9		E-8	E-7	E-6	E-5	E-4	E-3	E-2	E-1
NATO code	OR-9					OR-8	OR-7	OR-6	OR-5	OR-4	OR-3	OR-2	OR-1
Insignia													No insignia
Title	Senior Enlisted Advisor to the Chairman	Chief Master Sergeant of the Air Force	Senior Enlisted Advisor to the Chief of the National Guard Bureau	Command chief master sergeant	Chief master sergeant (Note: Air Force first sergeants are considered temporary and lateral ranks and are senior to their non-diamond counterparts. First sergeants revert to their permanent rank within their paygrade upon leaving assignment.)	Senior master sergeant	Master sergeant	Technical sergeant	Staff sergeant	Senior airman	Airman first class	Airman	Airman basic
Abbreviation	SEAC	CMSAF	SEA	CCC/CCM	CMSgt	SMSgt	MSgt	TSgt	SSgt	SrA	A1C	Amn	AB

While all Air Force military personnel are referred to as airmen, it can specifically refer to the pay grades of E-1 through E-4, which are below the level of non-commissioned officers (NCOs). Above the pay grade of E-4 (E-5 through E-9) all ranks fall into the category of NCO and are further subdivided into NCOs (E-5 and E-6) and senior NCOs (E-7 through E-9); the term junior NCO is sometimes used to refer to staff sergeants and technical sergeants (E-5 and E-6).

The Air Force and Space Force are the only ones of the six branches of the United States military where NCO status is now only achieved at the grade of E-5. Formerly, the grade of sergeant was obtained after a time as a senior airman and successful completion of the Air Force NCO School. In all other branches, NCO status can be achieved at the grade of E-4 (a corporal in the Army and Marine Corps, petty officer third class in the Navy and Coast Guard). However, E-4s in the Army with the rank of specialist are not NCOs. The Air Force mirrored the Army from 1976 to 2 May 1991 with an E-4 being either a senior airman wearing three stripes without a star or a sergeant (informally referred to as a "buck sergeant") which was noted by the presence of the central star and considered an NCO. Despite not being an NCO, a senior airman who has completed Airman Leadership School can be a supervisor.

== History ==
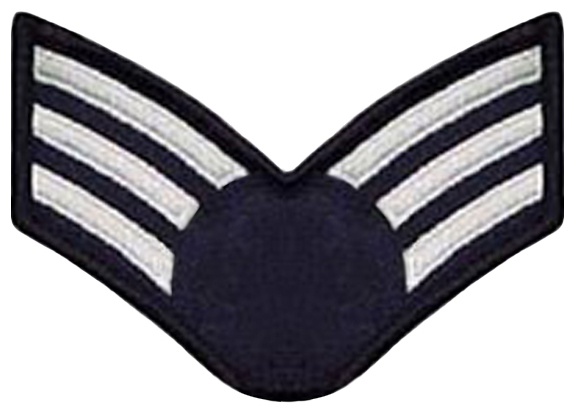
1976–1991 USAF E-4 (senior airman) rank insignia, without silver star in the middle

Rank insignia for senior NCOs in the USAF featured three rockers prior to 1991.

Although the United States Air Force came into being as an independent uniformed service with the National Security Act of 1947, it initially retained the previously used United States Army Air Forces’ rank structure and corresponding insignia. This rank structure provided for seven enlisted ranks: private, private first class, corporal/technician fifth grade, sergeant/technician fourth grade, staff sergeant/technician third grade, technical sergeant, and master sergeant/first sergeant. Additionally, Air Force personnel were still referred to as "soldiers". During World War II, many USAAF NCOs wore the Army Air Corps branch insignia of the winged propeller underneath their chevrons.

Changes to the rank structure were proposed almost immediately after the creation of the Air Force, but did not start occurring until the next year. In late 1947 and early 1948, new chevron designs were tested at Bolling Air Force Base. The style preferred was the one used today, the inverted chevron. Air Force Chief of Staff General Hoyt Vandenberg approved the new chevron on 9 March 1948. A new Air Force "Uxbridge blue" uniform, silver-gray-on-blue-backing stripes, and black leather boots replaced the U.S. Army Air Corps' olive drab uniform, olive drab-on-dark-blue-backing stripes, and russet leather boots in 1949. Old russet leather gear items like boots and holsters were re-dyed and polished black. Air Force personnel were allowed to wear their old World War II-pattern uniforms and rank insignia until July 1952. Recolored Army service stripes and overseas service bars were worn on the uniform until 1957.

Although the new chevrons were approved, the titles did not change. Two years passed before General Vandenberg, in February 1950, ordered all enlisted personnel in the Air Force be referred to as "airman" (singular) and "airmen" (plural) rather than "soldiers". A further two years would go by while the enlisted rank structure was studied and changes proposed. The end results finally became effective on 24 April 1952 with the release of a revised Air Force Regulation (AFR) 39–36. This revision changed the names of the enlisted ranks to basic airman, airman third class, airman second class, airman first class (with resultant loss of NCO status that was not restored until 1967), staff sergeant, technical sergeant and master sergeant.

With the new titles came a proposal for new rank insignia for airman third class through airman first class. The proposed insignia had horizontal stripes for airman third class through airman first class while NCOs kept their inverted chevrons. The purpose of the two different types of insignia was to more readily differentiate the airman and NCO tiers while increasing the prestige of the latter. These were not approved at the time of the release of the revised regulation. When they were finally approved by General Vandenberg in December 1952, procurement of these stripes was deferred until approximately June 1955. This change was eventually reversed, on 12 March 1956, by General Vandenberg's successor, General Twining. On 20 September 2021, the United States Space Force released several media graphics depicting the new rank insignia for enlisted personnel. The information sheets described the designs for the enlisted ranks took inspiration from Vandenberg's proposals from 1952, noted as "Vandenberg Stripes".

1952 proposed rank insignia for E4–E2
Airman 1st class

Airman 2nd class

Airman 3rd class

During his tenure, General Twining also approved the diamond insignia for first sergeants. This became available on 21 September 1955. With this approval, the foundations of the first seven ranks and insignia the Air Force uses today were in place.

The next major change came with the Military Pay Act of 1958. This established the pay grades of E-8 and E-9 but without corresponding rank titles. The titles of senior master sergeant and chief master sergeant were chosen between July and December 1958 after comments were solicited from the major Air Force commands of the day. After much discussion, the insignia for these two ranks were designed by simply adding one and two chevrons to the top of the master sergeant insignia (for E-8 and E-9 respectively), each stripe pointing up.

The rank of basic airman was renamed to airman basic on 5 February 1959, still with no insignia attached.

The next series of changes to Air Force enlisted ranks did not occur for almost eight years. In January 1967 the position of Chief Master Sergeant of the Air Force was created. This position gained its own special insignia, the chief master sergeant chevrons with a wreath encircling the center star. On 1 August 1967 the lower enlisted rank names changed (revised AFR 39–36 on 19 October 1967) renamed to airman third class, airman second class and airman first class to airman, airman first class and sergeant (known unofficially as "buck sergeant" by the NCO ranks at the time) respectively. This returned sergeant to the rank structure as the first step in the NCO tier as a retention move but required achievement of a 5-skill Air Force Specialty Code (AFSC) level. No changes to the respective insignias were made. (Note: On 1 July 1969 the Air Force Serial Number was changed to the member's social security number (SSAN). This change was for all grades and the three major U.S. military forces including guard and reserve components. The commandant of the USMC did not adopt the serial number change to his forces.)

In a 30 December 1975, directive the grade of sergeant was split into two separate ranks while retaining the grade of E-4. Senior airman was the last junior enlisted tier rank while sergeant remained the first rank in the NCO tier. The impetus behind this was to laterally promote senior E-4 airmen who were ready for NCO responsibilities but not prepared to take on the role of a staff sergeant. This permitted airmen who had not yet reached the AFSC 5-skill level to achieve the pay grade of E-4. To differentiate the two ranks, the directive changed the silver star in the center of airman, airman first class and senior airman changed to blue while the star on sergeant chevrons remained silver. Having two ranks within one grade mirrored the Army's specialist/corporal division of E-4. This dual role lasted until March 1991, when then Chief of Staff General McPeak terminated the rank of sergeant effective 2 May 1991. This termination was due in part to the manning reductions that occurred in the post–Cold War drawdowns of the early 1990s. The last of the "buck sergeants" would have either been promoted or discharged under High Year Tenure by December 1998.

The year 1991 also saw the last major change to the enlisted rank insignia. In October 1991 General McPeak and Chief Master Sergeant of the Air Force Pfingston announced that the senior NCO tier would have new chevron layouts and that all chevrons would have a white star in the center. The change in senior NCO chevrons was the first since chevrons came into being in 1948. Until that time, master sergeant had been composed of six inverted chevrons (six down) with none pointing up, senior master sergeant six down with one up and chief master sergeant six down with two up. The new layout changed the insignia to the current layout (see chart above). The second change, changing the star color to white, was actually two changes in one. It added a star to the airman through senior airman rank insignias where there had been none since 1 June 1976 (the blue star carried by these chevrons was the same color as the blue in the stripes giving the impression that the star was not there) and changing the silver star on the NCO and senior NCO chevrons to white.

CMSAF insignia changes
CMSAF chevrons (1967–1991)

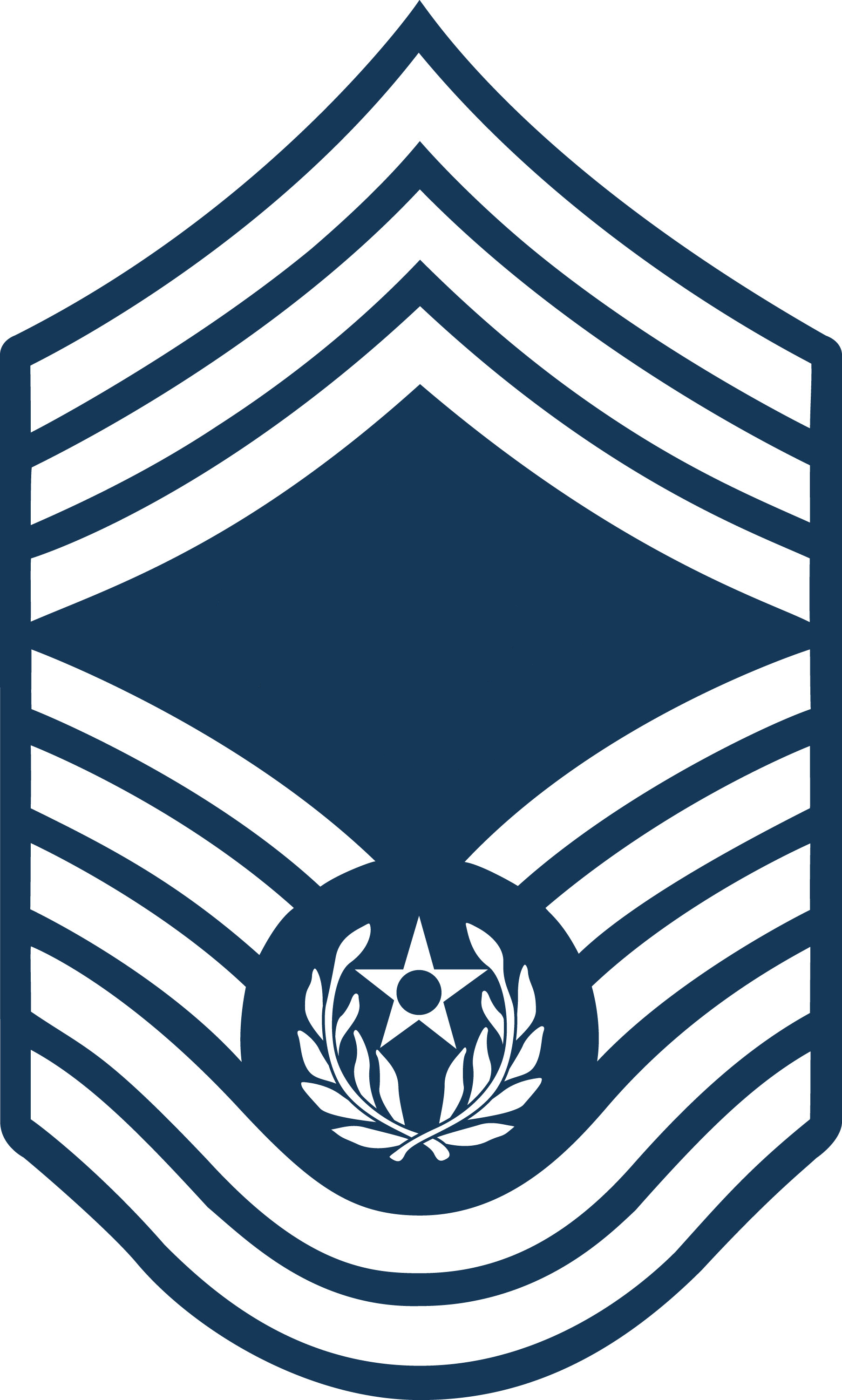
CMSAF chevrons (1991 – October 2004)

CMSAF chevrons (November 2004 – present)

In November 1998, the duty position of senior enlisted advisor was changed to command chief master sergeant. Along with the change, the addition of a star in the empty blue area between the chevrons was added to denote those holding this position.

In November 2004, the Chief Master Sergeant of the Air Force insignia was updated to include the Great Seal of the United States with a white star on either side. These additions were placed in the empty blue area between the chevrons.

In December 2019, the duty position of senior enlisted advisor to the chairman (SEAC) was given a unique rank insignia. Air Force Chief Master Sgt. Ramon Colon-Lopez, the fourth senior enlisted advisor to the chairman, is to be the first to wear the new Air Force version of the insignia.

SEAC
Special rank insignia for the United States Air Force

== Timeline of changes ==
This table shows changes in insignia, from 1947 until the present.

Uniformed services pay grade	Special			E-9			E-8		E-7		E-6		E-5		E-4		E-3		E-2	E-1
September; 1947	No equivalent																			No insignia
September; 1947	No equivalent								First sergeant	Master sergeant	Technical sergeant		Staff sergeant	Technician 3rd grade	Sergeant	Technician 4th grade	Corporal	Technician 5th grade	Private 1st class	Private
March; 1948	No equivalent																			No insignia
March; 1948	No equivalent								Master sergeant		Technical sergeant		Staff sergeant		Sergeant		Corporal		Private 1st class	Private
April; 1952	No equivalent																			No insignia
April; 1952	No equivalent								Master sergeant		Technical sergeant		Staff sergeant		Airman 1st class		Airman 2nd class		Airman 3rd class	Basic airman
September; 1954	No equivalent																			No insignia
September; 1954	No equivalent								First sergeant	Master sergeant	Technical sergeant		Staff sergeant		Airman 1st class		Airman 2nd class		Airman 3rd class	Basic airman
May; 1958	No equivalent																			No insignia
May; 1958	No equivalent			First sergeant	Chief master sergeant		First sergeant	Senior master sergeant	First sergeant	Master sergeant	First sergeant	Technical sergeant	Staff sergeant		Airman 1st class		Airman 2nd class		Airman 3rd class	Basic airman
February; 1959	No equivalent																			No insignia
February; 1959	No equivalent			First sergeant	Chief master sergeant		First sergeant	Senior master sergeant	First sergeant	Master sergeant	First sergeant	Technical sergeant	Staff sergeant		Airman 1st class		Airman 2nd class		Airman 3rd class	Airman basic
April; 1967																				No insignia
April; 1967	Chief master sergeant of the Air Force			First sergeant	Chief master sergeant		First sergeant	Senior master sergeant	First sergeant	Master sergeant	First sergeant	Technical sergeant	Staff sergeant		Airman 1st class		Airman 2nd class		Airman 3rd class	Airman basic
October; 1967																				No insignia
October; 1967	Chief master sergeant of the air force			First sergeant	Chief master sergeant		First sergeant	Senior master sergeant	First sergeant	Master sergeant	First sergeant	Technical sergeant	Staff sergeant		Sergeant		Airman 1st class		Airman	Airman basic
June; 1976																				No insignia
June; 1976	Chief master sergeant of the air force			First sergeant	Chief master sergeant		First sergeant	Senior master sergeant	First sergeant	Master sergeant	Technical sergeant		Staff sergeant		Sergeant	Senior airman	Airman 1st class		Airman	Airman recruit
March; 1991																				No insignia
March; 1991	Chief master sergeant of the Air Force			First sergeant	Chief master sergeant		First sergeant	Senior master sergeant	First sergeant	Master sergeant	Technical sergeant		Staff sergeant		Senior airman		Airman 1st class		Airman	Airman recruit
October; 1991																				No insignia
October; 1991	Chief master sergeant of the Air Force			First sergeant	Chief master sergeant		First sergeant	Senior master sergeant	First sergeant	Master sergeant	Technical sergeant		Staff sergeant		Senior airman		Airman first class		Airman	Airman basic
November; 1998																				No insignia
November; 1998	Chief master sergeant of the Air Force			Command chief master sergeant	First sergeant	Chief master sergeant	First sergeant	Senior master sergeant	First sergeant	Master sergeant	Technical sergeant		Staff sergeant		Senior airman		Airman first class		Airman	Airman basic
November; 2004																				No insignia
November; 2004	Chief master sergeant of the Air Force			Command chief master sergeant	First sergeant	Chief master sergeant	First sergeant	Senior master sergeant	First sergeant	Master sergeant	Technical sergeant		Staff sergeant		Senior airman		Airman first class		Airman	Airman basic
December; 2019																				No insignia
December; 2019	Senior enlisted advisor to the chairman	Chief master sergeant of the Air Force		Command chief master sergeant	First sergeant	Chief master sergeant	First sergeant	Senior master sergeant	First sergeant	Master sergeant	Technical sergeant		Staff sergeant		Senior airman		Airman first class		Airman	Airman basic
August; 2020																				No insignia
August; 2020	Senior enlisted advisor to the chairman	Chief master sergeant of the Air Force	Senior enlisted advisor to the chief of the National Guard Bureau	Command chief master sergeant	First sergeant	Chief master sergeant	First sergeant	Senior master sergeant	First sergeant	Master sergeant	Technical sergeant		Staff sergeant		Senior airman		Airman first class		Airman	Airman basic
NATO Code	OR-9						OR-8		OR-7		OR-6		OR-5		OR-4		OR-3		OR-2	OR-1

== Civil Air Patrol ==
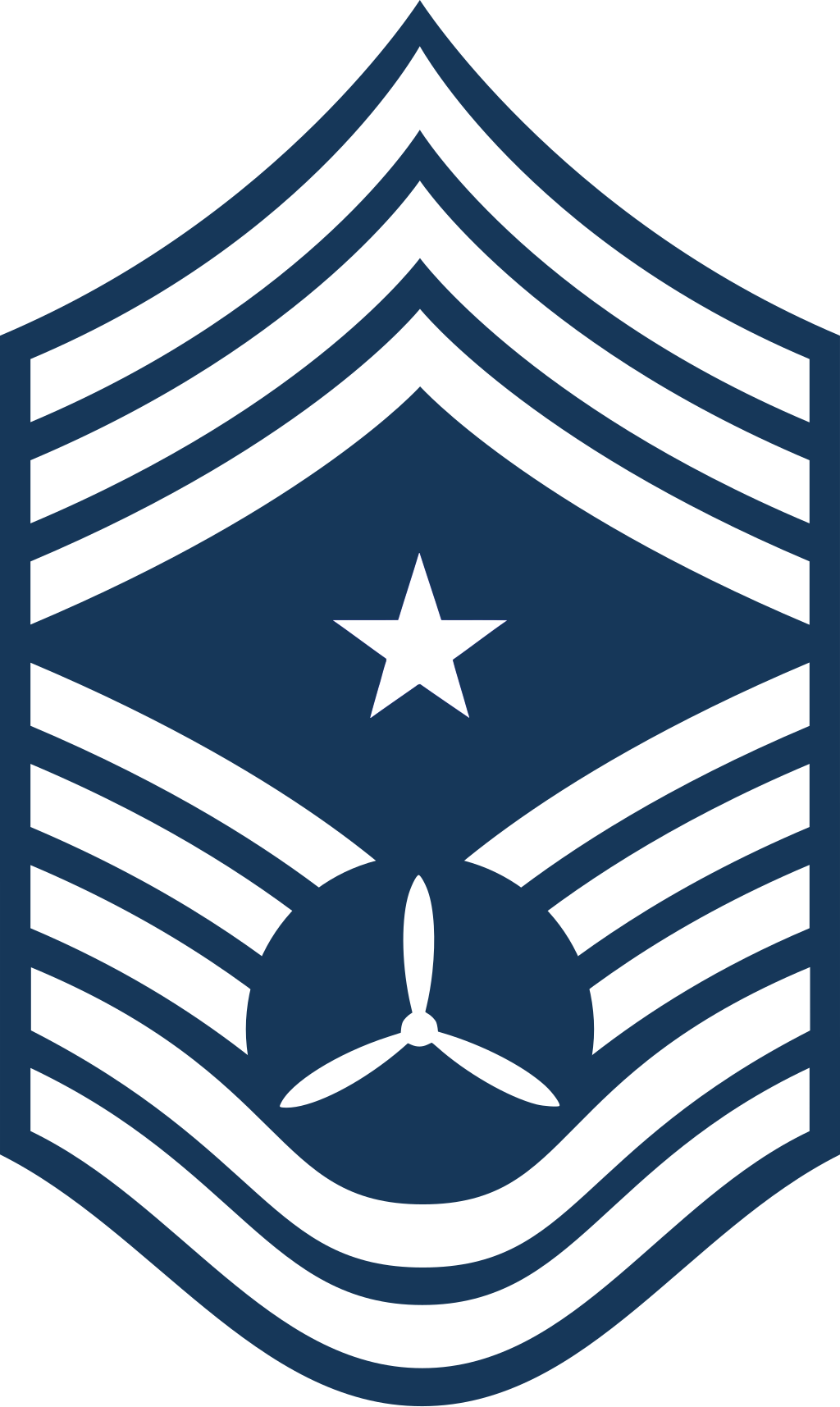
Uniformed services pay grade	Special	E-9	E-8	E-7	E-6	E-5	E-4	E-3	E-2	E-1
Civil Air Patrol
Civil Air Patrol	National Command Chief of the Civil Air Patrol	Chief master sergeant	Senior master sergeant	Master sergeant	Technical sergeant	Staff sergeant
NATO code	OR-9		OR-8	OR-7	OR-6	OR-5	OR-4	OR-3	OR-2	OR-1

Civil Air Patrol (CAP) is an all-volunteer, congressionally chartered, federally supported non-profit corporation that serves as the Air Force's civilian auxiliary. Although CAP is not a military service and its members are civilians, the Air Force authorizes CAP members to use an Air Force-style rank structure and wear Air Force-style uniforms.

Current and former military members holding an enlisted pay grade of E-4 or higher may choose to wear CAP noncommissioned officer rank instead of officer rank, after completion of Level 2, Part one of Senior Member training. They may join at the CAP grade equivalent to their military grade and can complete CAP's equivalent of professional military education (PME) to promote through the ranks similar to the Air Force.

During World War II, both officers and enlisted CAP members wore uniforms and rank insignia similar to those worn by the United States Army Air Forces. CAP members did not use rank when it was founded in December 1941, but when the Office of Civilian Defense authorized Army-style ranks in July 1942, enlisted CAP members wore khaki chevrons embroidered on a red background. However, wartime shortages sometimes forced members to make their own insignia by removing the stripes from Army chevrons and sewing them onto a red background. In November 1944, the CAP Handbook replaced the wartime-style khaki and red chevrons with the same chevrons used by Army enlisted personnel, which consisted of khaki strips on a blue background.

After the war, CAP was transferred from the Army to the newly created Air Force, and CAP members began wearing the Air Force's new uniforms and rank insignia. Although the Air Force adopted its current white-on-blue inverted chevrons in 1948, CAP members continued to wear Army-style insignia for several years. In 1951, Air Force Regulation 45-16 authorized CAP members to wear Army-style chevrons consisting of white stripes on a blue background on Air Force-style blue uniforms. In 1956, CAP Regulation 35-8 authorized members to wear the Air Force enlisted chevrons on all uniforms. They continued wearing Air Force chevrons until CAP phased out enlisted ranks in 1972, but they were authorized again in July 1984 for senior members who were current or former noncommissioned officers and who chose not to become CAP officers. When CAP updated its NCO program in October 2013, it introduced new rank insignia that included the letters "C-A-P" and replaced the Air Force star with CAP's three-bladed propeller.

During the tenure of CAP Chief Master Sgt. Todd H. Parsons, the Civil Air Patrol added a new insignia for the position of National Command Chief of the Civil Air Patrol. It is similar to the US Air Force Command Master Chief stripes, but with the USAF star replaced with the CAP Propeller. Unlike all the other senior CAP enlisted rank insignia, it does not contain the letters CAP in between the upper and lower chevrons, but has a single white star.

== See also ==
- United States Air Force officer rank insignia
- United States Air Force Warrant officer rank insignia
