= Enlisted Evaluation Report =

Evaluation form used by the United States Army

An enlisted evaluation report (EER) is an evaluation form used by the United States Army; the US Coast Guard also uses a document of the same title. The Army commissioned officer equivalent is the officer evaluation report (OER). The United States Navy equivalent is the fitness report (FITREP). The United States Air Force equivalent is the enlisted performance report (EPR).
