= Uniformed services pay grades of the United States =

Pay grades are used by the eight structurally organized uniformed services of the United States (Army, Marine Corps, Navy, Air Force, Space Force, Coast Guard, Public Health Service Commissioned Corps, and NOAA Commissioned Officer Corps), as well as the Maritime Service, to determine wages and benefits based on the corresponding military rank of a member of the services. While different ranks may be used among the eight uniformed services, pay grades are uniform and equivalent between the services and can be used to quickly determine seniority among a group of members from different services. They are also essential when determining a member's entitlements such as basic pay and allowances.

== Structure ==
Pay grades are divided into three groups: enlisted (E), warrant officer (W), and officer (O). Enlisted pay grades begin at E-1 and end at E-9; warrant officer pay grades originate at W-1 and terminate at W-5; and officer pay grades start at O-1 and finish at O-10. (Note: Before the death of General of the Army Omar Bradley in 1981, the pay grade of O-11 was authorized. Currently, O-10 is the highest authorized pay grade and pay grade O-11 appears nowhere in Title 10 of the US Code pertaining to authorized distribution of general/flag officers, nor within various documents establishing rates of pay.) Not all of the uniformed services use all of the grades; for example, the Coast Guard does not use the grades of W-1 and W-5, though it has the authority to.

Although authorized to do so, neither the National Oceanic and Atmospheric Administration Commissioned Officer Corps (NOAA Corps) nor the United States Public Health Service Commissioned Corps use any of the enlisted or warrant officer grades. Additionally, while not officially part of the uniformed services as defined by U.S. law, the Maritime Service (which provides officers serving in the Maritime Administration and as administrators and instructors at the U.S. Merchant Marine Academy (USMMA), and the six state-operated maritime academies) is also authorized, but does not currently employ, enlisted or warrant officer grades.

Officers in pay grades O-1, O-2, and O-3 with more than four years of prior cumulative service (creditable toward both length of service and retirement) in an enlisted or warrant officer grade are paid "... the special rate of basic pay for pay grade O-1E, O-2E, or O-3E," respectively. This benefit does not affect their rank and is used simply for reward and incentive purposes in recognition of their prior enlisted (or warrant officer) experience. A cumulative total of 1,440 days of creditable Federal active duty and/or reserve inactive duty for training days is required to qualify.

The pay grade of W-1 is normally reserved for officers appointed using a "warrant" rather than a "commission" by the secretary of defense or by each of the service secretaries, using authority delegated from the president, to an intermediate rank between enlisted non-commissioned officers and commissioned officers (starting at W-2). However, appointments to this grade can be made by commission by the service secretaries, defense secretary, or the president, but this is more uncommon. By law, regulation, and traditional customs and courtesies across the military services, warrant officers serving in pay grade W-1 have the same privileges as commissioned officers (with certain exceptions grounded in the distinction required in the Constitution that all "officers of the United States" be commissioned, which affects the command authority and specific standing of W-1's under the Uniform Code of Military Justice (UCMJ) and the Manual for Courts-Martial).

While cadets and midshipmen directly appointed by the president to four of the Federal Service Academies (U.S. Military Academy; U.S. Naval Academy; U.S. Air Force Academy; U.S. Coast Guard Academy) are members of the Regular Component of their Service, serving on active duty, they hold neither a commission nor a warrant of appointment, nor do they hold an enlisted grade or rank. U.S. statutes no longer include any pay grade for cadets or midshipmen; as "inchoate officers" appointed using the Appointments Clause of the U.S. Constitution as "inferior officers," they are recognized as having only a precedence below the most junior warrant officer, and above the enlisted grades, and almost entirely lack any authority over any other servicemembers (including other cadets and midshipmen) except for specific internal Academy functions, or very narrowly drawn training purposes while serving with their Service for leadership and skills development.

Those appointed to attend the U.S. Merchant Marine Academy (the fifth Federal Service Academy), by the administrator of the Maritime Administration (within the Department of Transportation), will also be appointed by the secretary of the Navy directly as Midshipmen, U.S. Navy Reserve, without enlistment. Additionally, the Service Secretaries will appoint the cadets or midshipmen of the Senior Reserve Officers Training Corps (ROTC), but unlike the cadets and midshipmen of each Federal Service Academy, ROTC cadets and midshipmen are first enlisted into the reserve component of their respective service. Cadets and midshipmen from both the USMMA and ROTC are appointed as "inchoate officers" without a commission or warrant, but unlike the other four Federal service academies, they are also appointed under Article II as "inferior officers" in their respective reserve component, and only serve on active duty during authorized training events (typically the "Sea Year" for USMMA midshipmen, or for ROTC during the summers between years of college). They share the ill-defined precedence, and lack of statutory pay grade, of cadets and midshipmen of the Academies, and have even less apparent authority (since they are generally not in any official duty status) beyond their internal USMMA and ROTC requirements, although they—like the cadets and midshipmen serving in the Regular Component at the Federal Service Academies—have the innate potential to command troops in emergencies, and otherwise perform duties far beyond their academic environment, as required by competent authorities.

The basic pay rate for both Academy and non-active duty ROTC cadets and midshipmen is $1,272.20, effective 1 January 2023, which is "the monthly rate equal to 35 percent of the basic pay of a commissioned officer in the pay grade O–1 with less than two years of service."

== NATO equivalents ==
The enlisted grades correspond with the NATO military rank codes, with E-1 being equivalent to Other Rank 1 (OR-1), E-2 equivalent to OR-2, and so on. The officer grades are all one higher than their NATO equivalent (except O-1) as the O-1 and O-2 grades are both equivalent to the NATO code of OF-1. Hence O-3 is equivalent to OF-2, O-4 is equivalent to OF-3, and so on. U.S. warrant officer grades (W-1 through W-5) are depicted in the NATO system as WO-1 through WO-5. The United States is the only nation that has officers in this category.

== Enlisted ==
Rank by branch of service
Uniformed services pay grade	Special			E-9			E-8		E-7		E-6	E-5	E-4		E-3	E-2	E-1
United States Army																	No insignia
United States Army	Senior Enlisted Advisor to the Chairman	Sergeant Major of the Army	Senior Enlisted Advisor to the Chief of the National Guard Bureau	Command sergeant major		Sergeant major	First sergeant	Master sergeant	Sergeant first class		Staff sergeant	Sergeant	Corporal	Specialist	Private first class	Private	Private
United States Marine Corps																	No insignia
United States Marine Corps	Senior Enlisted Advisor to the Chairman	Sergeant Major of the Marine Corps		Sergeant major		Master gunnery sergeant	First sergeant	Master sergeant	Gunnery sergeant		Staff sergeant	Sergeant	Corporal		Lance corporal	Private first class	Private
United States Navy	SEAC	MCPON		FMCPO	FMCPO	E-9	E-8	E-8	E-7		E-6	E-5	E-4		E-3	E-2	No insignia
United States Navy	Senior Enlisted Advisor to the Chairman	Master Chief Petty Officer of the Navy		Fleet/force master chief petty officer	Command master chief petty officer	Master chief petty officer	Command senior chief petty officer	Senior chief petty officer	Chief petty officer		Petty officer first class	Petty officer second class	Petty officer third class		Seaman	Seaman apprentice	Seaman recruit
Uniformed services pay grade	Special			E-9			E-8		E-7		E-6	E-5	E-4		E-3	E-2	E-1
United States Air Force																	No insignia
United States Air Force	Senior Enlisted Advisor to the Chairman	Chief Master Sergeant of the Air Force	Senior Enlisted Advisor to the Chief of the National Guard Bureau	Command Chief Master Sergeant	First sergeant	Chief master sergeant	First sergeant	Senior master sergeant	First sergeant	Master sergeant	Technical sergeant	Staff sergeant	Senior airman		Airman first class	Airman	Airman basic
United States Space Force																	
United States Space Force	Senior Enlisted Advisor to the Chairman	Chief Master Sergeant of the Space Force		Chief master sergeant			Senior master sergeant		Master sergeant		Technical sergeant	Sergeant	Specialist 4		Specialist 3	Specialist 2	Specialist 1
United States Coast Guard	MCPOCG			MCPOCG	CMC	MCPO	E-8		E-7		E-6	E-5	E-4		E-3	E-2	E-2
United States Coast Guard	Master Chief Petty Officer of the Coast Guard			Area-level Command Master Chief Petty Officer	Command master chief petty officer	Master chief petty officer	Senior chief petty officer		Chief petty officer		Petty officer first class	Petty officer second class	Petty officer third class		Seaman	Seaman apprentice	Seaman recruit
Uniformed services pay grade	Special			E-9			E-8		E-7		E-6	E-5	E-4		E-3	E-2	E-1

== Warrant officer ==
Rank by branch of service
Uniformed services pay grade	W-5	W-4	W-3	W-2	W-1
United States Army					
United States Army	Chief warrant officer 5	Chief warrant officer 4	Chief warrant officer 3	Chief warrant officer 2	Warrant officer 1
United States Marine Corps					
United States Marine Corps	Chief warrant officer 5	Chief warrant officer 4	Chief warrant officer 3	Chief warrant officer 2	Warrant officer 1
United States Navy					
United States Navy	Chief warrant officer 5	Chief warrant officer 4	Chief warrant officer 3	Chief warrant officer 2	Warrant officer 1
United States Air Force					
United States Air Force	Chief warrant officer 5	Chief warrant officer 4	Chief warrant officer 3	Chief warrant officer 2	Warrant officer 1
U.S. Coast Guard					
U.S. Coast Guard		Chief warrant officer 4	Chief warrant officer 3	Chief warrant officer 2	
Uniformed services pay grade	W-5	W-4	W-3	W-2	W-1

Schedule 8 - Pay of the Uniformed Services Part I--Monthly Basic Pay ($) (as of 1 January 2024)
Pay Grade	Years of service (computed under 37 U.S.C. 205)																																			
Pay Grade	< 2 Years		2–3 Years		3–4 Years		4–6 Years		6–8 Years		8–10 Years		10–12 Years		12–14 Years		14–16 Years		16–18 Years		18–20 Years		20–22 Years		22–24 Years		24–26 Years		26–30 Years		30–34 Years		34–38 Years		Over 38	
W-1	3,739	.80	4,143	.00	4,250	.70	4,479	.60	4,749	.90	5,148	.30	5,334	.30	5,595	.30	5,850	.90	6,052	.20	6,237	.60	6,462	.90	6,462	.90	6,462	.90	6,462	.90	6,462	.90	6,462	.90	6,462	.90
W-2	4,260	.90	4,663	.80	4,787	.70	4,873	.20	5,149	.20	5,578	.50	5,791	.80	6,001	.20	6,257	.40	6,457	.80	6,639	.00	6,856	.70	6,998	.70	7,111	.80	7,111	.80	7,111	.80	7,111	.80	7,111	.80
W-3	4,815	.60	5,015	.70	5,222	.10	5,289	.00	5,504	.40	5,928	.90	6,370	.80	6,579	.00	6,819	.90	7,067	.40	7,513	.80	7,814	.70	7,994	.70	8,186	.10	8,447	.10	8,447	.10	8,447	.10	8,447	.10
W-4	5,273	.10	5,671	.50	5,834	.40	5,994	.60	6,270	.60	6,543	.60	6,820	.20	7,235	.40	7,599	.90	7,946	.70	8,231	.10	8,508	.30	8,914	.50	9,248	.70	9,629	.70	9,821	.70	9,821	.70	9,821	.70
W-5																							9,375	.60	9,851	.10	10,205	.70	10,597	.20	11,128	.20	11,683	.50	12,269	.10

== Officer ==
Rank by branch of service
Uniformed services pay grade	Special grade	O-10	O-9	O-8	O-7	O-6	O-5	O-4	O-3	O-2	O-1
United States Army	General of the Army	General	Lieutenant general	Major general	Brigadier general	Colonel	Lieutenant colonel	Major	Captain	First lieutenant	Second lieutenant
United States Army	General of the Army	General	Lieutenant general	Major general	Brigadier general	Colonel	Lieutenant colonel	Major	Captain	First lieutenant	Second lieutenant
United States Marine Corps											
United States Marine Corps		General	Lieutenant general	Major general	Brigadier general	Colonel	Lieutenant colonel	Major	Captain	First lieutenant	Second lieutenant
United States Navy											
United States Navy	Fleet admiral	Admiral	Vice admiral	Rear admiral	Rear admiral (lower half)	Captain	Commander	Lieutenant commander	Lieutenant	Lieutenant (junior grade)	Ensign
United States Air Force											
United States Air Force	General of the Air Force	General	Lieutenant general	Major general	Brigadier general	Colonel	Lieutenant colonel	Major	Captain	First lieutenant	Second lieutenant
Uniformed services pay grade	Special grade	O-10	O-9	O-8	O-7	O-6	O-5	O-4	O-3	O-2	O-1
United States Space Force											
United States Space Force		General	Lieutenant general	Major general	Brigadier general	Colonel	Lieutenant colonel	Major	Captain	First lieutenant	Second lieutenant
United States Coast Guard											
United States Coast Guard		Admiral	Vice admiral	Rear admiral	Rear admiral (lower half)	Captain	Commander	Lieutenant commander	Lieutenant	Lieutenant (junior grade)	Ensign
United States Public Health Service											
United States Public Health Service		Admiral	Vice admiral	Rear admiral	Rear admiral (lower half)	Captain	Commander	Lieutenant commander	Lieutenant	Lieutenant (junior grade)	Ensign
NOAA											
NOAA			Vice admiral	Rear admiral	Rear admiral (lower half)	Captain	Commander	Lieutenant commander	Lieutenant	Lieutenant (junior grade)	Ensign
Uniformed services pay grade	Special grade	O-10	O-9	O-8	O-7	O-6	O-5	O-4	O-3	O-2	O-1

Schedule 8 - Pay of the Uniformed Services Part I--Monthly Basic Pay ($) (as of 1 January 2024)
Pay Grade	Years of service (computed under 37 U.S.C. 205)																																	
Pay Grade	< 2 Years		2–3 Years		3–4 Years		4–6 Years		6–8 Years		8–10 Years		10–12 Years		12–14 Years		14–16 Years		16–18 Years		18–20 Years		20–22 Years		22–24 Years		24–26 Years		26–30 Years		30–34 Years		Over 34 Years	
O-1 (Note: Rates do not apply to commissioned officers who have been credited with over 4 years (i.e., at least 4 years and 1 day) of active duty service as an enlisted member or as a warrant officer or as both an enlisted member and a warrant officer.)	3,826	.20	3,982	.80	4,814	.70	4,814	.70	4,814	.70	4,814	.70	4,814	.70	4,814	.70	4,814	.70	4,814	.70	4,814	.70	4,814	.70	4,814	.70	4,814	.70	4,814	.70	4,814	.70	4,814	.70
O-2	4,408	.50	5,020	.80	5,782	.80	5,978	.10	6,100	.80	6,100	.80	6,100	.80	6,100	.80	6,100	.80	6,100	.80	6,100	.80	6,100	.80	6,100	.80	6,100	.80	6,100	.80	6,100	.80	6,100	.80
O-3	5,102	.10	5,783	.70	6,241	.80	6,806	.10	7,132	.80	7,490	.70	7,721	.70	8,102	.10	8,301	.00	8,301	.00	8,301	.00	8,301	.00	8,301	.00	8,301	.00	8,301	.00	8,301	.00	8,301	.00
O-4	5,803	.20	6,717	.30	7,166	.40	7,265	.40	7,681	.50	8,127	.90	8,684	.10	9,116	.10	9,416	.70	9,589	.50	9,689	.10	9,689	.10	9,689	.10	9,689	.10	9,689	.10	9,689	.10	9,689	.10
O-5	6,725	.70	7,576	.50	8,100	.90	8,199	.60	8,527	.20	8,722	.50	9,153	.00	9,469	.80	9,878	.10	10,501	.80	10,799	.10	11,093	.10	11,426	.70	11,426	.70	11,426	.70	11,426	.70	11,426	.70
O-6 (Note: Basic pay for O-6 and below is limited by Level V of the Executive Schedule in effect during Calendar Year 2024 which is $15,000.00.)	8,067	.90	8,863	.20	9,444	.90	9,444	.90	9,481	.20	9,887	.40	9,941	.40	9,941	.40	10,506	.30	11,505	.00	12,091	.20	12,677	.10	13,010	.70	13,348	.50	14,002	.80	14,282	.40	14,282	.40
O-7	10,638	.90	11,133	.00	11,361	.90	11,544	.00	11,872	.80	12,198	.30	12,574	.20	12,948	.90	13,325	.40	14,506	.50	15,504	.30	15,504	.30	15,504	.30	15,504	.30	15,584	.10	15,895	.80	15,895	.80
O-8	12,803	.70	13,223	.70	13,501	.80	13,579	.20	13,926	.90	14,506	.50	14,641	.80	15,192	.60	15,351	.30	15,825	.90	16,512	.90	17,145	.60	17,568	.60	17,568	.60	17,568	.60	18,008	.40	18,458	.10
O-9 (Note: Basic pay for an O-7 to O-10 is limited by Level II of the Executive Schedule in effect during Calendar Year 2024 which is $18,491.70 per month. This includes officers serving as Chairman or Vice Chairman of the Joint Chiefs of Staff (JCS), Chief of Staff of the Army, Chief of Naval Operations, Chief of Staff of the Air Force, Commandant of the Marine Corps, Chief of Space Operations, Commandant of the Coast Guard, Chief of the National Guard Bureau, or commander of a unified or specified combatant command (as defined in 10 U.S.C. 161(c)).)																							18,096	.00	18,357	.30	18,491	.70	18,491	.70	18,491	.70	18,491	.70
O-10 (Note: For officers serving as Chairman or Vice Chairman of the Joint Chiefs of Staff, Chief of Staff of the Army, Chief of Naval Operations, Chief of Staff of the Air Force, Commandant of the Marine Corps, Chief of Space Operations, Commandant of the Coast Guard, Chief of the National Guard Bureau, or commander of a unified or specified combatant command (as defined in 10 U.S.C. 161(c)), basic pay for this grade (as of 2016, the latest year for which this information could be found ) was calculated to be $21,147.30 per month, regardless of cumulative years of service computed under 37 U.S.C. 205. Nevertheless, actual basic pay for these officers is limited to the rate of basic pay for level II of the Executive Schedule in effect during calendar year 2023, which is $17,675.10 per month.)																							18,491	.70	18,491	.70	18,491	.70	18,491	.70	18,491	.70	18,491	.70

Schedule 8 - Pay of the Uniformed Services Part I--Monthly Basic Pay ($) (as of 1 January 2024)
Pay Grade	Years of service (computed under 37 U.S.C. 205)															
Pay Grade	4–6 Years		6–8 Years		8–10 Years		10–12 Years		12–14 Years		14–16 Years		16–18 Years		Over 18 Years	
O-1E	4,814	.70	5,141	.10	5,331	.30	5,525	.70	5,716	.50	5,978	.10	5,978	.10	5,978	.10
O-2E	5,978	.10	6,100	.80	6,294	.90	6,622	.80	6,876	.60	7,065	.00	7,065	.00	7,065	.00
O-3E	6,806	.10	7,132	.80	7,490	.70	7,721	.70	8,102	.10	8,423	.40	8,607	.90	8,859	.00

== See also ==
- List of comparative military ranks
- Ranks and insignia of NATO
- General Schedule (US civil service pay scale)
- Military compensation
