= Technical sergeant =

Military enlisted rank used in the US and Philippine Armed Forces

Technical sergeant is the name of two current and two former enlisted ranks in the United States Armed Forces, as well as in the U.S. Civil Air Patrol. Outside the United States, it is used only by the Philippine Army, Philippine Air Force, and the Philippine Marine Corps.

== Philippines ==
The rank of technical sergeant is used by the Armed Forces of the Philippines. It is a enlisted personnel rank used by Philippine Army, Philippine Air Force and Philippine Marine Corps (under the Philippine Navy). The rank stands above the rank of staff sergeant and below master sergeant.

Technical sergeant insignia
Philippine Army

Technical sergeant insignia
Philippine Air Force

Technical sergeant insignia
Philippine Marine Corps

== United States ==
Technical sergeant
- Technical sergeant insignia
- Country: United States
- Service branch: United States Air Force; United States Space Force
- Rank group: Non-commissioned officer
- NATO rank code: OR-6
- Pay grade: E-6
- Formation: 1920 (USA); 2021 (USSF)
- Abolished: 1948 (USA); 1958 (USMC)
- Next higher rank: Master sergeant (USAF and USSF)
- Next lower rank: Staff sergeant (USAF); Sergeant (USSF)
- Equivalent ranks: Staff sergeant (USA & USMC); Petty officer first class (Navy & USCG)

Related articles
- History: Sergeant first class

Technical sergeant is a rank in the United States Air Force, United States Space Force, and Civil Air Patrol. It is a former rank in the United States Army and United States Marine Corps.

=== Army ===
The rank of technical sergeant existed from after World War I until 1948 when the rank was renamed sergeant first class. In 1920 the army combined several battalion/squadron level "staff" NCO ranks, including battalion quartermaster sergeant, battalion supply sergeant, ordnance sergeant, hospital sergeant, three grades of master sergeant (junior grade), and six additional senior-level technical and specialist ranks into the new technical sergeant rank. In 1944 when rifle squad leaders became staff sergeants, platoon sergeants were promoted to technical sergeants. In 1948 the army renamed technical sergeant as sergeant first class.

Technical sergeant insignia, U.S. Army (1920–1948)

=== Marine Corps ===
Technical sergeant was a rank in the United States Marine Corps until 1958. From 1941 until 1946, the rank was equivalent to grade 2, ranking with gunnery sergeant and other technical ranks. From 1947 until 1958, the rank was reclassified as E-6 and became the sole rank in this grade. The rank gunnery sergeant replaced it and elevated to E-7 after the reorganization of grades in 1959.

Technical sergeant insignia, U.S. Marine Corps (1941–1946)

Technical sergeant insignia, U.S. Marine Corps (1946–1959)

=== Air Force ===
Technical sergeant, "tech sgt" or "TSgt" in informal parlance, is the sixth enlisted rank (pay grade E-6) in the U.S. Air Force, just above staff sergeant and below master sergeant. A technical sergeant is a noncommissioned officer and abbreviated as TSgt (with no period in official USAF and other military correspondence). Official terms of address are "technical sergeant" or "sergeant", although many use "tech sergeant" in informal situations.

==== Civil Air Patrol ====
The Civil Air Patrol (CAP), a non-profit corporation Congressionally chartered to operate as the civilian auxiliary of the U.S. Air Force, has a quasi-military structure which includes the rank of technical sergeant. The grade of technical sergeant is above staff sergeant and beneath master sergeant. Former military enlisted personnel who held the rank of technical sergeant in the United States Armed Forces may retain that rank as members of the CAP.

Cadets in the Civil Air Patrol can hold the grade of cadet technical sergeant (abbreviated C/TSgt). The grade of cadet technical sergeant is above cadet staff sergeant and beneath cadet master sergeant. Cadet technical sergeants typically serve as flight sergeants

Civil Air Patrol technical sergeant insignia

Civil Air Patrol cadet technical sergeant insignia

=== Space Force ===
On February 1, 2021, the United States Space Force announced its permanent rank structure, establishing the grade of technical sergeant as its permanent E-6 grade. This continued its usage from the Air Force. The grade of technical sergeant is above sergeant and beneath master sergeant.

== See also ==
- United States military pay
- United States Air Force enlisted rank insignia
- United States Army enlisted rank insignia of World War I
- United States Army enlisted rank insignia of World War II
