= Chief master sergeant =

Military rank

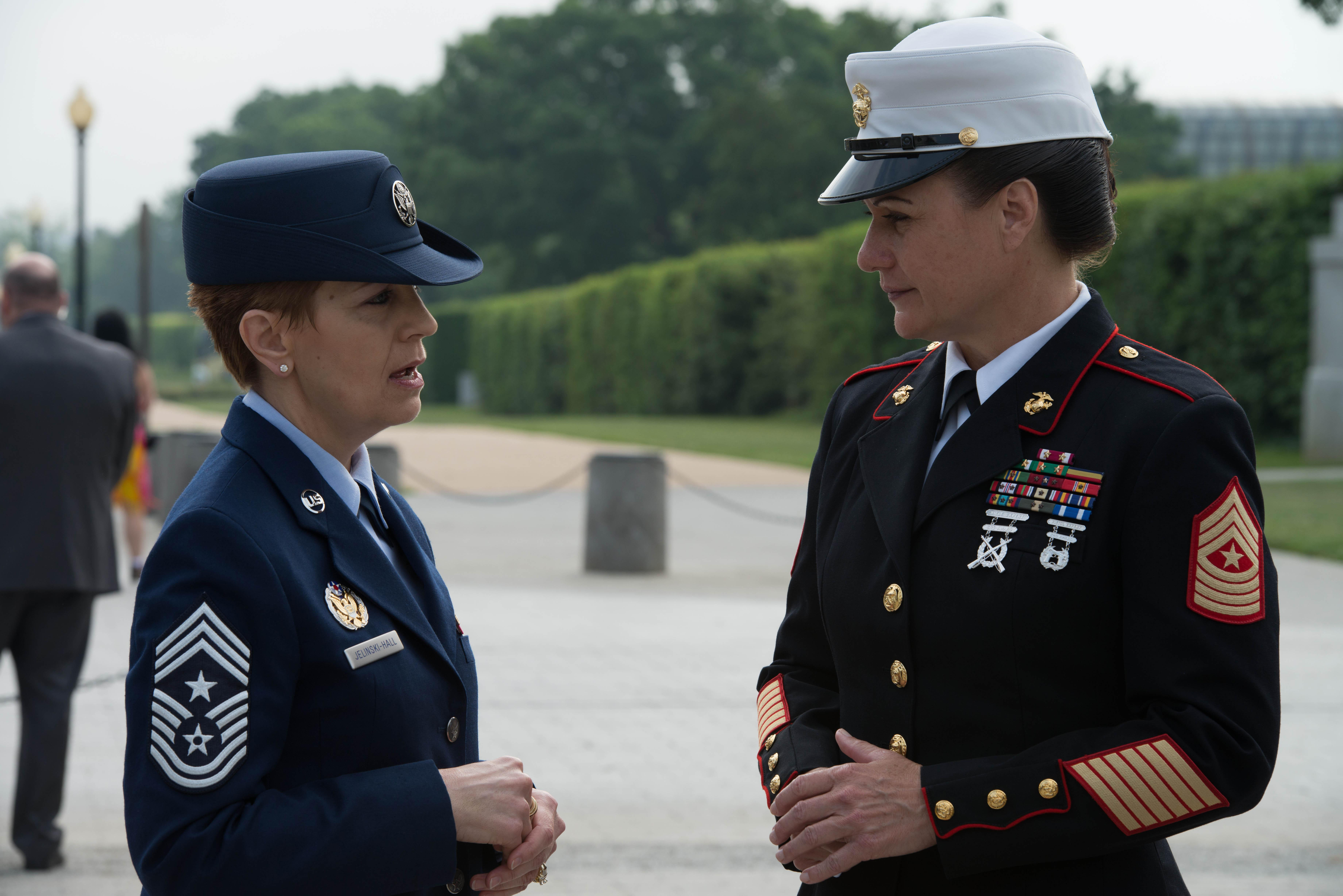
A command chief master sergeant in the United States Air Force, left, speaking with a sergeant major in the United States Marine Corps

A chief master sergeant is the military rank for a senior non-commissioned officer in the armed forces of some countries.

== Philippines ==
=== Philippine armed forces ===
Chief master sergeant
- Army, air force and marine insignia
- Country: Philippines
- Service branch: Philippine Army; Philippine Air Force; Philippine Marine Corps
- Rank group: Senior non-commissioned officer
- Next lower rank: Senior master sergeant
- Equivalent ranks: Master chief petty officer

Since 2004, as part of the ongoing modernization of the Armed Forces of the Philippines, chief master sergeant has been the highest attainable rank for enlisted personnel of the Philippine Army, the Philippine Air Force, and the Philippine Marine Corps (a component of the Philippine Navy).

Above the rank is that of first chief master sergeant, also created in 2004 and bestowed on the most veteran non-commissioned officer who has served in the aforementioned service branches.

The rank of chief master sergeant stands above that of senior master sergeant. The equivalent naval rating is that of master chief petty officer.

=== Philippine National Police ===
As of February 8, 2019, a new ranking classification for the Philippine National Police was adopted, eliminating confusion among previous ranks. The enabling law for the ranking is Republic Act 11200 which was signed by President Rodrigo Duterte, amending the section of the Department of the Interior and Local Government Act of 1990 that refers to the ranking classification of the Philippine National Police.

The rank stands above that of police senior master sergeant and below police executive master sergeant.

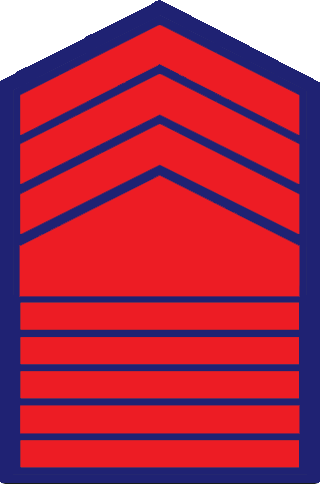
Police Chief master sergeant
(P/CMSg) insignia,
Philippine National Police

== United States ==
Chief Master Sergeant
- Air Force and Space Force insignia
- Country: United States
- Service branch: U.S. Air Force; U.S. Space Force
- Abbreviation: CMSgt
- Rank group: Non-commissioned officer
- NATO rank code: OR-9
- Pay grade: E-9
- Formation: 1958
- Next higher rank: Chief Master Sergeant of the Air Force (USAF); Chief Master Sergeant of the Space Force (USSF)
- Next lower rank: Senior master sergeant
- Equivalent ranks: Sergeant major (USA); Master gunnery sergeant (USMC); Master chief petty officer (USN and USCG

Chief master sergeant (abbreviated as CMSgt) is the ninth, and highest, enlisted rank in the United States Air Force and the United States Space Force, just above senior master sergeant, and is a senior non-commissioned officer rank. A chief master sergeant sometimes is referred to as a "chief."

Attaining the rank of chief master sergeant is the pinnacle of an Air Force or Space Force enlisted person's career. Some chief master sergeants manage the efforts of all enlisted personnel within their unit or major subsection while others run major staff functions at higher headquarters levels. All chief master sergeants are expected to serve as mentors for non-commissioned officers and junior enlisted members, and to serve as advisers to unit commanders and senior officers.

By federal law, no more than 1.25% of the Air Force enlisted force may hold the rank of chief master sergeant.

=== Special duty positions ===
Chief master sergeant serving as first sergeant.

==== First sergeant ====
The E-9 pay grade of first sergeant is a special duty rank held by a senior enlisted member of a military unit who reports directly to the unit commander or deputy commander of operations. This positional billet is held by a chief master sergeant and is denoted on the rank insignia by a lozenge (known colloquially as a "diamond"). Often referred to as the "first shirt", or "shirt", the first sergeant is responsible for the morale, welfare, and conduct of all the enlisted members in a squadron and is the chief adviser to the squadron commander concerning the enlisted force. While neither the Air Force or Space Force has a permanent first sergeant rank, those who hold these positional billets are given more authority than their non-diamond counterparts. "The first sergeant works directly for and derives authority from the unit commander and serves a critical link for the commander within the unit."

==== Group senior enlisted leaders ====
In the Air Force, group senior enlisted leaders (SEL), formerly known as a group superintendent, fall under special reporting identifier coding with a 9G100 Air Force specialty code. Group superintendents provide leadership, management, and guidance in organizing, equipping, training, and mobilizing groups to meet home station and expeditionary mission requirements. Group superintendents work closely with their group commanders and command chief master sergeants to prepare the enlisted force to best execute mission requirements. They manage and direct resource activities as well as interpret and enforce policies and applicable directives. They also establish control procedures to meet mission goals and standards. Additionally, they recommend or initiate actions to improve organizational effectiveness and efficiency as well as ensure that the management of personnel and resources are consistent with current practices and procedures in support of a wing's mission. They resolve issues between subordinate squadrons, other groups, wing staff, and outside agencies, and they perform other duties as directed by their group commanders.

==== Squadron senior enlisted leader ====
The duty position of squadron senior enlisted leader is the senior enlisted advisor to a unit commander and provides the parent organization(s) with subject matter expertise on the unit's capabilities.

==== Wing Weapons Manager ====
In the Air Force, the Wing Weapons Manager (WWM) is a wing's focal point for all weapons loading and armament systems-related matters and serves as the functional manager for all assigned 2W1X1 (Aircraft Armament Systems Specialist) The WWM's primary efforts focus on compliance, continuity, and standardization. The WWM is a (Chief Enlisted Manager code 2W100) command master sergeant assigned directly to the MXG/CC (Maintenance Group Commander). Weapons activities required to support the generation of peacetime training sorties generally do not reinforce primary combat skills. Therefore, the WWM plays a key role in ensuring that the unit is able to produce combat-loaded aircraft. The WWM is charged with providing technical and managerial advice to senior leaders in matters of weapons loading and armament systems. The WWM coordinates with the Aircraft Maintenance Squadrons, Weapons Sections, Armament Flight, Wing Safety, Wing Weapons and Tactics Officer, Munitions Squadron/Flight, and other unit agencies on weapons-related matters. The WWM is a certifying official and evaluator for weapons-loading task certifications and qualifications.

Command chief master sergeant

=== Senior enlisted advisors ===
==== Command Chief Master Sergeant ====
The position of command chief master sergeant (CCM) is unique, as it is considered a rank and billet. Formerly, the billets were called senior enlisted advisors and were held by a chief master sergeant. These billets were turned into the permanent rank of command chief master sergeants in November 1998. Command chief master sergeants serve as the senior enlisted advisors to commanders at key levels of command; these include wings, numbered air forces, field operating agencies, and major commands. In a joint command, when an Air Force Chief fills a United States Department of Defense-nominated Command senior enlisted advisor position (see note), that individual is also designated as a "command chief." Command chiefs advise their unit commanders on all enlisted matters, including all issues affecting the command's mission and operations, and the readiness, training, utilization, morale, technical, professional development, and quality of life of all enlisted members in the organization. Command chiefs hold a reporting identifier of 9E000. CCMs provide leadership to the enlisted force and are the functional managers for group superintendents and first sergeants in their organizations.

=== Historical notes ===
Chief master sergeant insignia (1958–1994)

Although the Air Force had been an independent service since 1947, the rank of chief master sergeant did not come into being until the authorization of the Military Pay Act of 1958. This act established the pay grades of E-8 and E-9 in the United States armed forces, but without specifying titles for those pay grades. It was not until late 1958 that the title "chief master sergeant" and the accompanying rank insignia were adopted.

The original chief master sergeant rank insignia, used from 1958 to 1994, consisted of two chevrons on top, three stripes in the middle, and three rockers on the bottom.

Until his retirement in 2003, Chief Master Sergeant Norman Marous was the Air Force's most senior chief master sergeant, having served in the Air Force since 1962. Marous left active duty in 1967 to spend 22 years in the United States Air Force Reserve and National Guard before returning to active duty as a chief master sergeant in 1989. He retired in 2003 with 41½ years of service. He is the only person authorized to wear two longevity ribbons, due to the space required for the number of multiple award devices authorized.

=== Civil Air Patrol ===
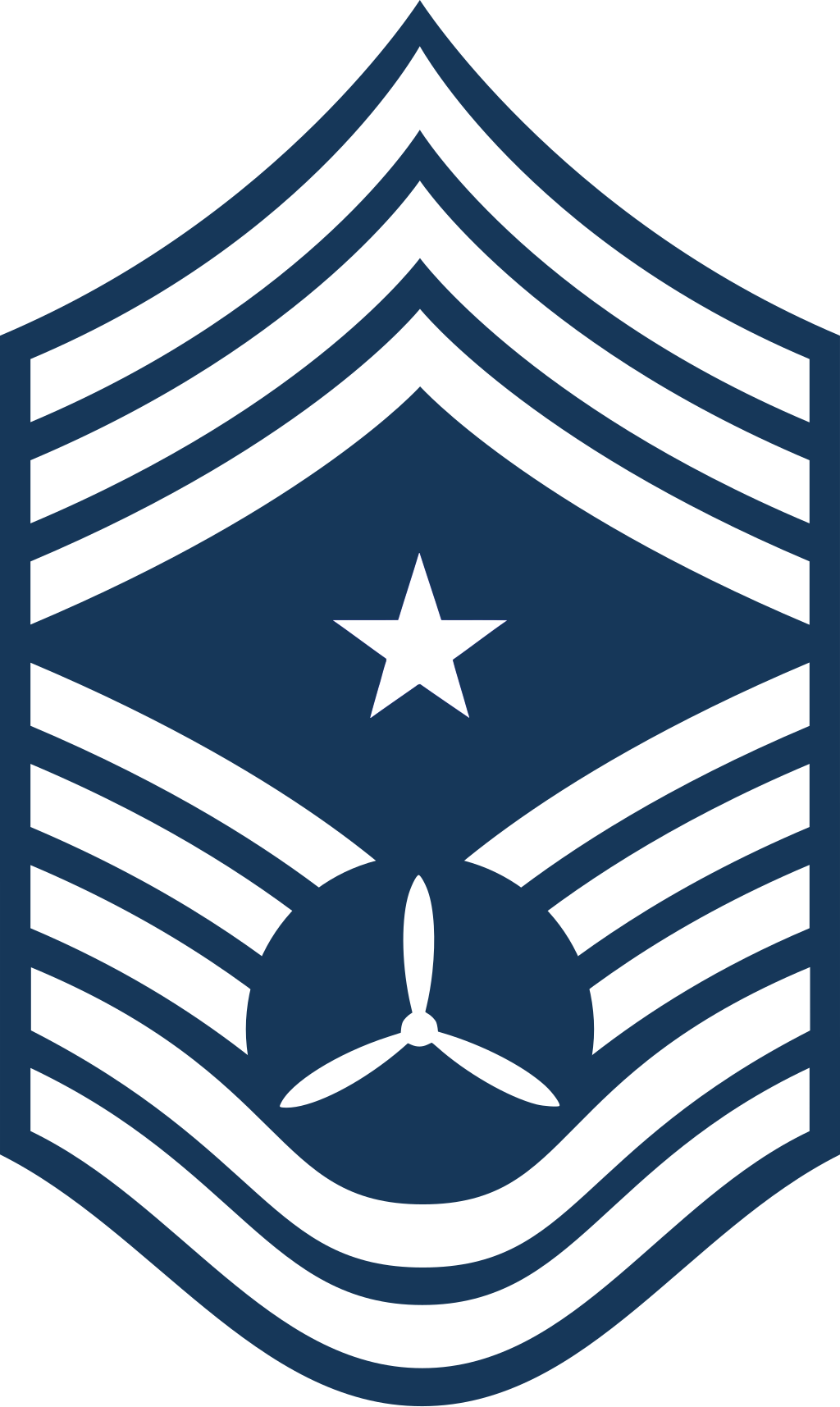
National Command Chief of the CAP Insignia

Civil Air Patrol chief master sergeant insignia

The Civil Air Patrol (CAP), a non-profit corporation Congressionally chartered to operate as the civilian auxiliary of the U.S. Air Force, has a quasi-military structure which includes the rank of chief master sergeant. It is the most senior CAP enlisted rank. Former military enlisted personnel who held the rank of chief master sergeant may retain that rank as members of the CAP.

During the tenure of CAP Chief Master Sgt. Todd H. Parsons, the Civil Air Patrol added a new insignia for the position of National Command Chief of the Civil Air Patrol. It is similar to the US Air Force Command Master Chief stripes, but with the USAF star replaced with the CAP Propeller. Unlike all the other senior CAP enlisted rank insignia, it does not contain the letters CAP in between the upper and lower chevrons, but has a single white star.

== See also ==
- Sergeant
- United States military pay
- Chief Master Sergeant of the Air Force
- Chief Master Sergeant of the Space Force

== Sources ==
- Air Force Instruction 36-2618, The Enlisted Force Structure (archive )
- Technical Sergeant Spink, Barry L. "A Chronology of the Enlisted Rank Chevron of the United States Air Force, 19 February 1992." Air Force Historical Research Agency.
