= Senior master sergeant =

Military rank

Senior master sergeant is the military rank for a senior non-commissioned officer in the armed forces of some countries.

== Philippines ==
=== Armed forces ===
Senior master sergeant is the second-highest attainable rank for enlisted personnel of the Philippine Army, the Philippine Air Force and the Philippine Marine Corps (a component of the Philippine Navy).

The rank stands above that of master sergeant and below that of chief master sergeant.

Senior master sergeant insignia
Philippine Army

Senior master sergeant insignia
Philippine Air Force

Senior master sergeant insignia
Philippine Marine Corps

=== Philippine National Police ===
As of February 8, 2019, a new ranking classification for the Philippine National Police was adopted, eliminating confusion of old ranks. The Police Senior master sergeant is third highest non-commissioned officer rank on the service. It stands above the rank of Police Master sergeant and below the Police Chief master sergeant.

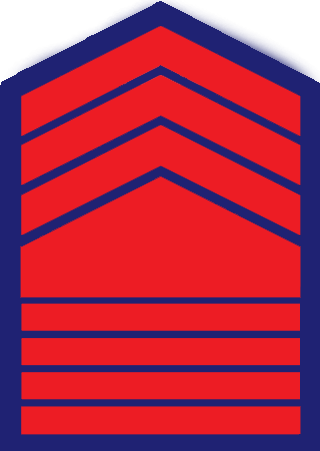
Police Senior master sergeant (P/SMSg)
Philippine National Police

== United States ==
Senior master sergeant
- Air Force and Space Force insignia
- Country: United States
- Service branch: U.S. Air Force; U.S. Space Force
- Abbreviation: SMSgt
- Rank group: Non-commissioned officer
- NATO rank code: OR-8
- Pay grade: E-8
- Formation: 1958
- Next higher rank: Chief master sergeant
- Next lower rank: Master sergeant
- Equivalent ranks: Master Sergeant (Army & USMC); Senior Chief Petty Officer (Navy & USCG)

Senior master sergeant (abbreviated SMSgt) is the second-highest enlisted rank (pay grade E-8) in the United States Air Force and United States Space Force, just above master sergeant and below chief master sergeant, and is a senior non-commissioned officer (SNCO).

According to Air Force Instruction 36-2618, The Enlisted Force Structure:

SMSgts are key, experienced, operational leaders, skilled at merging their personnel's talents, skills, and resources with other teams' functions to most effectively accomplish the mission. SMSgts continue to develop their leadership and management skills in preparation for expanded responsibilities and higher leadership positions. SMSgts normally operate at the operational level of leadership.

Promotion to senior master sergeant is the most difficult enlisted promotion to attain in the Air Force and Space Force. It is the second enlisted grade in which results of a central promotion board are the only factor in selection for promotion. Usually, fewer than ten percent of eligible master sergeants are selected for promotion to senior master sergeant in most years. Selectees typically have vast technical and leadership experience gained from a broad variety of assignments at both line and staff functions during their careers. Additionally, the successful candidate typically has completed an associate or bachelor's degree in their Air Force and Space Force specialty as well as the Senior Non-commissioned Officer Correspondence Course, and has had his or her latest performance report endorsed by a senior rater, usually a colonel or brigadier general.

in preparation for promotion to the rank of chief master sergeant, senior master sergeants typically assume superintendent duties, overseeing enlisted members' efforts to accomplish a major segment of a unit's mission. They are expected to serve as mentors for non-commissioned and junior commissioned officers.

U.S. Air Force senior master sergeant insignia serving as first sergeant.

Public Law 107-107, the "National Defense Authorization Act", establishes senior enlisted strength levels for all branches of the United States Armed Forces. Currently, only 2.5 percent of the Air Force's total active duty enlisted strength may hold this rank.

Senior master sergeants are sometimes referred to by the nickname of "Senior." In the past, this was a casual nickname that was inappropriate in formal situations. However, on 12 July 2018, new Air Force regulations were issued that made "Senior" one of the official terms of address for senior master sergeants, in addition to the pre-existing "Senior Master Sergeant" and "Sergeant" addresses.

Senior master sergeants in the first sergeant special duty serve as first sergeants of larger units than those employing master sergeants as first sergeants. These first sergeants (pay grades E-7 to E-9) are referred to officially as "First Sergeant" (regardless of their pay grade), and unofficially as "First Shirt" or simply "Shirt".

=== Historical note ===
Senior master sergeant insignia (obsolete).

Although the Air Force has been an independent service since 1947, the rank of senior master sergeant did not come into being until the authorization of the Military Pay Act of 1958. This act established the pay grades of E-8 and E-9 but without title. It was not until late 1958 that the title of "senior master sergeant" (and the accompanying rank insignia) was decided upon after the enlisted force was polled. At that time, the senior master sergeant rank had only a single chevron above and six below, and a chief master sergeant two above and six below. In 1994 the Air Force changed its non-commissioned officer insignia so that a maximum of five stripes were placed on the bottom of the chevrons, adding one above to each of the top three grades, resulting in the present form.

=== Civil Air Patrol ===
Civil Air Patrol senior master sergeant insignia.

The Civil Air Patrol (CAP), a non-profit corporation Congressionally chartered to operate as the civilian auxiliary of the U.S. Air Force, has a quasi-military structure which includes the rank of senior master sergeant. The grade of senior master sergeant is below chief master sergeant and above master sergeant. Former military enlisted personnel who held the rank of senior master sergeant in the United States Armed Forces may retain that rank as members of the CAP.

== See also ==
- Sergeant
- United States military pay
- U.S. Air Force enlisted rank insignia
