= List of United States Marine Corps acronyms and expressions =

This is a list of acronyms, expressions, euphemisms, jargon, military slang, and sayings in common or formerly common use in the United States Marine Corps. Many of the words or phrases have varying levels of acceptance among different units or communities, and some also have varying levels of appropriateness. Many terms also have equivalents among other service branches that are not acceptable among Marines, but are comparable in meaning. Many acronyms and terms have come into common use from voice procedure use over communication channels, translated into the phonetic alphabet, or both. Many are or derive from nautical terms and other naval terminology. Most vehicles and aircraft have a formal acronym or an informal nickname; those are detailed in their own articles.

The scope of this list is to include words and phrases that are unique to or predominantly used by the Marine Corps or the United States Naval Service. Recent joint operations have allowed terms from other military services to leak into the USMC lexicon, but can be found with their originating service's slang list, see the "See also" section.

== 0–9 ==
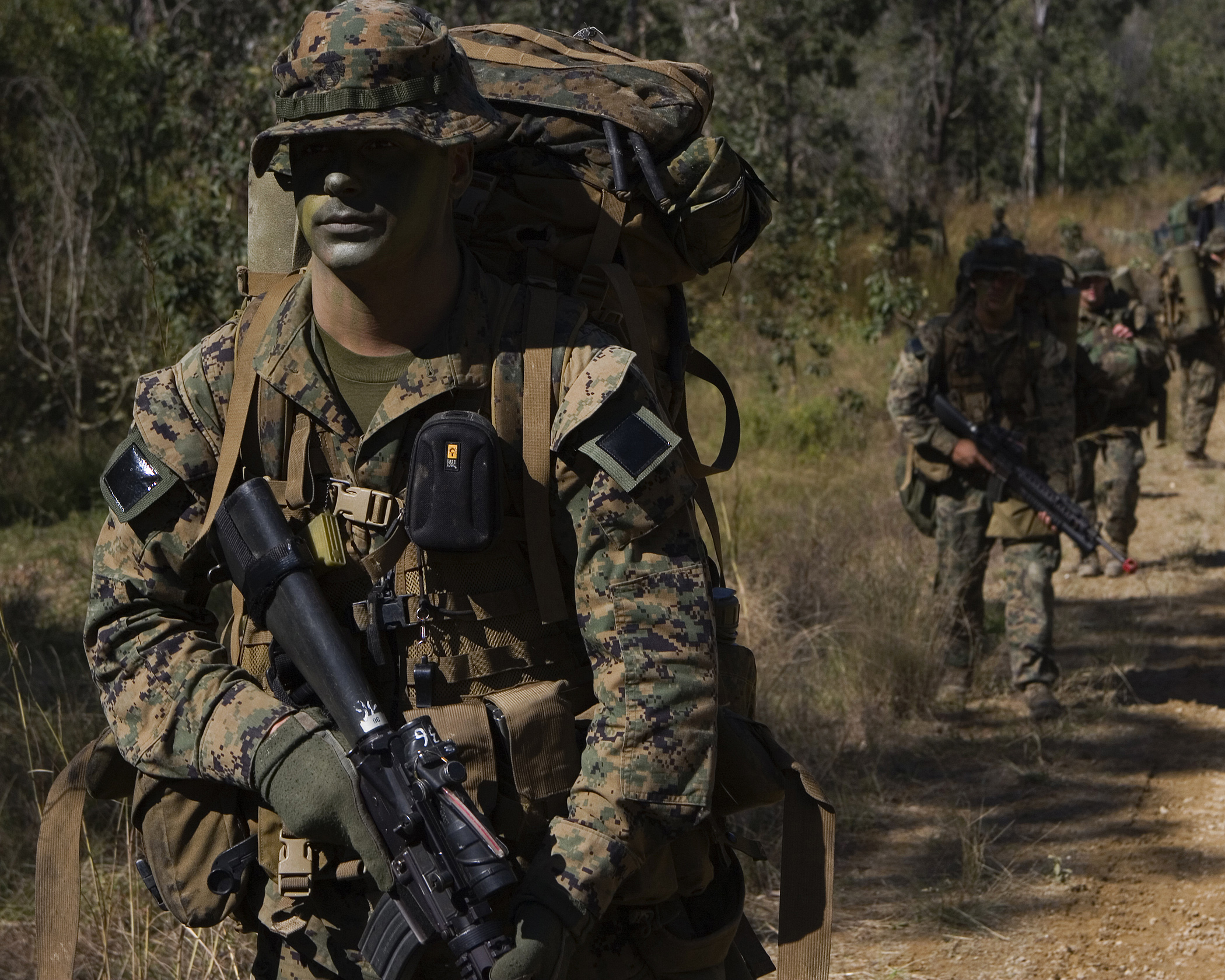
Marine wearing 782 gear

- 03 Hump-A-Lot – Pejorative used by combat support Marines to refer to Infantry Marines.
- 1st Civ Div – 1st Civilian Division. Civilian life, usually applied to Marines facing discharge or retirement. As in "getting assigned to 1st Civ Div." Also occasionally referred to as "1st Couch Company." Also referred to as "Camp Living Room" a play on Camp Lejeune, NC. 1st Civ Div, Camp Living Room, Zenith Remote Operator (new primary MOS).
- 360 – Forming a complete circle (as in on a compass [360°]); to put protection all around.
- 48, 72, 96 – In hours, the standard liberty periods of two, three, four days.
- 4th Battalion – Pejorative for individual or unit lacking toughness as in "He was trained in 4th Battalion". Derived from the 4th Battalion of the Recruit Training Regiment at MCRD Parris Island, which trains female enlisted Marines.
- 4th Marine Dimension – Derogatory term for the 4th Marine Division, the division to which the ground combat element of the Marine Forces Reserve is assigned; used by active duty Marines to denote displeasure with the difference in culture and operating procedures within the division as opposed to active duty units.
- 5.56 hickey – A scar or blister resulting from a burn suffered (usually on the neck) due to hot brass.
- 7 Day Store/Troop Store/Mini P – Convenience store (Mini-P denotes a "mini" or smaller sized version of the PX, or Post-Exchange).
- 782 Gear – Standard issue web gear such as ALICE, MOLLE, or ILBE. So called because the form used for issue of individual gear was NAVMC Form 782. (See Also Deuce Gear below.)
- 8 bells – Signal for the end of a four-hour watch, so named for the increase in bell strike each half-hour of the watch.
- 8th & I – Nickname for Marine Barracks, Washington, D.C. so named from its street address at the corner of 8th and I Streets SE.

== A ==
- Aboard – All personnel being accounted for in a building, such as a classroom.
- Above my/your pay grade – Expression denying responsibility or authority (indicating that the issue should be brought to higher-ranking officials); alternatively, a semi-sarcastic way of telling someone that they're not authorized to receive certain information.
- Acquire(d)/Tactically Acquire(d) – euphemism implying the item(s) in question were obtained either by theft or by otherwise non-traditional or creative methods.

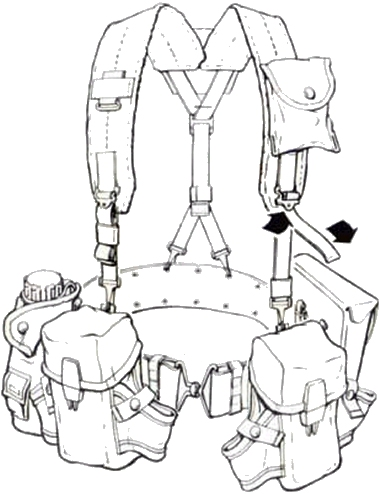
ALICE equipment

- Air Crew – Personnel that work on board any aircraft that can carry a crew (i.e. UH-1, CH-46, CH-53, V-22, etc.), and are normally charged with loading gear, passengers, and manning the door/ tail guns.
- Air Force pockets or Army gloves – An individual's hands being inside their pockets.
- ALICE – All-purpose lightweight individual carrying equipment, a form of combat gear still in occasional use in some Marine activities, replaced by MOLLE and ILBE
- All Hands – entire ship's company or unit personnel, including all officers and enlisted personnel; also, the official Navy magazine
- Alphas or Class As – Service Alpha uniform from the phonetic letter A
- AMTRAC – Portmanteau for amphibious tractor; not to be confused with the railroad company Amtrak. Also referred to as "Tracks."
- ANGLICO – Air Naval Gunfire Liaison Company
- Ant Farm – Area of an encampment where the radio antennae are emplaced.
- AO– Area of Operations during a deployment.
- ARMY – Ain't Ready to be a Marine Yet, Aren't Really Men/Marines Yet, or Air Force Rejected Me Yesterday – backronym pejorative term used for the Army.
- Arty– Short for Artillery.
- ASP – Ammunition Supply Point, where ammo is stored and issued.
- ASVAB waiver – Insinuates someone's inability to pass the Armed Services Vocational Aptitude Battery (ASVAB)
- As You Were – Order to disregard the immediately preceding order
- Asiatic – World War II term for eccentric behavior characteristic of men serving too long in the Far East
- At Ease – Command given to subordinate that he no longer needs to stand at attention. Is also used as slang as a way to tell someone to chill out or calm down.
- Aviation Units – See also active squadrons, decommissioned squadrons, & aviation support units
  - HAMS – Headquarters and Maintenance Squadron, also H&MS
  - HMA – Marine Attack Helicopter Squadron
  - HMH – Marine Heavy Helicopter Squadron
  - HMHT – Marine Heavy Helicopter Training Squadron
  - HML – Marine Light Helicopter Squadrons
  - HMLA – Marine Light Attack Helicopter Squadron
  - HMLAT – Marine Light Attack Helicopter Training Squadron
  - HMM – Marine Medium Helicopter Squadron (formerly HMR)
  - HMMT – Marine Medium Helicopter Training Squadron
  - HMR – Marine Helicopter Transport Squadron
  - HMT – Marine Helicopter Training Squadron (General designation prior to specific communities (i.e. HMHT(CH-53), HMLAT(H-1))
  - HMX-1 – Marine Helicopter Squadron One (divided into operational test & Executive transport support)
  - LAAD Bn – Low-altitude Air Defense Battalion
  - MABS – Marine Air Base Squadron
  - MACG – Marine Air Command Group
  - MACS – Marine Air Control Squadron
  - MAMS – Marine Aircraft Maintenance Squadron
  - MASS – Marine Air Support Squadron
  - MALS – Marine Aviation Logistics Squadron
  - MATCS – Marine Air Traffic Control Squadron
  - MCAS – Marine Corps Air Station
  - MOTS – Marine Operational Training Squadrons
  - MTACS – Marine Tactical Air Command Squadron
  - MWSS – Marine Wing Support Squadron
  - MWCS – Marine Wing Communications Squadron
  - MWHS – Marine Wing Headquarters squadron
  - MWSG – Marine Wing Support Group
  - SOES – Station Operations and Engineer Squadron
  - VMAQ – Marine Tactical Electronic Warfare Squadron
  - VMA – Marine Attack Squadron
  - VMAT – Marine Attack Training Squadron
  - VMB – Marine Bombing Squadron
  - VMC – Marine Composite Squadron
  - VMCJ – Marine Composite Reconnaissance Squadron
  - VMD – Marine Photographic Squadron
  - VMF – Marine Fighter Squadron
  - VMF(N) – Marine Night Fighter Squadron
  - VMFA – Marine Fighter Attack Squadron
  - VMFA(AW) – Marine All-Weather Fighter Attack Squadron
  - VMFAT – Marine Fighter Attack Training Squadron
  - VMFP – Marine Tactical Reconnaissance Squadron
  - VMGR – Marine Aerial Refueler/Transport Squadron
  - VMGRT – Marine Aerial Refueler/Transport Training Squadron
  - VMJ – Marine Reconnaissance Squadron / Marine Target Towing Detachments
  - VML – Marine Glider Squadron
  - VMM – Marine Medium Tiltrotor Squadron (formerly HMM, HMH & VMFA)
  - VMMT – Marine Medium Tiltrotor Training Squadron (formerly HMMT)
  - VMO – Marine Observation Squadron
  - VMP – Marine Patrol Squadron
  - VMR – Marine Transport Squadron
  - VMS – Marine Scouting Squadron
  - VMSB – Marine Scout Bombing Squadron
  - VMTB – Marine Torpedo Bombing Squadron
  - VMTD – Marine Target Towing Detachment
  - VMU – Unmanned Aerial Vehicle Squadron
  - VMX – Marine Tiltrotor Operational Test and Evaluation Squadron
  - WES – Wing Engineer Squadron
  - WTS – Wing Transport Squadron
  - ZMQ – Marine Barrage Balloon Squadrons
- Aye-Aye – Nautical term used as a response to orders meaning "I understand the orders I have received and will carry them out"; aye (descended from Middle English yai) dialectical for 'yes', once common in the regions from which the Royal Navy drew its sailors

== B ==
- Back on the Block – Behaving like a civilian.
- BAH (a.k.a. "bee ay aych" – Basic Allowance for Housing: Supplemental pay for living off-base; previously known as Basic Allowance for Quarters (BAQ).
- Ball ammo – Typically referring to M855 (5.56mm NATO) cartridge, colloquially known as "green-tips"
- Barney-style – to perform strictly according to regulation; idiot proof; simplified for the benefit of mental underachievers; often said as "Breaking it down Barney-style" or "Mr. Potato Head style"; Bert and Ernie for the 1980s and 1990s Marines
- Barracks – On base housing for Marines who have no dependents, any dependents living with them. Military dormitory rooms.
- Barracks Bunny – Female Marines that tend or are rumored to sleep around in the barracks, also referred to as "hopping from room to room".
- Barracks Cover – Fabric-cover frame cap worn green with the service uniform and white with the dress uniform; traditionally officers wear this cap with quatrefoil and gilt devices that increase with rank.
- Barracks Rat – Guy who stays in the barracks instead of going into town.
- BAS – Battalion Aid Station: A unit's medical post for routine ailments and injuries; also Basic Allowance for Subsistence. See also sick bay.
- Battery – Consists of six Artillery pieces, Guns Platoon (cannoneers), & HQ Platoon (support & logistics). Equivalent to an Infantry "Company".
- Battery Operated Grunt – combat radio operator.
- Battle Blaze – original name for the 1st & 2nd Marine Division shoulder sleeve insignias commemorating service in the Battle of Guadalcanal.
- Battle Pin – Tie clasp or tie tack; until the start of World War II a metal bar worn on shirt collar.
- Battle Sight Zero or BZO – calibrated settings on a gunsight that contribute to accuracy; used as default before adjusting windage or elevation; also used as verb when triangulating a BZO.
- BB Counter – Marine whose duties are the handling, storage, issue of ordnance.
- BCD – Bad Conduct Discharge; also known as Big Chicken Dinner.
- BCGs or BCs – Birth Control Goggles or Boot Camp Glasses: military issue glasses worn at recruit training; so called because they make the wearer too ugly to engage in sexual relations. See also portholes & RPGs.

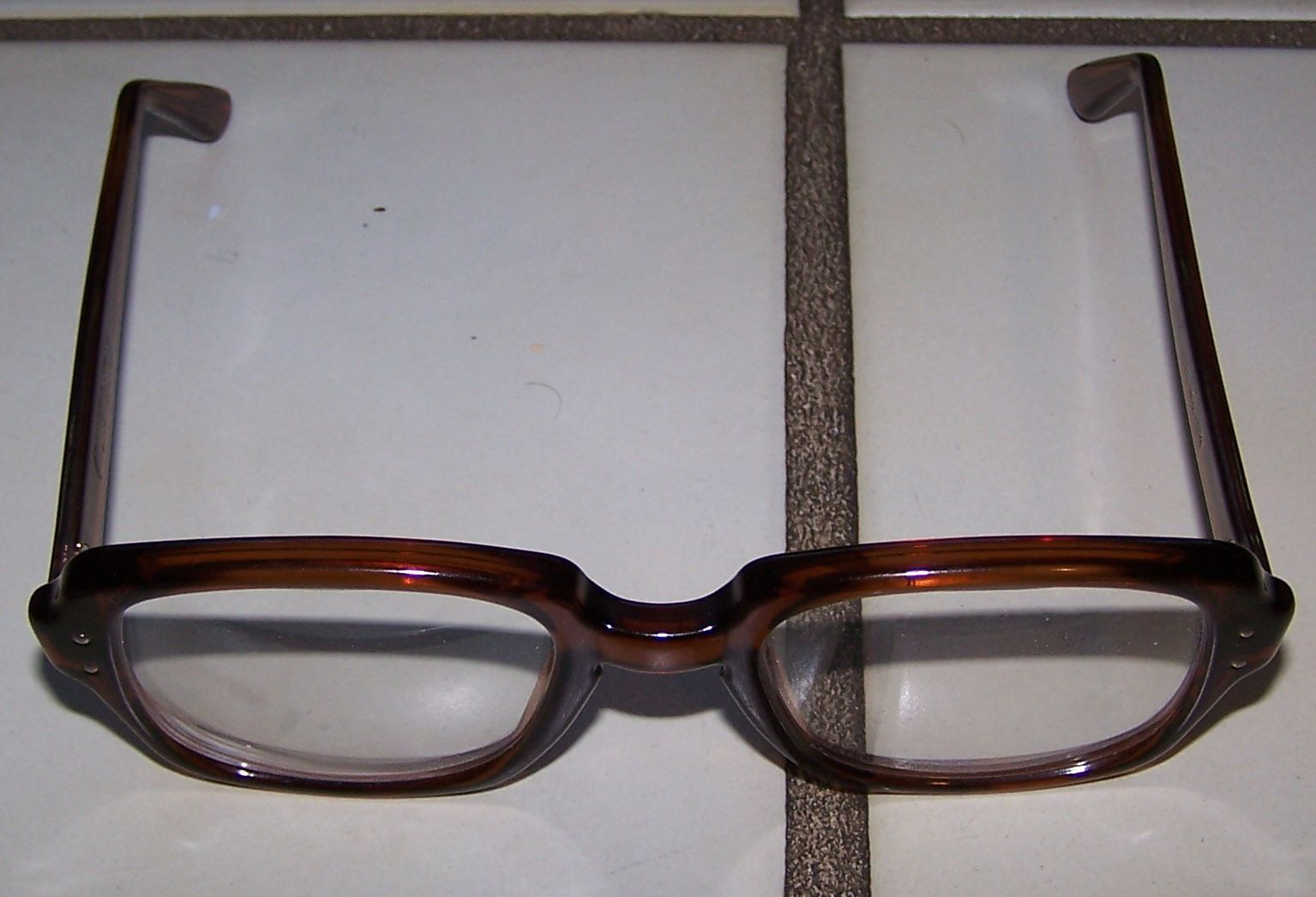
BCGs

- Beer Garden – Social area permitting the consumption of alcohol etc.; may contain barbecue or picnic facilities.
- Belay – To cancel an order; to stop; to firmly secure a line.
- Below Decks – Area below the surface (deck) of a ship.
- Benotz – Generic, unnamed junior Marine. Often gets into trouble, especially when accompanied by his friend Schmuckatelli.
- BEQ – Bachelor Enlisted Quarters: living spaces for single enlisted Marines; usually a barracks.
- Big Green Weenie – euphemism for the Marine Corps when it has cheated or "screwed over a Marine.
- Bird, Ball & Fish Hook – derogatory term for the Eagle, Globe and Anchor of the Marine Corps Emblem.
- Binnacle List – sick list: those excused from duty for health reasons; traditionally posted on or near the binnacle.
- Blanket Party – Group assault: victim's head is covered by a blanket so the perpetrators cannot be identified.
- Blood pinning – Hazing ritual wherein more senior servicemembers will pound a newly earned award (typically airborne wings or rank) into the recipients chest causing bleeding
- Blood stripe – Red band on dress uniform trousers; traditionally said to symbolize blood shed by Marine officers and NCOs during the Battle of Chapultepec; worn by NCOs and officers.
- Blooper / Bloop Gun – Grenade launcher: from the distinctive noise made when one is fired. See also thump gun.
- Blousing Garters – The correct name for "boot bands."
- BLT – Battalion Landing Team: the ground combat element of a MEU; not to be confused with a Bacon, Lettuce, and Tomato sandwich.
- Blues or Dress Blues – Blue Dress uniform.
- Blueberry – A Marine Corps Civilian Law Enforcement Officer. Can be used as both an insult and endearment.
- BLUF – Bottom Line Up Front.
- Bn – battalion.
- boondoggle – project or trip on government time or expense that serves no purpose other than to entertain the person making it.
- Boot – Marines who are new to the Marine Corps. Derived from the term boot camp, and insinuates that the Marine is fresh out of boot camp. Generally used as a pejorative term (even if in an affectionate manner) in the fleet and elsewhere, sometimes as a way to explain that new Marines should know their place. It may be used to describe a marine who is new to a rank or billet; for example, a newly promoted corporal may be referred to as a "boot corporal." Also used by infantry marines as a pejorative for any other marine who has not gone on a combat deployment, regardless of rank or time in service.

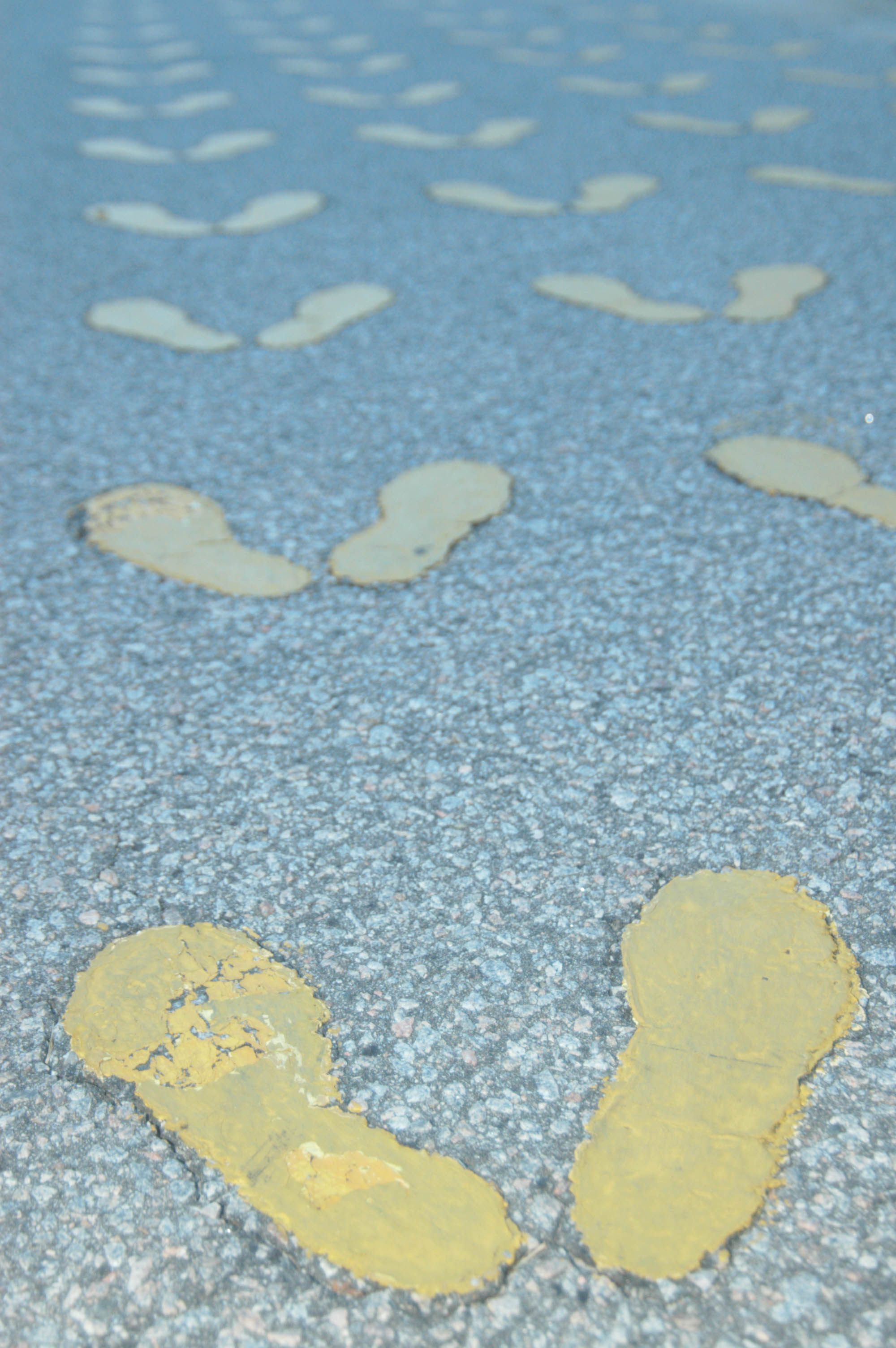
The first thing a recruit sees at boot camp

- Boot Bands – Elastic bands or metal springs rolled into the hem of the trousers to blouse them near the top of the boot.
- Boots and Utes – The utility uniform without the normal uniform blouse, typically used for PT.
- boot camp – Training hub for new Marines at Parris Island, SC and San Diego, CA.
- BOQ – Bachelor Officer Quarters: housing for single Marine officers.
- Bore punch – Getting tested for sexually transmitted infections after weekend liberty or a red-cross notice.
- Box-kicker – Pejorative for a Marine who works in supply (either the MOS 3043 (Supply Administration) or usually a 3051 – (Basic Warehouseman)).
- Brain Bucket – Helmet.
- Brain-housing Group – Pejorative for a Marine's head or skull.
- Brass – 1) Shell casings; 2) Uniform insignia; 3) Senior officers (cf. rank insignia); 4) (BRASS) USMC shooting technique: Breathe, Relax, Aim, Slack, Squeeze.
- Bricks – Term referring to the barracks or junior enlisted living quarters.
- Brig – Military prison on ship or ashore.
- Brig Rat – Marine who has served much brig time; also used to refer to the 5831 MOS Marines who serve as corrections specialists (guards).
- Brightwork – Shiny metal that Marines must polish.
- Broke-dick – Any person who does not perform up to standards, or a sorry piece of equipment.
- Broke – Feeling severe fatigue. Also refers to anything that isn't working.
- Brown-bagger – Marines (usually married) who live off base; instead of eating at mess halls they pack meals to work.
- Buddy-fucker (Blue Falcon) – One who disregards a team-member's welfare; a Marine who will turn on a fellow Marine in order to save himself/herself.
- Bug Juice – Insect repellent.
- Bulkhead – A wall.
- Bum Scoop – Bad information.
- Burning Man – A Marine who is scorched by hot gun casings.
- Bus Driver – Air Force pilot; so called because early USAF uniforms were said to resemble those of municipal streetcar officials.
- Busted – Reduced in rank.
- Butt Pack – Small pack fastened to the waist in the back. Usually the field issued first aid kit. See also Fanny pack.
- Butter Bar – A second lieutenant, due to the gold color of his rank insignia.
- "By your leave sir/ma'am." – Used with a salute prior to passing senior officers who might be advancing in the same direction; protocol states the senior must acknowledge by returning salute with phrase "Carry on" before the junior passes on the left.

== C ==
- CACO – Casualty Assistance Calls/Counseling Officer, a Marine detailed to inform and help the family of a Marine killed, wounded, or captured in the line of duty.
- Cadillacs – boots; method of transportation when no other vehicle is available. Also refers to all leather combat boots.
- Call Out – To challenge, often by announcing incriminating information about a person. See also drop a dime.
- Cammies – camouflage utility uniform.
- Camp Living Room – Duty station after discharge. Civilian life. 1980s usage.
- Campaign Cover – Official term for the green campaign hat worn by drill instructors and designated rifle range personnel. Occasionally referred to as a "Smokey Bear" for obvious reasons. See also field hat, hat, & smokey bear/brown.
- Cannon Cocker – artilleryman. See also gun bunny and red leg.
- Cannon Fodder – Marines regarded merely as material to be expended in war.
- Canoe U. – nickname for United States Naval Academy at Annapolis, Maryland. See also South Maryland Small Boat & Barge Institute.
- CAR – Short for Combat Action Ribbon
- Captain's Mast – Office Hours afloat. The term "Captain's Mast" is almost universally negative, implying non-judicial punishment. The modern Navy and Marine Corps use the term "Meritorious Mast" to announce any ceremony involving the meritorious award of a higher rank or of a particular recognition or honor. USA & USAF refer to this as "Article 15" hearing.
- Carry On – Order to continue after being interrupted. Also music played immediately following playing of "colors" to inform people to resume activities.
- CAS – Close Air Support, aircraft fire on ground troops in support of nearby friendly troops.
- CASEVAC – CASualty EVACuation, emergency evacuation of injured personnel from combat zone by any modes of transport available to nearest triage area, treatment area, or field hospital. As opposed to a MEDEVAC which is the transport from a field hospital to a Medical Treatment Facility. See also MEDEVAC.
- Casual Company – A holding unit/formation of Marines awaiting one of the following: discharge from the Corps, training (usually at a formal school), or deployment to a unit.
- CAX – Combined Arms eXercise. Outdated term, it has since been replaced by the ITX (Integrated Training eXercise).
- CBRN – Chemical, Biological, Radiological, and Nuclear. See also NBC.
- CCU – Correctional Custody Unit, a hard-labor and heavy discipline unit overseen by MPs or Navy Masters-at-Arms to which Marines and Sailors found guilty of minor UCMJ offenses through NJP are sent for up to 30 days in lieu of confinement in the brig.
- Chairborne or Chairborne Ranger – Someone who works in an office environment, a play on airborne.

A single chevron

- Charlies or Chucks – The service "C" uniform, consisting of the short-sleeve khaki shirt and green trousers.
- Charlie Foxtrot – Abbreviation for "Cluster Fuck", a mess
- Chaser – Pejorative for a Marine assigned prisoner escort duties, an escort for a single prisoner or detail of prisoners.
- Check Fire – Order to stop firing due to a safety condition, possible error or mistarget.
- Chest Candy – Used in reference to the ribbons and medals on a Marine's uniform.
- Chevron – Symbols of enlisted ranks above private, usually not acceptably called "stripes" unless referring to the rank insignia itself.
- China Marines – Those United States Marines from the 4th Marine Regiment who were stationed in Shanghai, China during 1927–1941
- Chit – Voucher, receipt, letter, or note, entitling the bearer to special treatment, such as medical restrictions from duty; derived from Hindi word for "letter", "chitti".
- Chow – Food
- Chowhall, also Chow hall – Cafeteria
- CIF – Consolidated Issue Facility, a place on a station where all personal equipment is stored and issued, often contracted to civilians.
- CID – Criminal Investigation Division, is an accredited Federal law enforcement agency of the U.S. Marine Corps whose mission it is to conduct official criminal investigations into misdemeanor and felony offenses committed on Marine Corps installations as may directed and not under the primary jurisdiction of the Naval Criminal Investigative Service (NCIS). These Marines are not formal law enforcement officers per se, and only perform investigations under the cognizance of NCIS.
- Civvies – Civilian clothing or mufti.
- CLP – Cleaner, Lubricant, Preservative, teflon-based cleaning and lubricating fluid used for maintaining small arms. Also slang for coffee. Vulgar: Also refers to "Chow, Liberty, Pussy/Penis" in reference to things a male/female Marine "needs".
- Cluster fuck – Chaotic and messy situation from multiple mistakes or problems happening in rapid succession. See also goat rope / goat rodeo / goat screw.
- CMC – Acronym for Commandant of the Marine Corps.
- COB – Close Of Business, the end of working hours; or Close Order Battle, a synonym for CQB.
- COC – Combat Operations Center, the command post for a combat arms unit, usually of battalion-size or larger; personnel assigned to the COC may derisively refer to such duty as "coc-watch" or "working the coc".
- COG – Corporal Of the Guard, The acting corporal, (or near rank) that acts under the SOG Sgt. of the Guard on watch, radio watch, or post.
- CONUS – CONtinental United States (48 states excluding Alaska and Hawaii), as opposed to OCONUS.
- Corfams – Uniform dress shoes made from poromeric imitation leather.
- Corpsman – Navy hospital corpsman attached to a Marine unit; also known as "doc"; inappropriate to address as "medic" or "aid man". See also boxsee.
- Cover – Headgear (a hat); also any protection from enemy fire.
- Cover and Alignment – When in a formation, this refers to the proper distance between those next to, in front of, and behind a person; to seek the proper interval.
- CQB or CQC – Close Quarters Battle/Combat, combat within a confined space, such as urban warfare. See also MOUT.
- Crew-Served – Short for crew-served weapon; can also be used as an adjective for something large and very powerful, based on a crew-served weapon being such.
- Cruise – Deployment aboard ship; or enlistment period, inappropriately called a stint.
- CS – 2-chlorobenzalmalononitrile (Tear Gas), a white solid powder commonly used for CBRN defense training.
- Cumshaw – Something extra or free, given as a favor or gift; pidgin expression using the Chinese word for "grateful thanks", "kamsia".

== D ==
- D & D – Drunk and Disorderly, an entry formerly made on the liberty list beside the name of any Marine returning from liberty in that condition.
- Daijoubu – OK, from Japanese for "don't worry".
- Daily 7 or Daily 16 – stretches and exercises used as a warmup for other, more strenuous physical training.
- Dark Green/Light Green – Common reference to a Marine's skin color. A common saying in the Corps is that Marines are not black or white, only different shades of green.
- DASCateer – term used to describe a Marine that works in the Direct Air Support Center.
- Dead Horse – To draw advance pay out of the normal pay cycle, the Marine is then obligated to repay the debt at the government's convenience.
- deck – Floor or surface of the earth; to punch or knock down with one blow.
- Deep Six – To dispose of by throwing overboard ship.
- Department of Transportation – Pejorative for The US Navy
- Detachment or Det – A portion of a unit sent independently of its parent organization, usually in support of a larger headquarters; or a small stand alone unit isolated geographically from its parent command.
- Deuce – Reference to the number two in various unit or equipment names; the senior intelligence officer for a unit;
- Deuce Gear – See 782 gear, from the last digit in that term.
- Devil Dog or Devil or Dog – Nickname for Marines, from the German word "Teufelhunden", supposedly given by German troops at the Battle of Belleau Wood, though the correct grammatical form would be "Teufelshunde".

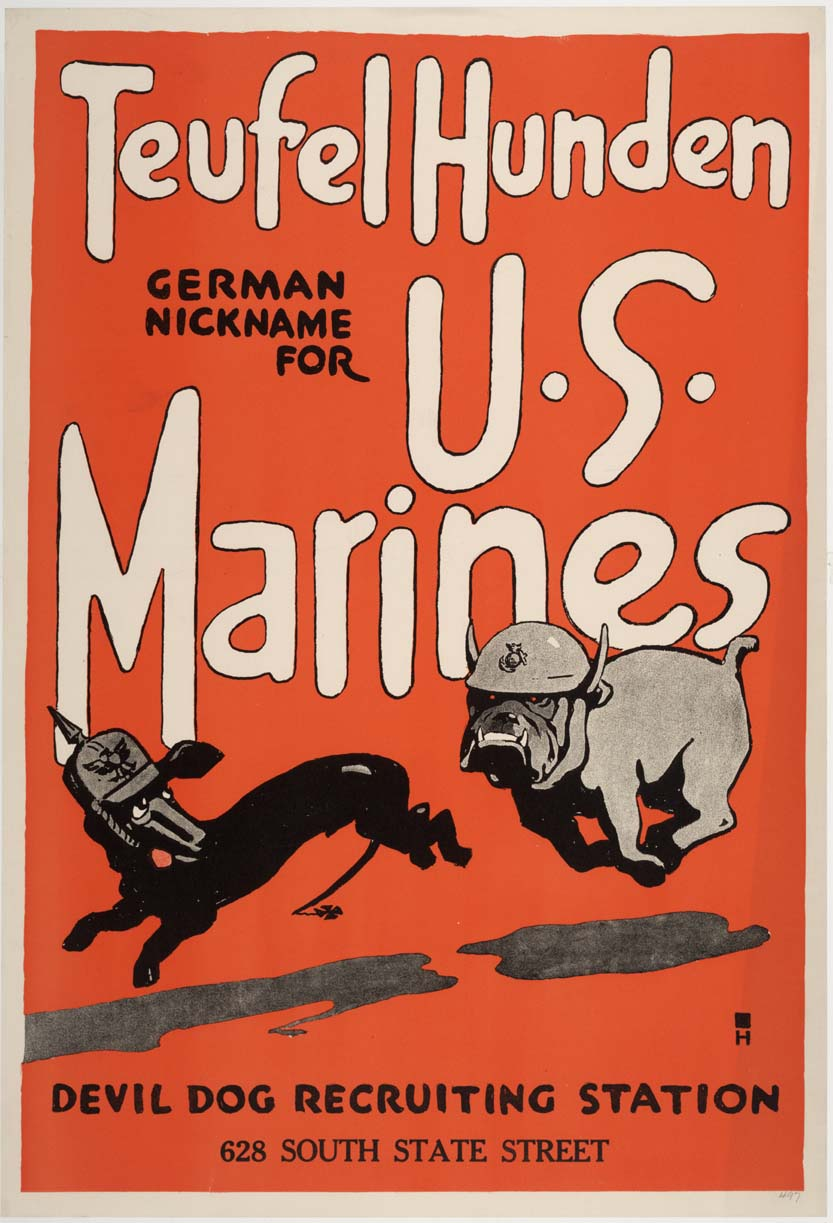
Devil Dog

- Devil Duck – Another name for a Navy hospital corpsman. It conveys respect, but contains a hint of interservice rivalry.
- Devil Nuts – A regional variation of devil dog and nickname for Marines. Popular with Marines serving at Marine Barracks Japan (Late 1990s era).
- Devil Pup – Nickname for a Marine's child(ren); a member of the Young Marines; a patronizing nickname for a junior Marine. Mostly used by senior Marines to reference junior Marines in a polite way, and commonly used around higher ups.
- DGAF – Doesn't/Don't Give A Fuck. Generally coincides with one who is OFP.
- DI – Drill Instructor, inappropriate to use the Army term "drill sergeant".
- DI Hut – Office for drill instructors in a platoon's squad bay; doubles as sleeping quarters for the drill instructor on duty. See also house mouse.
- Dickskinner or Dickbeater – Human hands particularly those of personnel indulging in compulsive masturbation.

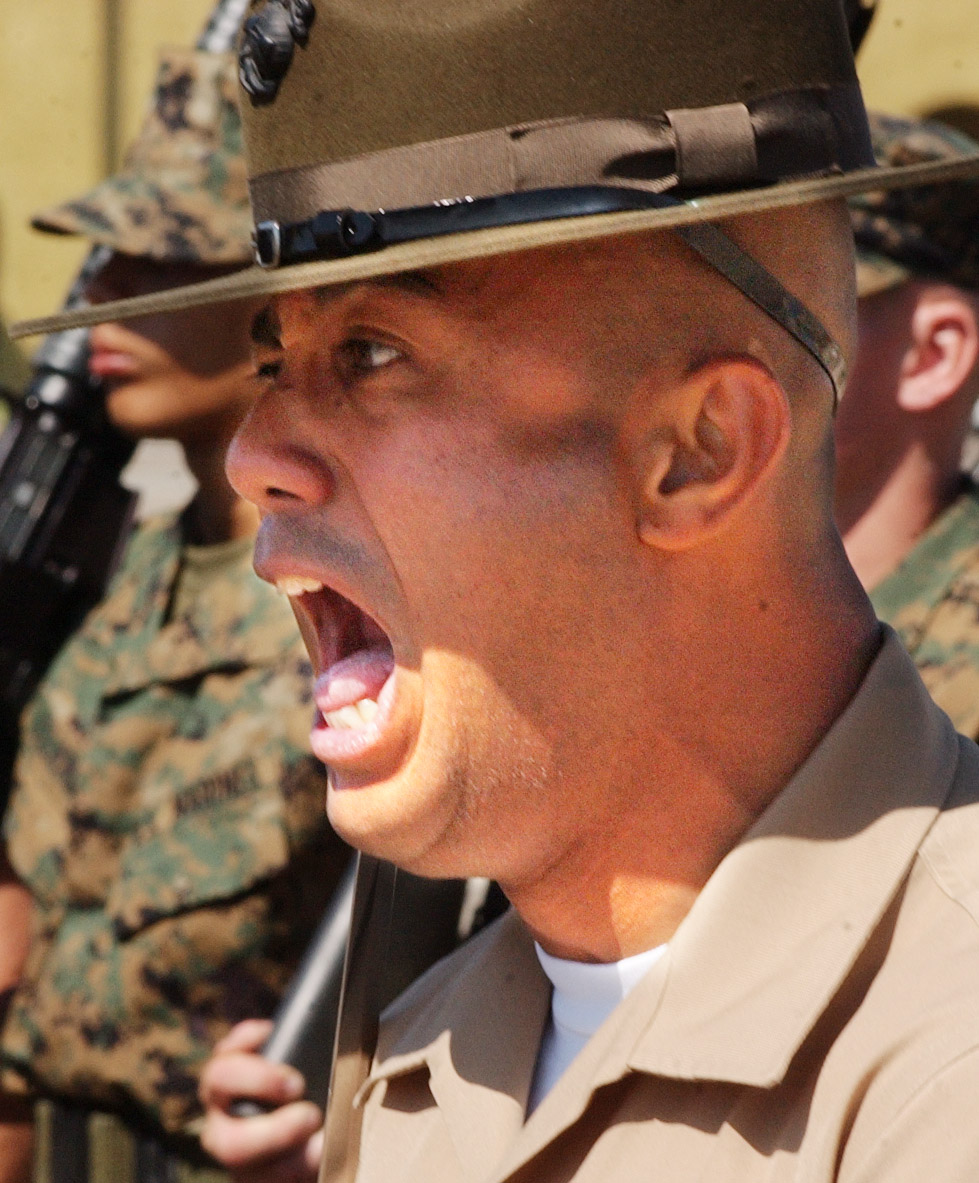
DI

- Diddy Bop – Poor performance in close order drill, or marching in a manner that does not present a crisp military appearance. One who conducts himself/herself in this manner is labelled a diddy bopper.
- Diet Recruit or Diet Tray – A recruit in Boot Camp who has been deemed overweight according to regulations. These recruits are usually the last through the chow line, receive lower calorie foods, and have their meals inspected by DI's.
- Digis or Diggis or Diggies – Digital camouflage such as MARPAT; also refers to the digital-patterned MCCUU.
- Dime Out – To reveal incriminating information about a person. See also call out.
- Disneyland East – Headquarters Marine Corps at Arlington, Virginia.
- Doc or Devil Doc – Navy hospital corpsman attached to the Marines; Devil Doc is a term of respect normally reserved for Corpsmen who are Fleet Marine Force qualified or who have served in combat with Marines.
- Dog and Pony Show – Any display, demonstration, or appearance by Marines at the request of seniors for the pleasure of someone else, such as a ceremony or parade; also, pejorative for the requirement for over-perfection of such a venue.
- Doggie – Enlisted member of the United States Army, from the World War I era slang "dog-face" for an infantryman.
- Donkey Dick – Specifically, a jerrycan fuel spout. Alternatively, slang for virtually any piece of equipment having a generally cylindrical or phallic shape with unknown, or obscure official name. For example, a static hook suspended from an overhead helicopter for the purpose of picking up external loads.
- Donut Brigade – Pejorative nickname for the Physical Conditioning Platoon, a unit to which recruits are sent if they fail to meet strength/fitness requirements.
- Dope – Data On Previous Engagements, information, or sight settings or wind corrections for a rifle under given conditions.
- Double Rat – A recruit in boot camp who has been deemed underweight according to regulations. These recruits are given twice the normal amount of food at mealtimes until they reach an acceptable weight.
- DPICM – Dual-Purpose Improved Conventional Munitions, a specialized artillery round that releases sub-munitions.
- Drill – Close order drill, the procedures and methodology of handling weapons and moving troops about in an orderly fashion, used to indoctrinate recruits in obedience to commands and military appearance.
- Drill Hat – A Drill Instructor, usually the second most senior behind the SDI and who specializes in the instruction of close order drill.
- DRMOed – To dispose of an item by taking it to the Defense Reutilization and Marketing Office (DRMO).
- Drug Deal – To obtain needed supplies, equipment or services outside official channels via barter rather than theft.
- Dry fire – Practice firing of a weapon without using ammunition in order to refine body position and other shooting fundamentals.
- DTG – Date-Time Group, a numeric code denoting the time and date of a message.
- Dual-cool or Double-trouble – A Marine that possesses both the parachutist and diver badges, usually associated with the Reconnaissance community.
- Dummy Cord – Lanyard or tether used to secure a piece of equipment to an anchor to prevent losing it.
- Duty NCO or Duty – Sentry responsible for patrol and security of a specific area (usually a barracks or working space in garrison). See also fire watch and OOD

== E ==
EGA

- EAS – End of Active Service, the date of discharge from active duty.
- EGA – Eagle, Globe, and Anchor, the emblem of the Marine Corps. The usage of the term discouraged by older Marines.
- Eight Ball – A Marine who lacks an aggressive spirit.
- Eighth & I or Eighth & Eye – Marine Barracks, Washington, D.C., located at 8th and I Streets SE. See also 8th & I.
- Einstein – A sarcastic term for a Marine who is found to be responsible for a particularly notable unwise action or plan.
- EM – Enlisted Marine/Man, very inappropriate to use today.
- ENJO – Nickname given to Combat Engineers serving within the Infantry.
- Elephant Hat – Pith helmet first issued in 1940 and worn by rifle range coaches today.
- Embed – To place within, or fix in place.
- National Ensign – A.k.a. colors, national flag.
- EOD – Explosive Ordnance Disposal, responsible for the safe handling, deactivation, and removal of unexploded ordnance, the military version of a bomb squad.
- EPD – Extra Punitive Duties, punishment assigned where the individual is required to perform cleaning duties after working hours (on their liberty time).
- EPW – Enemy Prisoner of War.
- Eyeballs – Command given by drill instructors to recruits, ordering them to immediately pay attention or, more specifically, to look directly at the Drill Instructor while he/she is speaking or demonstrating a task.

== F ==
- Fallen Angel – Marine Officer who failed out of flight school and is now in another MOS. When a helicopter is shot down.
- FAP – Fleet Assistance Program, a program designed to assign Marines to extra duties outside their normal chain of command. Sometimes seen as a means for commands to "reassign" their lowest-performing or misbehaving Marines, but can also be used to relieve staffing imbalances between units. Marines who have performed well may occasionally be put into FAP and given lighter-than-normal duties as a reward.

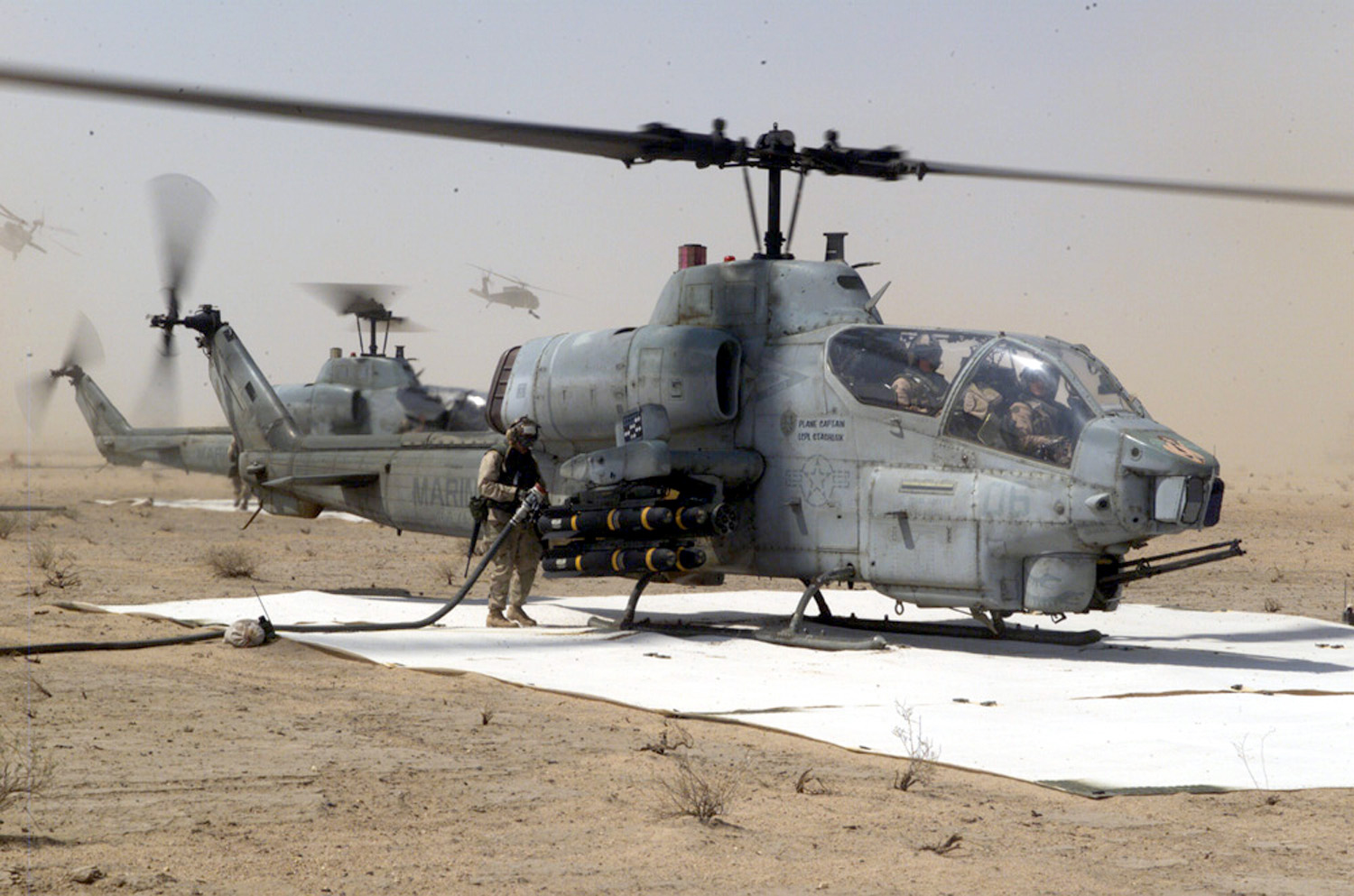
AH-1W Cobras at a FARP during Op Iraqi Freedom

- FARP – Forward arming and refueling point or forward area refueling/rearming point, a space on the battlefield designated for the re-arming and re-fueling of aircraft.
- Fart Sack – Cotton mattress cover; large sack made of linen that a mattress is inserted into. Serves as a military form of a fitted sheet.
- FAST – Fleet Anti-terrorism Security Team, sarcastically referred to as Fake Ass SEAL Team.
- Fast-mover – Fast-moving fixed-wing aircraft; term popular during the Vietnam War but fallen into disuse as jets replaced propeller-powered aircraft. Also refers to a Marine moving fast (promoted) up the ranks.
- Fat Barrel – Round in the chamber, no magazine inserted.
- Fat-body – Overweight recruit or servicemember.
- FEBA – Forward Edge of the Battle Area, the line of departure where a unit enters enemy territory.
- Felony Creek – Slang for the French Creek area of Camp Lejeune. French Creek is the home for the Marine units that are service and support. Some Marines who reside there think they are back on the block.
- Fiddler's Green – An imaginary afterlife or paradise, where only Army cavalrymen killed in action can stay.
- Field 10 – A physically unattractive female servicemember who becomes an object of desire for male servicemembers after extended time in a field or combat environment away from civilian women. A perfect "10" in the field.
- Field Day – Day or portion of day set aside for top-to-bottom cleaning of an area; also as a verb for the act of conducting a field day.
- Field Expedient – Improvisation, to make do with what's available.

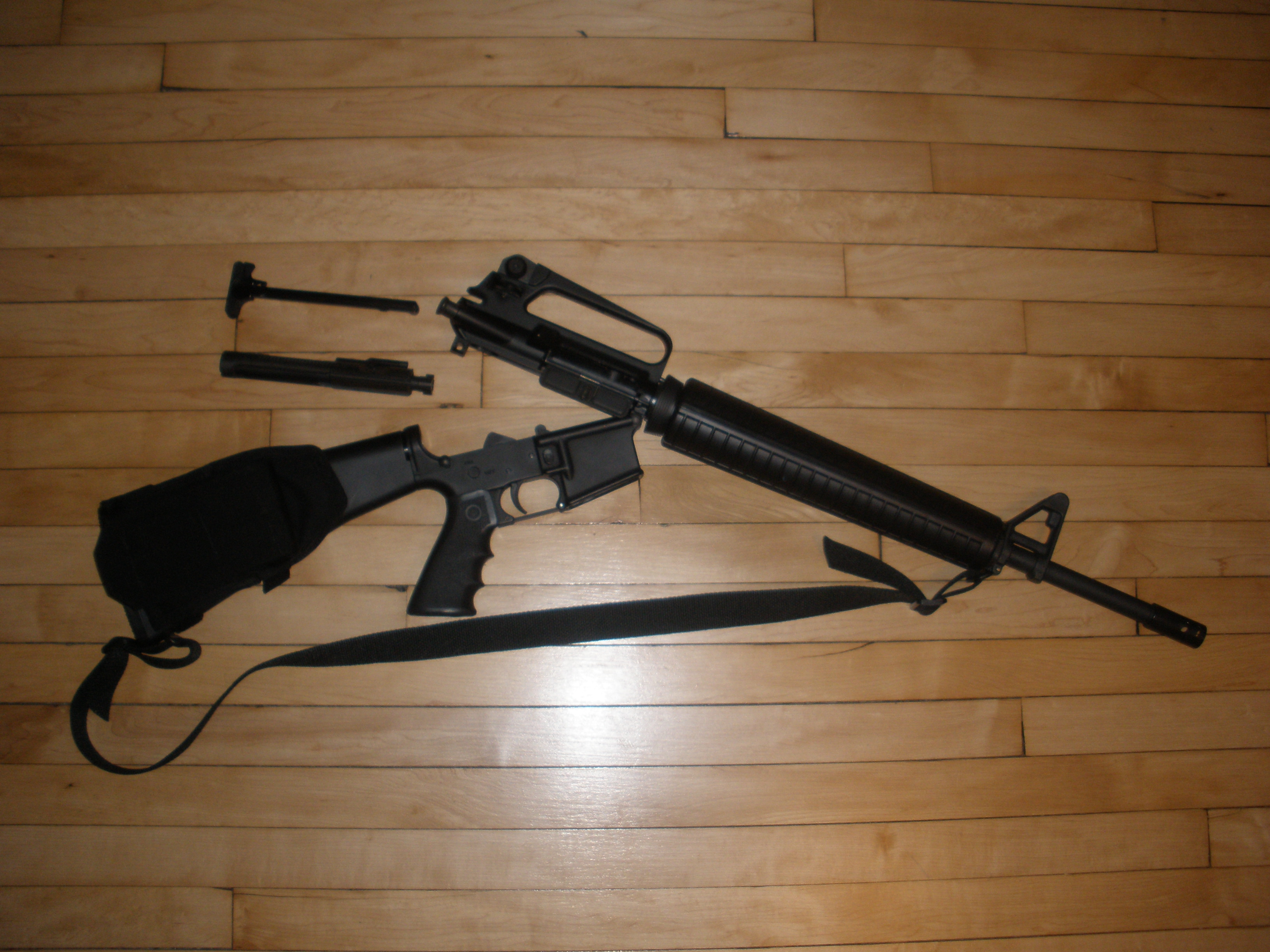
field stripped M16

- Field Cover – Campaign Cover, a broad-brimmed felt hat, originally with one straight crease down the middle, then with a Montana peak, worn on expeditionary missions from 1912 to 1942, and then again authorized in 1961 for wear at recruit depots by drill instructors and rifle ranges by marksmanship instructors. See also campaign cover, hat, & smokey bear/brown.
- Field Meet – Organized sporting competition, often involving athletics or soldierly skills.
- Field Music – Drummer, trumpeter, bugler, fifer; mostly an antiquated term.
- Field-Strip – To disassemble a piece of ordnance or weapon to the major part groups for routine cleaning or lubricating; to strip cigarette butts to their filters before throwing away. Also to remove unwanted items from an MRE in order to save space.
- Fifty-cal – M2 Browning machine gun, from its .50 caliber ammunition. See also Ma Deuce.

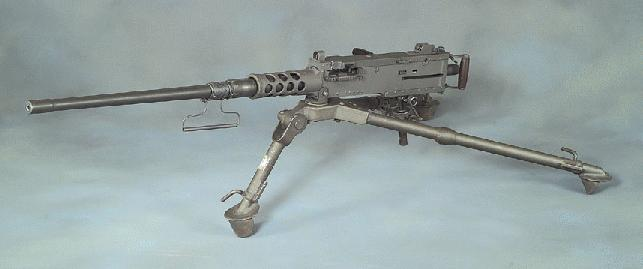
fifty-cal

- Fighting Hole – A defensive position dug into the ground; can be dug for one Marine, a pair, or a weapon crew; formerly known as a "foxhole" by the Army. Marine Corps is "firing hole" "Forward Firing Position" should be considered.
- Final Duty Station – A reference to a Marine's final posting, i.e., Heaven, referencing the last verse of the Marine's Hymn.
- Final Protective Fire or FPF – The last volley sent toward an advancing enemy during a Marine unit's withdrawal from defensive position. All weapons are fired simultaneously at maximum rate of fire.
- Fire for Effect – Indicates that the adjustment/ranging of indirect fire is satisfactory and the actual effecting rounds should be fired; also a euphemism for the execution of a plan.
- Fire Watch – Sentry on duty specifically guarding a person, place, object, or area in a non-combat area (such as a barracks); considered under arms but usually unarmed. See also duty & OOD.
- Fire Watch Medal – Pejorative for National Defense Service Medal, so named because even recruits rate it despite fire watch being their most important duty.
- First Lieutenant, Second Award – Derogatory term for a former first lieutenant who has been frocked (promoted ahead of schedule) to captain.
- First Shirt – company or battery First sergeant.
- Fitness Report or FITREP – Evaluation report written on Marines (sergeant and above) detailing proficiency and conduct and fitness for command, reviewed for promotion.
- Five-jump Chump – A servicemember who has only performed the minimum five paratrooper jumps to receive the Basic Parachute Insignia, as opposed to the Navy and Marine Corps Parachutist Insignia, which requires additional jumps.
- Flak Jacket – Antiquated term for ballistic vest or body armor.
- Flak and Kevlar – Used when referring to body armor and a helmet respectively (the standard US Military issued helmet is made out of kevlar).
- Flipside - The more positive perspective aspect of a given situation.
- Float – Deployment aboard ship.
- Float Widow – Unfaithful wife of a Marine or Sailor who cheats on their spouse while the latter is deployed aboard a ship. a.k.a. Med Float Widow.
- FMC – Fully Mission Capable, refers to equipment such as aircraft that need no repairs and are fully capable of their intended mission.
- FMF or Fleet – Fleet Marine Force, the operational forces of the Corps, as opposed to reserve or supporting establishment.
- FMTU – Foreign Military Training Unit.
- FNG – Fucking New Guy, derogatory term for a Marine recently graduated recruit training and new to a unit. It has far and wide been replaced by the term "boot".
- Fobbie or Fobbit – A Marine who rarely sees combat; pejorative term for Marines stuck inside a forward operating base.
- Follow it – Said when a rifle is dropped by a Marine, the Marine is expected to follow it to the ground by doing a push up as punishment for allowing their rifle to hit the deck. Also used when a Marine drops anything.
- Form ID-10T or ID-Ten-Tango – Code for calling someone an "idiot" to their face without them realizing it, assuming they haven't heard the phrase before.
- Fortitudine – Former motto of the Marine Corps in the 19th century (replaced by Semper Fidelis), from the Latin word for "fortitude"; also the name of the Marine Corps History Division's quarterly magazine.
- Four Fingers of Death – Nickname for the ill famed frankfurter MRE (Meals-Ready-to-Eat) with four small hot dogs as the main meal MRE
- Foxhole – Fighting hole as termed by the Army and Marines of the past, no longer appropriate for Marine use. "Fighting hole," "firing hole," and "Forward Firing Position" should be considered. There is a difference between 1 MARDIV and 2 MARDIV.
- FRAGO – FRAGmentary Order, an addendum to published operational orders.
- FRO – Family Readiness Officer
- Frock – To be authorized to wear the next higher grade before promotion, confers authority but not pay grade.
- Frock You – Response to an inappropriate request to be promoted to a Marine's selected rank, ahead of their scheduled promotion.
- FUBAR – Fucked/Fouled Up Beyond All Recognition/Repair.
- FUBIJAR – Fuck yoU Buddy, I'm Just A Reservist.
- Full-Bird – Colonel, as opposed to a half-bird, light-colonel, or short-bird / short colonel, lieutenant colonel; so named because their rank insignia is a silver eagle.

== G ==
- G-2 – An individual's intellect, from designation for a staff intelligence organization.
- Gaff Off – To disregard or ignore a person or order, context usually denotes insubordination.
- Gagglefuck – Group of Marines grouped too closely or in an unorganized fashion; from gaggle, a flock of grounded geese, and clusterfuck.
- Gangway – Ship's passageway; also used to order juniors to give way to seniors in passageways, and particularly when going up and down ladders.
- Ganked – To take away at last minute or steal. i.e.: "They ganked my leave"
- Garrison – In addition to the traditional meaning, an adjective referring to not being deployed or deployable, such as buildings at a unit's home base.
- Garrison Cover – Soft green folded cap worn with the service uniform. See also fore-and-aft cap and piss cover/cutter.
- Gate Fishing – An off-duty Marine who chats up a girl who may or may not be loitering outside the main gate of Yokosuka, Naval Base (Late 1990s era).
- Gear – Property or equipment; usually referring to an individual's combat equipment.
- Gear Adrift – Gear found left lying around or unguarded, from the saying "gear adrift, must be a gift!".
- Gedunk – Candy and other sweets, or a location where such items are obtained (such as a store or vending machine); borrowed from the comic strip Harold Teen. See also pogey bait.
- General – One method of addressing a brigadier general, major general, lieutenant general, or general. The other would be either "Sir" or Ma'am."
- General Orders – List of 11 General Orders for Sentries detailing rules for guard or sentry duty.
- Get Some – Spirited cry expressing approval and the desire for more or to continue, traditionally associated in the Vietnam War with being in combat or having sex.
- GI Shower – Bathing with limited water (often with the use of wet wipes); forcibly bathing an individual who refuses to meet minimum hygiene standards.
- GITMO – U.S. Naval Base, Guantanamo Bay, Cuba.
- Glow Belt – A reflective belt used when running on or near hard-surfaced roads that makes pedestrians more visible to motorists.
- Go-fasters – Running shoes or sneakers, named so because they help a person run faster than boots.
- Goat Rope – A chaotic and messy situation. See also cluster fuck.
- Going High and to the Right – losing one's temper or rationality; from the common error of a poor shooter to jerk the trigger and impact the upper right side of a target.
- Goldbricking - Goofing off or otherwise not doing one's fair share of work.
- Gomer or GOMER – Antiquated slang for a stupid person, from the character Gomer Pyle; or as a backronym for "Get Out of My Emergency Room" used by corpsmen to refer to malingerers who faked illness to avoid duties.
- Going Internal – During great hardship, to shut oneself off from the world in contemplation of said hardship; Negative Internalization.
- Good Cookie – Good Conduct Medal.
- Good to Go – Expression denoting that difficulties will be overcome; ready; well done or satisfactory.
- Gook – Anything foreign or strange. In modern US usage, "gook" refers particularly to Communist soldiers during the Vietnam War. It is generally considered to be highly offensive and viewed as a racial slur.
- Gore-Tex – All Purpose Environmental Clothing System (APECS), a cold/wet weather protective parka and trousers, based on the Extended Cold Weather Clothing System, usually in reference to the parka; from the fabric it is made from.
- Gouge – Information or news. See also word.
- Grab-Ass – Horseplay, usually wrestling.
- Grand Old Man of the Marine Corps – Usually refers to Brevet Brigadier General Archibald Henderson.
- Grape – A Marine's head, as in: "Keep on grab-assing and you're going to fall and bust your grape!"
- Green Machine – 1980s–1990s, deployable hardened portable computer, sometimes accompanied by encrypted punch tape reader/writer: "Get that Green Machine off the truck and setup ASAP." Also used to refer to the Marine Corps as a whole.
- Green Weenie – When a service member has the full power of the institution inject itself (normally through the anus without consent) which often results in dire consequences for the service member.
- Greens – service uniforms in reference to their color.

Gunny

- Grid Squares – Marked reference lines on a map; often used as a prank fool's errand where an unsuspecting Marine is asked to find a box of them when they do not physically exist.
- Grinder – parade ground or deck used primarily for drill or formations.
- Ground Guide – A person who walks in front of a vehicle in order to detect and avoid obstacles and guide the driver to the proper spot.
- Grunt or Ground Pounder – Infantryman, formerly a pejorative that has taken more neutral tones.
- Grungy - Dirty. Sometimes worn as a badge of honor when back from being in the field.
- GT Score – Intelligence, from the General Technical score on the Armed Services Vocational Aptitude Battery and the minimum scores that many Military Occupational Specialties require to qualify.
- Guide – Unit guidon-bearer; in recruit training, also the senior recruit and responsible for the actions of all recruits in a platoon.
- Gumby Suit – Two pieced wet weather gear consisting of a hooded jacket and overalls used until the mid-1990s when the Gore-Tex replaced it. So named because it is green in color and the wearers tended to look like the character Gumby. Those who have worn them can remember its distinctive rubber cloth odor. Gumby Suits can still be found for purchase at military surplus stores.
- Gun Bunny – Artilleryman. See also cannon cocker and red leg. Also refers to a Marine unit's armorers, as they spend long hours inside the armory conducting maintenance on weapons.
- Gun Club – slang term for the USMC at-large as in "I've been in this gun club longer than you." Use in presence of senior personnel is inappropriate. Use by civilians or members of other services is considered disrespectful.
- Gundecking – to fake or falsify especially by writing up (as a series of official reports) as if meeting requirements but actually without having carried out the required procedures.
- Gun Doc – Nickname for a 2111 SART or 2131 TAST
- Gung ho – Chinese phrase meaning to "work together," it became the battle cry of the Marine Raiders.
- Gunner – shortened form of Marine Gunner, a nickname for an Infantry Weapons Officer; used informally to refer to all warrant officer ranks. A Gunner within Field Artillery is responsible for traversing the cannon tube during emplacement & fire missions. & is 1 of 2 jobs on a gun which requires qualification.
- Gunny – Nickname for gunnery sergeant, improper to call a master gunnery sergeant this.
- Gyrene – Nickname for a Marine; combination of the words "GI" and "Marine".

== H ==
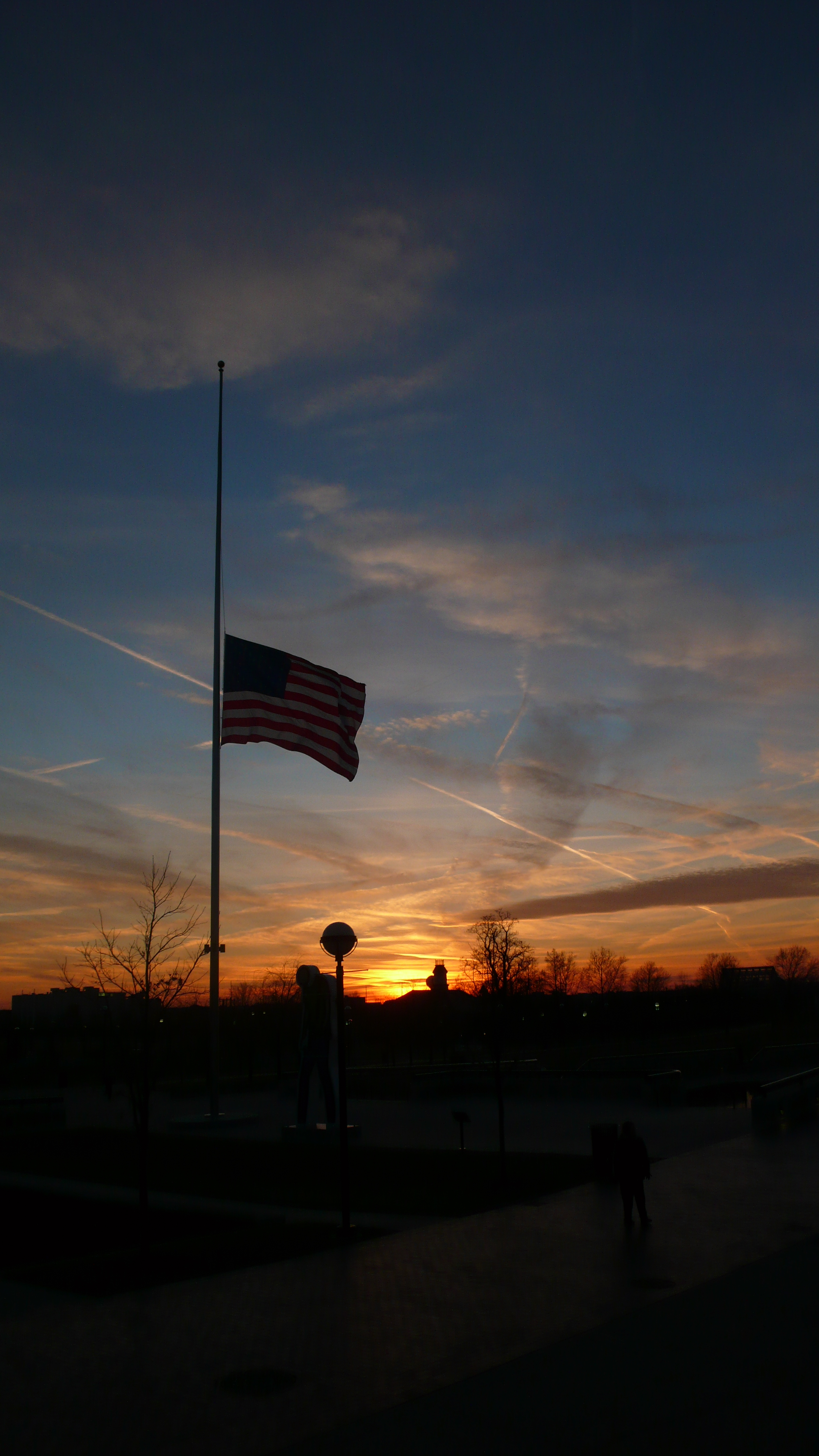
half-mast

- H&S – Headquarters & Service/Supply Company, much like a Headquarters Battalion.
- hack – arrest.
- Haji (hah-jee) – Arab or Middle Eastern person or object, from the Arabic term for one who has completed a pilgrimage to Mecca, or "hajj"
- Half-bird – Lieutenant Colonel, as opposed to a full-bird. See also short colonel.
- Half-Mast – position of the ensign when hoisted to one flag/ensign height below the top, usually done in respect to a deceased person; also called "half-staff" among non-naval forces. Aircraft personnel and aircrew may also refer to the wearing of flight suits and coveralls rolled down to the waist as Half-Mast.
- Hardball – Paved roads (i.e. ground lines of communication).
- Hard Charger or Hard – term of endearment from a senior to a junior Marine when he or she completes a difficult task, so named for charging through the assignment; or general toughness.
- Hashmark – service stripe worn on the uniform sleeve by enlisted men and women for completion of four years of honorable service in any of the U.S. Armed Services and Reserves.
- Hatch – Door; more specifically, the watertight cover over an opening between compartments or that leads to the ladder wells between decks of a ship.
- HBT – HerringBone Twill; the cotton material of Marine utilities from 1941 to the late 1950s.
- HDR – Humanitarian Daily Ration, a variation of the MRE used to feed a single malnourished person for one day with 2,300 calories.
- HE – High Explosive, refers to various kinds of ordnance or Heavy Equipment.

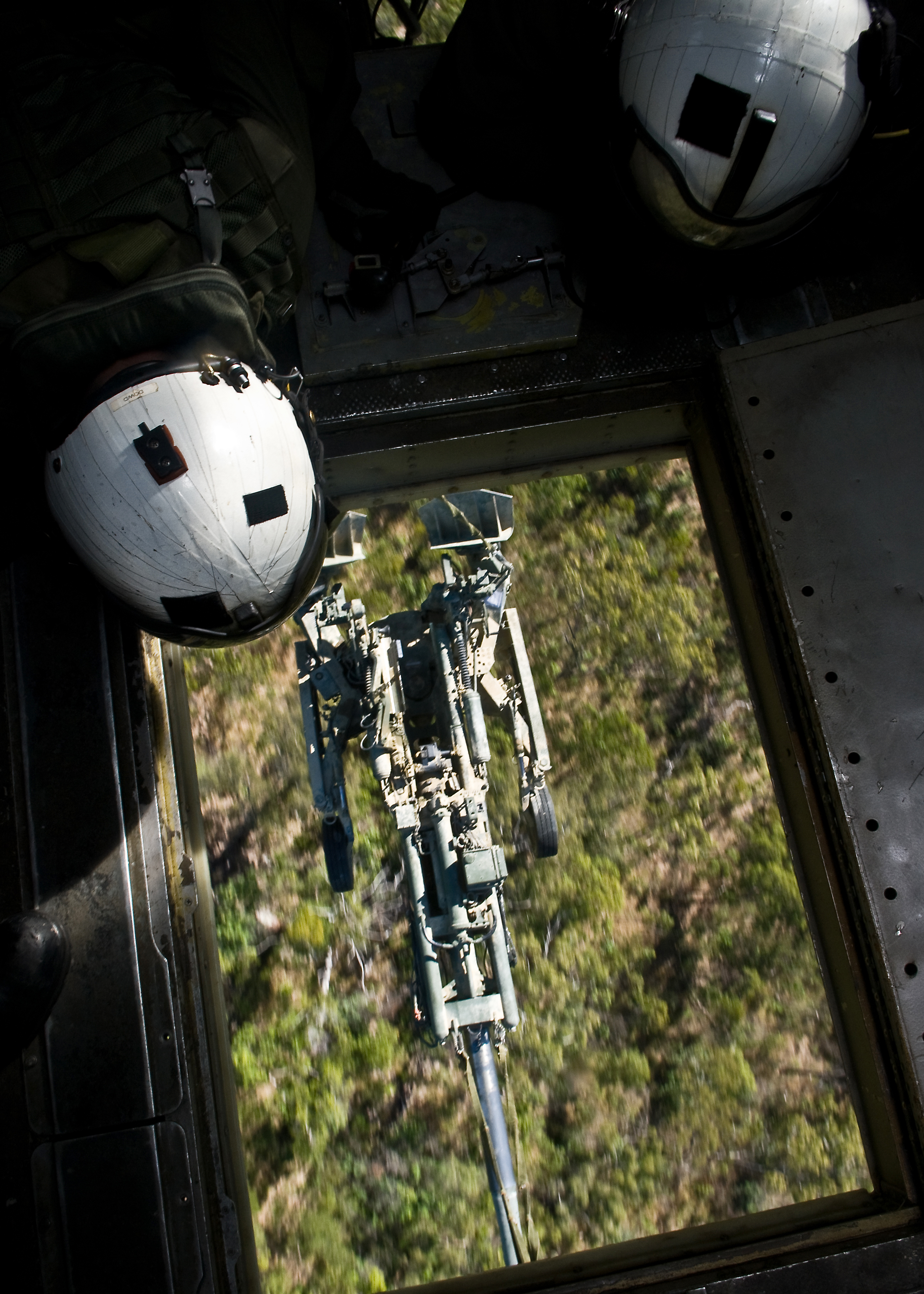
Top-down view through the "hell-hole"

- head – bathroom or latrine, a nautical term from the days of sailing ships when the designated place to defecate and urinate was forward, at the bow or "head" of the ship.
- Head Shed – Command post or other headquarters area where senior Marines gather.
- Headgear – Hats, helmets, caps, etc.
- HEAT – High-Explosive Anti-Tank, type of tank round.
- Heavy Hat – Second-most senior drill instructor in a platoon. Also known as "Drill Hat" and "J Hat."
- Hell Hole – Hatch mounted in the deck of many helicopters (such as the CH-53E Super Stallion) for rappeling and cargo lifting.
- Helo – Helicopter. "Chopper" is an Army term.
- HEDP – High-Explosive Dual Purpose, type of armor-piercing ammunition.
- Hershey Bars – Black leather dress shoes that required regular polishing. Thrown out by most Marines after boot camp and replaced with corfams.
- Hidin' and Slidin' – pejorative backronym for H&S (Headquarters and Service) companies. Also "Hotdogs and Soda."
- High and Tight – Nickname for a common variant of the buzz cut, where the hair is clipped very close. Although having become heavily associated with Marines (giving rise to the term "jarhead"), it is generally not the most common or preferred haircut worn among most Fleet Marines. Also referred to as a "High reg(ular)."
- "Higher-ups" – Nickname for Marines above the rank of E-5 Sergeant.
- High-speed – New, interesting, or cool; often used to sarcastically denote that the subject looks good, but performance is dubious.
- Hillbilly Armor – improvised vehicle armor.
- HIMARS – High Mobility Artillery Rocket System.
- Hippity-hop, mob stop! – Used in place of "Platoon, halt!" by a drill instructor displeased with a platoon's drill performance.
- HITE! – Japanese for yes. A Response in the affirmative used by Marines who have served in Okinawa and mainland Japan.
- HMMWV or Humvee – High-Mobility Multi-purpose Wheeled Vehicle, common utility vehicle.
- Hollywood Marine – Marine who has graduated from Marine Corps Recruit Depot San Diego, stemming from rivalry between the two recruit depots (the other being Marine Corps Recruit Depot Parris Island).
- Homeslice – Person, often a sarcastic overture to civilians from a drill instructor; from the terms homie and homeboy.
- Homesteading – Remaining at one duty station for an extended tour or consecutive tours.
- Honcho or Head Honcho – Person in charge, from the Japanese word for "boss', "hanchō"; also a nickname for Okinawan taxi drivers.
- Hooch – Field living quarters. Also tied into the term Hooch maid, which referred to a woman in Vietnam who would clean the dwellings of soldiers, which were deemed "hooches."
- Hot-Shit – Sarcastic reference to an overly arrogant person.
- Horse-cock Sandwich – Any sandwich or meal created using an unknown or mystery meat. Often, specifically, sliced bologna. Occasionally served as breakfast meat.
- House Mouse – Recruit tasked with cleaning and performing domestic chores in drill instructor-only areas. See also DI hut.
- Housewife – Girlfriend; also sewing kit.
- HQMC – Headquarters Marine Corps.
- HUA – (Hoo-ah – Not to be confused with Oorah or the Army Hooah) Heard, Understood and Acknowledged. Head up ass.
- Hump – Carry or lift a load, originally an Australian term meaning "to carry one's swag,"; also a forced march carrying full equipment loads.
- Hurry up and wait – Expression denoting inefficient time management or planning, often when a senior rushes a unit into a situation too fast that subsequently makes them wait. This can refer to the period between receiving a Warning Order and actually implementing an Operations Order.
- Huss – To give a helping hand, so named because the H-34 Choctaw helicopter's utility configuration was designated as the "HUS-1 Seahorse," leading to Vietnam-era Marines that needed a medical evacuation helicopter to ask for or to be "cut a huss".

== I ==
- IAW – In Accordance With, term often used to denote compliance with published orders or procedures.
- IG – Inspector General.
- ILBE – Improved load-bearing equipment, the newest iteration of personal combat gear, utilizes the PALS, replaced MOLLE.
- In Country – Phrase referring to being within a war zone.
- Incentive/Individual Training or IT – Physical training used as a punishment, especially in recruit training, sometimes nicknamed "incentive torture," "indoor tennis," or getting "thrashed/bent/slayed/destroyed" by recruits. See also pitting & quarterdecking.
- Inkstick – Pen
- Irish Pennant or IP – Any loose thread, string, or strap on a uniform or equipment that detracts from a perfect appearance.
- Iron Mike – Originally a nautical term for a gyrocompass; name for various memorial statues, such as at Parris Island, SC, Quantico, VA, and Belleau, France; nickname bestowed on Marines who score a perfect 300 points on the Physical Fitness Test; nickname for a company or battery named "M or "Mike" in NATO phonetic alphabet.
- IRR – Individual Ready Reserve, branch of the reserve that most former servicemembers fall under upon the end of active service, may be called to involuntarily return to active status.

== J ==
- JAG – Judge Advocate General, colloquial name for the legal entity within the Marine Corps, more properly called Judge Advocate Division, from the Judge Advocate General of the Navy, the naval officer who oversees both the Navy's and Marine Corps' legal entities; also, a television show by the same name.
- Jarhead – Pejorative term for a Marine. Jarhead has several supposed origins: the regulation "High and Tight" haircut resembles a mason jar (to add insult, some note that the jar is an empty vessel, also therefore a Marine's head an empty vessel); the Mason Jar Company stopped making jars and made the helmets for Marines during World War II.
- JAX – Jacksonville, North Carolina. Located outside Camp Lejeune. Also called J-ville; typical US military town.
- Jesus slippers or Jesus boots – Government-issue sandals or flip-flops for sanitation in showers. Also known as a "Boot from the Heavens". "Best boot I ever had". See also shower shoes.
- JETDS – Joint Electronics Type Designation System, used to categorize the nomenclature of electronic equipment.
- JEW – Junior enlisted warrior, E-3 and below.
- JJ DID TIE BUCKLE – Mnemonic for the 14 leadership traits: Justice, Judgement, Dependability, Initiative, Decisiveness, Tact, Integrity, Enthusiasm, Bearing, Unselfishness, Courage, Knowledge, Loyalty, Endurance.

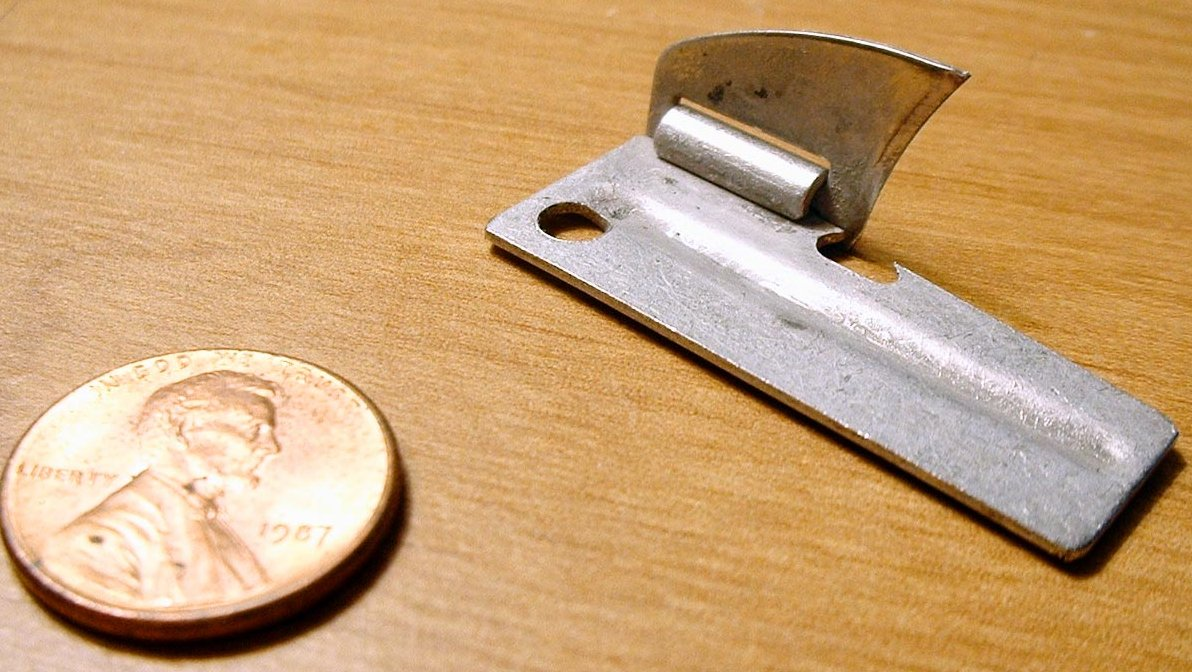
John Wayne

- JOB – Junk On the Bunk, a formal inspection of gear that takes place in the squad bay where the gear is placed on the rack in a predesignated order. Also known as 'Things On the Springs'.
- John Wayne – P-38 can opener, a small folding blade used to open canned rations (such as K-rations or C-rations), so named because the actor was shown in a training film using it.
- Joker – Military journalist, from Private Joker from the movie Full Metal Jacket; also a derogatory term for a junior enlisted servicemember. Also used by aviators when they have only 60 minutes of fuel remaining.
- JRTC – Joint Readiness Training Center, combat training center at Fort Polk Louisiana since 1993 (formerly at Fort Chaffee, Arkansas) that focuses on training Light Infantry Brigade sized units.
- Jungle Bunny – Vietnam War-era phrase for infantry.
- Junk on [the] Bunk – Inspection where all uniforms and equipment to be displayed is laid on the Marine's rack.

== K ==
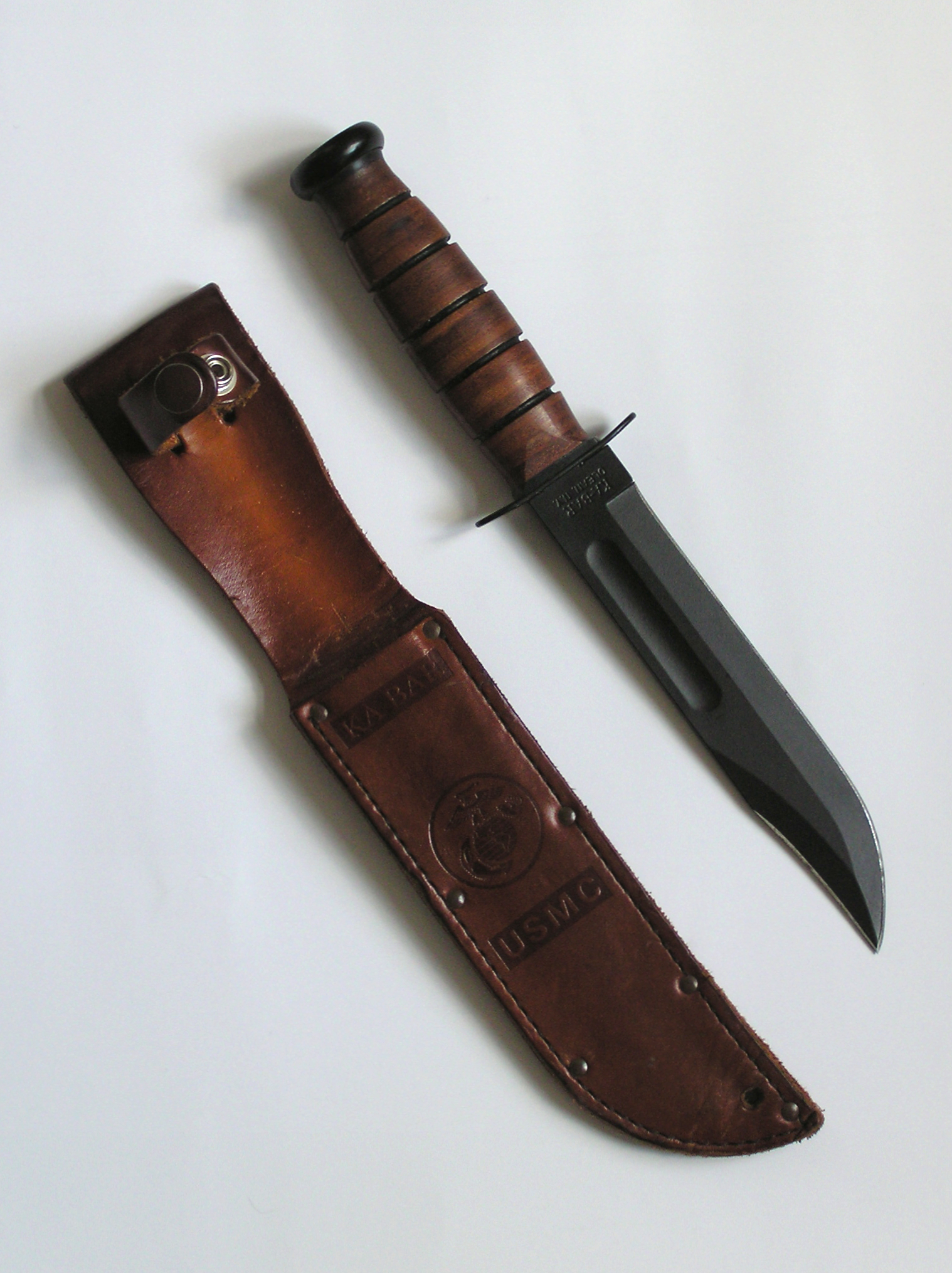
KA-BAR

- K or klicks – Kilometer.
- KA-BAR – Fighting/utility knife first issued during World War II.
- K-Bay – refers to Marine Corps Base Hawaii, from the name of the bay near the base, Kāneʻohe Bay.
- Keeper – Cloth loop on the green service blouse to hold the cloth belt neatly in place.
- Kelly Helmet or K-pot – 1917-model basin helmet worn during World War I until 1942.
- Kevlar – Helmet made from kevlar, specifically it originally referred to the PASGT helmet, but now refers to any ballistic helmet in general regardless of material composition.
- Keyboard Jockey – Person whose job causes him or her use a computer for a length of time.
- Kill – A positive affirmation.
- Kill Hat – A junior Drill Instructor who specializes in discipline and punishment. Also known as "Fourth Hat," "Third Hat," "Bobby," or "Bulldog." A kill hat can move up to the position of heavy hat after completing a set number of recruit instruction cycles.
- Kin Town – A small town located just outside Camp Hansen, Okinawa. Also called Kinville or Sinville.
- Kit – another term for the old web gear (LBE) when it included the butt-pack.
- Knowledge – Book.
- Kuni – Marine Corps Air Station Iwakuni.

== L ==
- Lad – term that came out of WW I for a young Marine.
- Ladderwell – Stairway or ladder connecting different decks of a ship, so named because naval stairs tend to incline at a grade so steep as to almost be vertical.
- Laminated – Perceived semi-permanent state of issue for a normally temporary status.
- Lance colonel – Derivation of lance corporal denoting a junior Marine with extended time in service or grade. See also terminal lance.
- Lance coolie, lance criminal, or lance coconut – derogatory terms for lance corporal.
- Lance Corporal Underground or Lance Corporal Network – Joking reference to the rapid spread of information by non-NCOs (which superiors are ignorant of); also refers to the spread of foolish rumors that a more experienced Marine would immediately recognize as false.
- Landing Gear – Crossed rifles exposed on the rank insignia of lllLance lllCorporals, lllCorporals, and sergeants.
- Land of the big PX – Used in reference to CONUS by Marines deployed overseas.
- Lawn Dart – Pejorative for various aircraft, possibly from the lawn dart effect.
- LBV – Load Bearing Vest, personal equipment used to keep the most commonly used items within easy reach utilizing the PALS, usually a component of MOLLE or ILBE.
- LCPLIC – Lance corporal in charge. A salty lance corporal.
- Lead Sled – nickname for the Basic Parachutist Insignia.
- Leatherneck – Nickname for Marine, so named for legends stating that stiff leather collars were once worn to protect the throat from sword-blows (also thought that high stocks were worn for discipline, to keep Marines' heads high and straight). The dress blue uniform still bears a high stock collar today. Also, Leatherneck Magazine.
- Leg – term for servicemembers who does not rate to wear the Parachutist Insignia, borrowed from the Army Airborne.
- Leggings – Leg coverings made of canvas with eyelets and laces or buckles to secure the trouser legs over boots.
- Liberty – Authorized free time ashore or off station, not counted as leave, known in the Army as a "pass".
- Liberty List – List containing the names of Marines entitled to liberty and those employed by the guard during the liberty period (and thus not entitled to leave post).
- Liberty Risk – A Marine with a high risk of getting into trouble on liberty.
- Lifer – Career servicemember, as opposed to one who serves for a single enlistment.
- Lima Charlie or Lickin' Chicken – Loud and Clear, an expression meaning that the communication has been received and understood; originally exclusive to radio traffic.
- Line Company – Lettered Marine companies or the aviation term for ground units, originally, an infantry company.
1st Lt (left) and Chief Warrant Officer 3 (right) insignias
- Lipstick Lieutenant – Pejorative for warrant officer, so named from the appearance of their rank insignia: the addition of red to the gold and silver bars of a lieutenant.
- Lollygag – Dawdle or fool about.
- Long Handles – Long sleeved/legged undershirt/shorts.
- Long War – Term for the war on terrorism favored by senior military leaders.
- Lost Lieutenant Finder – Hand-held GPS unit, a joke term on the reputation for new lieutenants to be incompetent in land navigation.
- LPCs – Abbreviation for Leather Personnel Carriers, aka combat boots
- LPD – Abbreviation for Landing Platform/Dock, aka Amphibious transport dock
- LT – Abbreviation for lieutenant, inappropriate to address as such verbally.
- LWH – LightWeight Helmet.
- LZ – Landing Zone, a clearing designated as the place where a helicopter (or other VTOL aircraft) can land.

== M ==
- Marjah Marines – Marines who served in the Battle For Marjah in 2010; may be from a number of units including 1st BTN 6th Marines, 2nd BTN 6th Marines, 3rd BTN 6th Marines, and 3rd BTN 10th Marines.
- M – A prefix to the model number of a specific nomenclature of equipment, generally considered to denote "model" or "mark". Also us in the phonetic alphabet for "Mike".
- Ma'am – Proper method of addressing female officers.
- Mac Marine – Nickname for Marine, popular during World War II, also the career planner popular on posters of the 1960s.
- Mad Max – term for a military vehicle that is irregular in appearance due to repairs, modifications or the presence of extra equipment in reference to the ramshackle appearance of vehicles the Mad Max movie franchise. See also hillbilly armor.
- Magic show – Communion rite
- Maggie's Drawers – Red flag attached to a pole, used to signal a miss on the rifle range, replaced by a red disk.
- MAGTF – Marine Air-Ground Task Force.
- MAGTFery – i.e., "Mag-taf-ery." Anything associated with MAGTF-type operations, or the unique structure of the Marine Corps MAGTF.

Master Guns

- Major – A Captain in command of a ship's Marine detachment. This title is used in order to avoid confusion with the ship's commanding officer, who is referred to as "Captain" even if he/she holds a lower rank.
- Mama-san – Term of endearment for an elder Japanese woman, often a maid, cook, or tailor/seamstress performing services for Marines; from the Japanese honorific "san".
- MARINE – Muscles Are Required, Intelligence Non-Essential, My Ass Really Is Navy Equipment, Mad Assholes Riding In Navy Equipment, pejorative backronyms used by other branches.
- Marine – The following nicknames are usually acceptable: leatherneck, devil dog, sea soldier, warrior, hard charger, motivator; the following are acceptable from other Marines: jarhead, gyrene; the following are grievous insults: soldier, seabag.
- Marine house – Security Guard term for living quarters for Marines, on or off embassy grounds.
- MARFORLANT – Marine Forces, Atlantic.
- MARFORPAC – Marine Forces, Pacific.
- MARSOC – Marine Forces, Special Operations Command.
- Marine Mattress – A woman who is thought to be sexually promiscuous with other Marines. The plural form is colloquially referred to as M&Ms.
- Master Guns or Master Gunny – Nicknames for a Master Gunnery Sergeant. Also sometimes referred to as "Maverick" due to the combination of slang for Master Sergeant ("Top") and Gunnery Sergeant ("Gunny"); derived from the call sign of Tom Cruise's character in the Top Gun films.
- MATMEP – Maintenance Training Management and Evaluation Program. Used to document individual formal and informal training in 6XXX series occupations (i.e., aviation maintenance); this information then rolls up to show an aviation unit's overall readiness to sustain operations. Sometimes referred to as "Me And The Marines Enjoy Paperwork" from the voluminous amounts of documentation generated.
- MCCLEO – Marine Corps Civilian Law Enforcement Officer. Civilian Law Enforcement for larger Marine installations. They work in conjunction to Marine MP's and are led by a chief or deputy chief of police, who in turn answers to the base provost marshal.
- MCI – Marine Corps Institute, a distance education program; also, the courses available to Marines for bonus promotion credit.
- MCCS – Marine Corps Community Services (also known by the humorous backronym Marine Corps Crime Syndicate)
- MCMAP, MCNinja – Marine Corps Martial Arts Program.
- MCT – Marine Combat Training, infantry skills training for non-infantry Marines.
- MCSF – Marine Corps Security Forces (Company) usually a company-size unit assigned to the security of naval assets. MOS 8152, MCSF School is at NSGA Northwest VA, and due to the intense marksmanship training Marines are known as 'Gunslingers', Marine Corps Super Friends.
- Meat Gazer – Urinalysis observer who observes the servicemember peeing into the sample container to prevent tampering with the sample.
- MEB – Marine Expeditionary Brigade.
- MEDEVAC or Medivac – MEDical EVACuation, removing a wounded person to the closest medical or triage facility using designated ambulance equipment, vehicles, or aircraft. See also CASEVAC.
- Med Float Widow – Unfaithful wife of a Marine or Sailor deployed from the East Coast on a float a.k.a. float widow
- MEF – Marine Expeditionary Force.
- Men's Department – A retort for when some wise-ass says, "The Marine Corps is a Department of the Navy". The appropriate verbal response is, "Yeah, the Men's Department".
- MEPS – Military Entrance Processing Station, facility where prospective recruits are screened medically, psychologically, and legally for recruit training.
- Mess Hall – Cafeteria. See also chow hall.
- Messman – cook.
- MEU – Marine Expeditionary Unit.
- MEU(SOC) – Marine Expeditionary Unit (Special Operations Capable); 11th MEU(SOC), 13th MEU(SOC), 15th MEU(SOC), 22nd MEU(SOC), 24th MEU(SOC), 26th MEU(SOC) or 31st MEU(SOC).
- Mickey Mouse Boots – Boots designed for extreme cold weather using an air bladder for insulation, so named for their oversized and bloated appearance.
- Midrats – Midnight (or other late-night) rations provided for servicemembers who work late hours.
- Mike – Minute.
- Mike-mike – Millimeter.
- MILES – Multiple Integrated Laser Engagement System; a system used to simulate battle consisting of sensors worn by soldiers and emitters mounted on weapons.
- Military Left – Pertaining to the left side of something or the direction to the left of the subject in question. Used sarcastically when giving orders when a subordinate turns the wrong way or is unsure of which way to turn.
- Military Right – Pertaining to the right side of something or the direction to the right of the subject in question. Used sarcastically when giving orders when a subordinate turns the wrong way or is unsure of which way to turn.
- Military Time – The time of day on a 24-hour clock. General Wallace M. Greene forbade the practice of suffixing the unnecessary word "hours" after each indication of time of day ("1330" or "thirteen-thirty" instead of "1330 hours"); the practice of saying "oh" instead of "zero" for hours before 1000 has diminished as well.

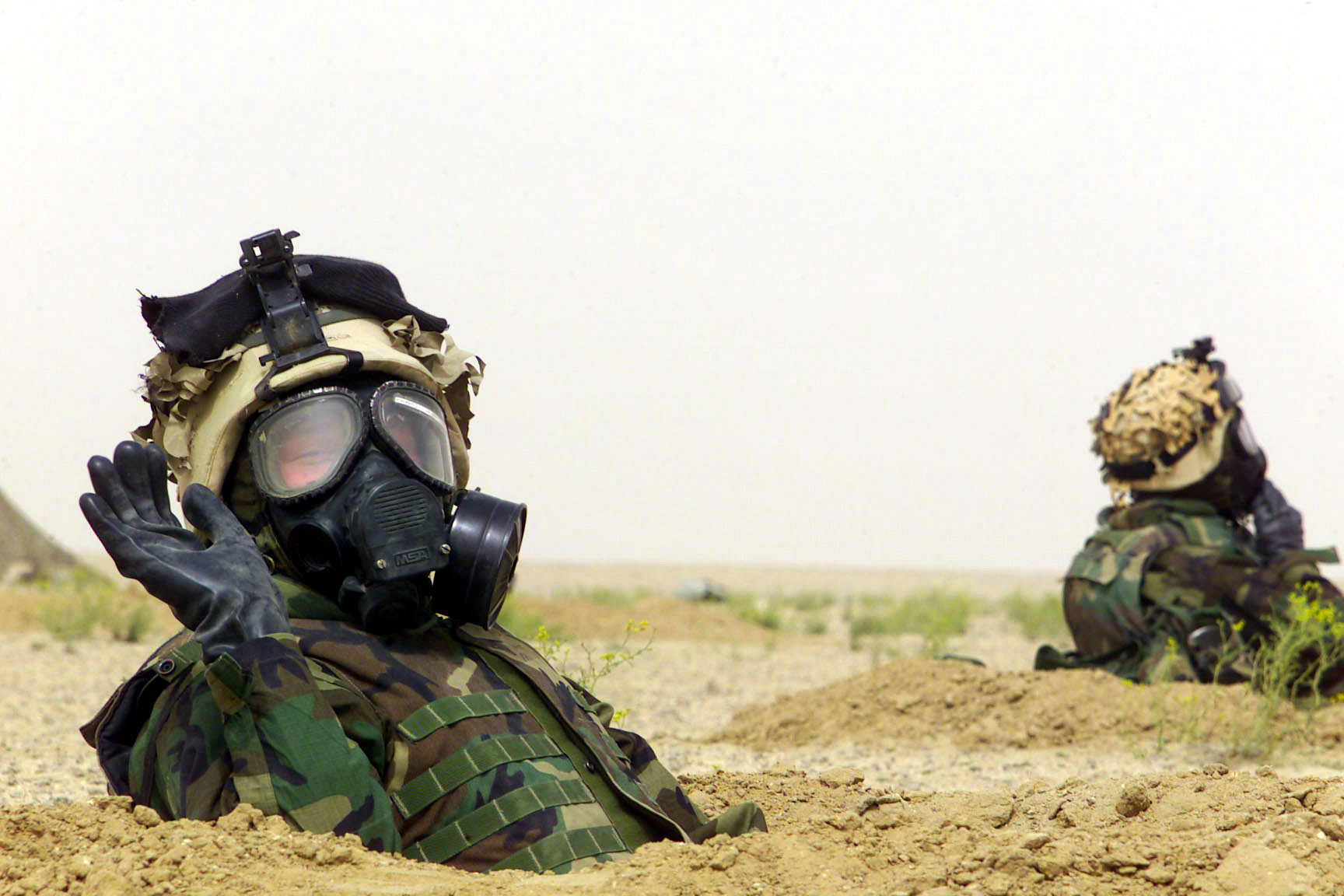
MOPP equipment

- MOLLE – Modular lightweight load-carrying equipment, type of load-bearing equipment utilizing the PALS, replaced ALICE and replaced by ILBE.
- Molly Marine – Nickname associated with World War II era female Marines. Also the name of the award given to the top ranking female Marine in her recruit platoon.
- Monkey Suit – Slang for the MARPAT uniform, otherwise known as digital cammies.
- Moonbeam – Flashlight.
- MOPP – Mission Oriented Protective Posture, or an out-of-date term for the defense equipment (gas masks and overgarment suits) worn to protect against Nuclear, Biological, and Chemical weapons.
- Mosquito Wings or Skeeter Wings – Rank insignia for a private first class, a single chevron.
- Motivator – Term of endearment from a senior to a junior Marine, so named when the junior displays motivation for their duties.
- Moto – short for Motivated/motivating: A person, object, or event that would motivate an individual Marine.
- Moto Tats – tattoos displaying USMC logos or slogans, often gotten by young Marines right out of basic training, that are looked upon as being overly gratuitous and boastful.
- Motarded – Displaying excess motivation, often in the form of visual symbols and lore (such as unit logos); a combination of the terms "moto" and "retarded".
- Motor T or MT – Motor Transport, a subunit of Marines responsible for the operation and maintenance of wheeled non-combat and non-engineer vehicles.
- MOUT – Military Operation in Urban Terrain. See also CQB/CQC.
- MOS – Military Occupational Specialty, a job classification.
- MP – Military Police, mostly replaced by PMO.
- MRE – Meal, Ready-to-Eat, standard U.S. field ration. Sometimes jokingly referred to with backronyms such as "Meals Rejected by the Enemy," "Meals Rejected by Ethiopia," "Meal, Rotten to Eject," "Meals Rarely Eaten," "Meal, Refusing to Exit" (in reference to the widespread belief that the meals purposely cause constipation), "Meal, Reluctant to Exit," "Mister E," or the "Three Lies for the Price of One".
- MRE bomb – Bursting plastic bag made from chemical heating pouches found inside of a standard MRE.
- MSG – Marine Corps Security Guard, responsible for guarding United States Embassies.
- MTO – Motor Transport Officer, the Marine in charge of maintenance and operation of a unit's trucks.
- MTV – Modular Tactical Vest, a type of ballistic vest worn by Marines.
- MTVR – Medium Tactical Vehicle Replacement See also 7-ton.
- Mustang/Mustanger – Marine Officer who has previously served in the enlisted ranks.
- Muster (Gather) – formal gathering of troops, especially for inspection, display, or exercise.
- MWD – Military Working Dog, a trained government canine for law enforcement, detection of explosives or drugs, sentry, or other military use(s).
- Mystery Meat – A low quality unknown type of meat patty served at Marine Corps Recruit Depot San Diego.

== N ==
NCIS logo

- NAVY – Never Again Volunteer Yourself, Never Actually Ventures Yonder, pejorative backronym used by sailors who regret volunteering or are otherwise dissatisfied with their post.
- NBCD – Nuclear, Biological, Chemical Defense. See also CBRN. Need Bitches Call, No Body Cares.
- NCIS – Naval Criminal Investigative Service, the primary law enforcement agency of the DoN, also a group of television shows focused on the agency.
- NCO – Non-commissioned officer: corporal or sergeant; the Army term "noncom" is no longer appropriate.
- NCOIC – Non-Commissioned Officer In Charge, an NCO responsible for a group of Marines, but without the authority of a commissioned officer; also used to refer to the senior enlisted Marine acting with the officer in charge. See also OIC & SNCOIC.
- NIG – Stands for "Non Infantry Grunt" nickname given to POGs typically when they have won the respect of their infantry counterparts and demonstrate proficiency in Infantry tactics.
- NJP or Ninja Punch – Non-Judicial Punishment, a legal proceeding much like a court-martial of much smaller scope. A commanding officer is authorized to issue summary punishments at office hours (called Captain's Mast afloat) under Article 15, UCMJ, to punish offenses too serious to be dealt with by a mere rebuke, but not serious enough to warrant court-martial.
- NMCI – Navy/Marine Corps Intranet, the program that outsources garrison information technology services for the Department of the Navy, sometimes jokingly referred to as "Non-Mission-Capable Internet".
- Non-rate – Junior to the NCO ranks: a private, private first class, or lance corporal; borrowed from naval use, where personnel below the petty officer ranks had no rating, thus "non-rated men."
- No impact, no idea – Expression denoting a miss on a weapons range (the scorer cannot find an impact on target); also used as an "I don't know" response.
- North Carolina Lawn Dart – Expression denoting the AV-8 and the many mishaps that took place during the aircraft's development and testing.
- NROTC – Naval Reserve Officer Training Corps, a college-based recruiting program for officers for the Navy and Marine Corps.
- NUGIT or NUG – New Unqualified Guy/Gal In Training is an acronym used in Naval/Marine Corps aviation to describe a new maintainer or crew member that has no qualifications. This acronym is pronounced similar to the word "nugget," and is often shortened to "Nug." This term bears a similar connotation to the Marine Corps slang term "boot."

== O ==
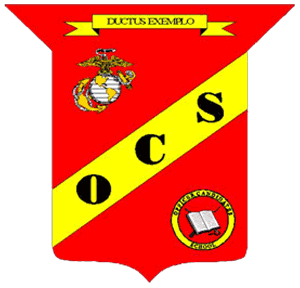
OCS logo

- OCONUS – Outside CONtinental United States, as opposed to CONUS.
- O-Course – Obstacle course.
- OCS – Officer Candidate School, recruit training for officers.
- O-dark thirty – Very early hours before dawn. See also military time, Zero-dark thirty. The custom of saying "oh" instead of zero has diminished, but remains in this expression.
- Office Hours – Administrative ceremony where legal, disciplinary, and other matters (such as praise, special requests, etc.) are attended, designed to dramatize praise and admonition, in a dignified, disciplined manner, out of the ordinary routine. Known as Captain's Mast afloat. An award given during a positive office hours or Mast is known as a Meritorious Mast, a negative office hours with punishment awarded is an example of non-judicial punishment.
- Officers' Country – Living spaces for officers aboard ship, or portion of post or station allocated for the exclusive use of officers.
- Oki – Okinawa.
- Old Asia Hand – Person with more than one tour in Asia.
- Old Man – Very informal nickname for the commanding officer, considered an inappropriate term of endearment for use by a junior, thus used in reference but never in address.
- OMPF – Official Military Personnel File, a record of all awards, punishments, training, and other records compiled by Headquarters Marine Corps.
- Oorah – Spirited cry used since the mid-20th century, comparable to Hooah used in the Army or Hooyah by Navy SEALs; most commonly used to respond to a verbal greeting or as an expression of enthusiasm. The origin is often disputed.
- OP – Observation Post, a position used for reconnaissance; also, the post newspaper of Marine Corps Air Ground Combat Center Twentynine Palms.
- OQR – Officer Qualification Record, a service record for officers, much like an enlisted Marine's SRB.
- OOB – Out Of Bounds, or straying into an area restricted from use by normal traffic, prohibited to Marines, or too far from base for a given liberty period.
- OOD – Officer Of the Deck, or the senior Marine responsible for the patrol and security of a unit's garrison working spaces and sleeping quarters after working hours, usually responsible for subordinate sentries and acts as a guard commander. See also duty & firewatch
- Oscar Mike – On the Move, the names of the two NATO phonetic alphabet letters O and M, which stand for the phrase. Used on the radio and in shorthand to each other. See also NATO phonetic alphabet
- OTV – Outer Tactical Vest, militarized version of Interceptor body armor, a common type of ballistic vest; being replaced by the MTV.
- Outside – Civilian life after discharge. See also real world.
- Overhead – Ceiling.
- Over the Hill – Excessively old, or a Marine so long in the service they have become institutionalized.

== P ==
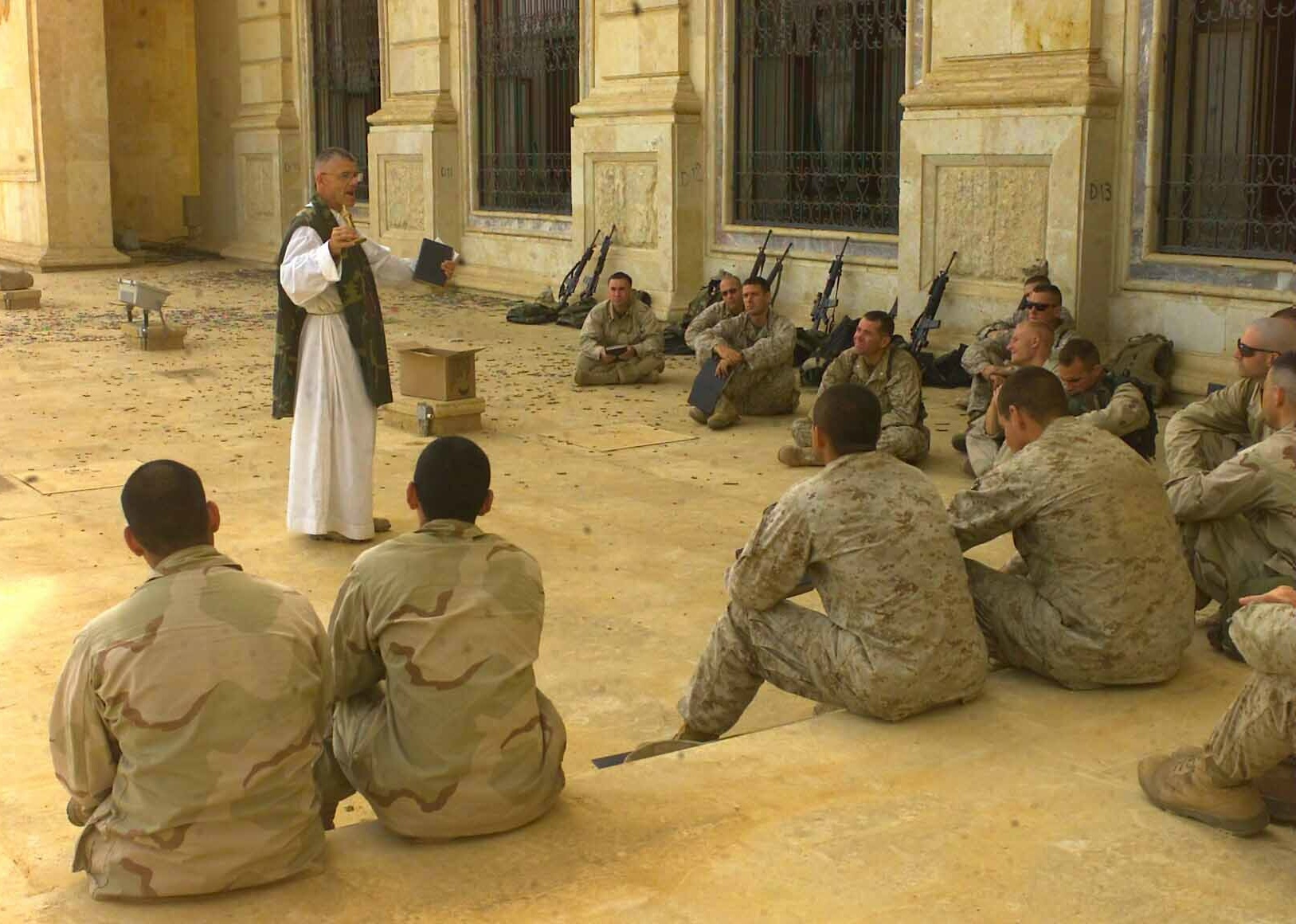
padre conducting mass

- Padre – chaplain, usually Catholic, from the Spanish and Italian terms for "father".
- PALS – Pouch Attachment Ladder System, a webbing system used to attach combat accessories to MOLLE and ILBE equipment.
- Page 11 – NAVMC 118(11), a page of a Marine's Service Record Book or Officer Qualification Record where administrative remarks are made concerning a Marine's performance and conduct, and which may contain negative recommendations regarding promotion or re-enlistment; while not a punishment itself or inherently negative, it is part of a Marine's permanent service record and used as a basis for administrative decisions regarding a Marine's career; the term commonly refers to an entry itself made in this section.
- Parade Deck – Area set aside for the conduct of parades, drill, and ceremonies, often paved or well-maintained lawn. See also grinder.
- Paradise Island – Nickname for Marine Corps Recruit Depot Parris Island.
- Passageway – Corridor or hallway.
- Passed over – Having failed selection for the next higher rank (for SNCOs and officers).
- Pay Grade – DOD system of designating a U.S. serviceperson's pay (E-1 through E-9, W-1 through W-5, and O-1 through O-10), not to be confused with rank (though the two usually correspond) or billet.
- PCP – Physical Conditioning Program, exercise regimen for Marines failing to meet the minimum physical requirements; also Physical Conditioning Platoon, for the unit where a physically unfit recruit is sent prior to recruit training, nicknamed Pork Chop Platoon.
- PCS – Permanent Change of Station, transfer to another post, station, base, or installation.
- PET-qual – An exemption that can be granted by a company-level commander to shooters that have two prior Expert qualifications. The shooter will not have to fire that year, but will not earn an additional Expert qualification. PET-qual simply allows the shooter to extend their second Expert status an additional year. The acronym stands for "Prior Expert Twice" qualification.
- PFC – Private First Class. E-2
- PFT – Physical Fitness Test, a semiannual test measuring strength, agility, and endurance by scoring performance in pull-ups (flexed-arm hang for females), abdominal crunches, and a 3-mile run.
- PRT – Physical Readiness Test, an annual test conducted in utilities, with rifle and web gear. consisted of a rope climb, step-ups, fireman's carry, fire & maneuver course and a 3-mile run.
- Phrog – Nickname for CH-46 Sea Knight.
- Phone Watch – Duty where a Marine is responsible for answering phones when others are busy or unavailable (such as lunch hours); also the person filling the duty.
- PI – Marine Corps Recruit Depot Parris Island; formerly also Philippine Islands, a frequent port of call for Pacific Marines until 1992
- Pickle Suit – Service "A" uniform, from its all over green appearance.

pogey rope

- Pinning or Pinning On – Promotion by pinning the new rank insignia onto the MCCUU collar; also a form of hazing by striking the pins into the wearer's chest.
- Pisscutter – Nickname for soft green garrison cap worn with the service uniform. See also fore-and-aft cap.
- (The) Pits – Depressed area on a shooting range where the targets are located, shooters staff it by marking, raising, and lowering targets from behind a berm. See also butts and pulling butts / pits.
- Pitting – Incentive training for a large group of recruits, so named for the sandy pits set aside for such events. See also quarterdecking.
- Pizza Box – The Marksman Weapons Qualification Badge, so named for its square shape.
- Pizza Stain – A nickname used by some Marines during recruit training to refer to the National Defense Service Medal, so named for the red and yellow appearance, like the cheese and sauce of a pizza.
- Platoon Sergeant – SNCO executive to the platoon commander, usually the senior enlisted man.
- PMCM – Equipment such as aircraft that are partially mission capable due to maintenance that needs to be performed. Parts are available but not manpower.
- PMCS – Preventive Maintenance Checks and Services, regularly performed maintenance on equipment, as opposed to corrective maintenance. Also, partial mission capability of equipment such as aircraft due to parts shortage in the supply chain.
- PMO – Provost Marshal's Office, the military police force of a Marine installation.
- P.O.A. – Position Of Attention Position of Attention.
- POG, Poge, Pogue – Persons other than Grunts; Marines who fill non-combat roles (cooks, mechanics, etc.)
- Poguey or Pogey Bait – Candy or sweets. See also geedunk.
- Poguey or Pogey Rope – The French Fourragère authorized for wear by members of the 5th and 6th Marine Regiments.
- Police – To pick up items (such as litter or expended ammunition casings), to return an area to a natural state, or to correct another Marine.
- Poncho Liner – Insulating blanket used to warm the individual wearing a rain poncho, often used as a stand-alone blanket.
- Poolee – Name given to newly enlisted or preparing to enlist individuals. They are part of a pool of hopeful Marines, managed by the Marine Recruiters at the local recruiting offices. Poolees meet nearly every weekend at the recruiting office to exercise, practice drill, learn Marine Corps history and the like. Being in the pool is a good opportunity to keep new and hopeful enlistees from getting into trouble. Poolees at a well managed program are more often than not more successful at Boot Camp because of their preparations.
- Pop Smoke – To leave quickly or hastily; from the method of throwing a smoke grenade to mark a landing zone or conceal a retreat.
- Port – Naval term for "left side of ship" when on board a ship and facing forward, opposite of starboard. "Port" is the same with respect to a ship regardless of where a person is located or which way a person is facing, whereas "left" might be ambiguous.
- Portholes – military issue eyeglasses, or the wearer of glasses. See also BCGs & RPGs.
- Pot Shack – Place where cooking utensils are washed.
- Possible – Slang term for the highest score possible in a marksmanship exercise as in "shooting a possible"; used on the rifle range during Recruit Training to denote the shooter possibly achieving a perfect score in a given round of firing.
- Pos – Radio lingo for position; pronounced as "paws"
- Powder Monkey – Name used within Field Artillery for the Marine whose job it is to prepare the powder/propellant needed for a specific fire mission. Although every crew member is trained to perform each job, the responsibility of preparing powder increments for non-fixed ammunition normally falls upon the most junior member of a gun crew.
- PowerPoint Ranger – Pejorative for Marines (usually officers) who have spent too much time in an office and are known for giving PowerPoint presentations.
- Prick – Slang for any equipment bearing the "PRC" JETDS designator, usually man-portable radios.
- Pro & Cons – Contraction of "Proficiency and Conduct marks", a numeric system for evaluating enlisted Marines. Usually written or spoken consecutively, with the first being Proficiency and the second being Conduct, e.g. 4.5/4.8. Hypothetically, the scale is from 0.0 to 5.0, but a perfect 5.0 is so rare that a Marine who receive is called a "water-walker" (in reference to Mark 6:48) and the worst marks awarded almost never fall below 2.0.
- Property Cage – Place where organizational property is stored, often a warehouse.
- PT – Physical Training, physical exercise to build or maintain strength, agility, and flexibility.
- Pucker Factor – High level of anxiety experienced by those in tight situations, usually aircrew.
- Pull Butts – To mark and score targets on a shooting range from behind a berm. See also butts & pits.
- PX – Post eXchange; more properly the Marine Corps Exchange.

== Q ==
- QRF – Quick Reaction Force, a highly mobile stand-by force designed to add firepower in precise places as the commander decides on a changing battlefield, often used for MEDEVAC purposes.
- Quarter Deck – A location of prominence in a barracks or office; in recruit training, this area by the drill instructor's office is usually off-limits to recruits except during ceremonial discipline; the term comes from the quarter deck of a ship defined as "the part of the upper deck abaft the mainmast, including the poop deck when there is one. Usually reserved for ship's officers, guests, and passengers."
- Quarterdecking – Incentive training at recruit training by means of repetitive and constant physical exercises, so named because it is usually a recruit's only opportunity to visit the quarterdeck. See also pitting.
- Quarters – Housing, whether bachelor (barracks) or family (government-leased apartments or houses); or periodic, muster of a ship's company.
- Quatrefoil – Four-pointed embroidered pattern stitched on to the top of a Marine officer's barracks cover, from the tradition of wearing it to be identified as friendly to Marine sharpshooters during boarding actions in the era of wooden sailing ships.

== R ==
- R/S – Respectfully Submitted, used as an end greeting in written communication.
- Rack or Sack – Bed, inappropriate to use the Army term "bunk" except when used in conjunction with "junk on the bunk".
- Radio Watch – Duty monitoring radio networks for relevant traffic, also; the person filling that duty.
- Rah – A shortened version of Ooh-rah
- Raider Cap – cover worn with the M1941 HBT utilities
- Rain Locker – Shower.
- Ranks – There are no acceptable contractions or shortened ways of addressing the following: private, lance corporal, corporal, sergeant, staff sergeant, sergeant major, warrant officer/chief warrant officer, major, colonel, and general. The following may be addressed with permission or informally: private first class as PFC, a gunnery sergeant as "Gunny", a master sergeant as "top", a master gunnery sergeant as "Master Gunny" or "Master Guns", a second lieutenant or first lieutenant as "Lieutenant", a captain as "Skipper", a lieutenant colonel as "Colonel", and a brigadier general, major general, and lieutenant general as "General". It is inappropriate to abbreviate an enlisted Marine's rank (staff sergeant or above) as "Sergeant," nor can the nickname "sarge" be used. Appropriate written abbreviations for all ranks can be found on United States Marine Corps rank insignia.
- Ratfuck – Taking the best available selection and leaving less desirable alternatives for others.
- RCO – Rifle Combat Optic, optical sight issued for use with the M16A4 service rifle or M4 carbine; see also Advanced Combat Optical Gunsight.
- Real World – Civilian life after discharge. See also outside.
- Rear Echelon Pogue – Pejorative for a person who chooses to stay behind the lines to avoid danger; someone assigned to duty to the rear of the battle lines.
- Rear Party: The Rear Party is generally a small number of Marines that stay "in country" for a longer period of time than the majority of the battalion. The Rear Party functions as the element to finalize the location after the battalion departs.
- Recon – Used as a verb to denote stealthy acquisition by theft. Not to be confused with "Recon". See also acquire.

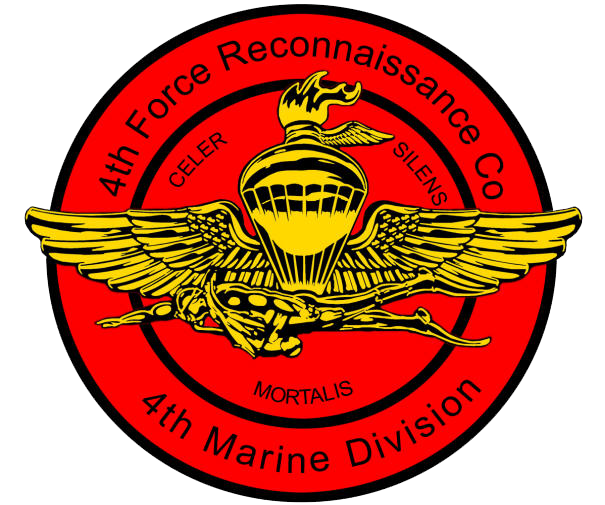
4th Force Reconnaissance Company insignia, colloquially known as a "Recon Jack"

- Recon Jack – general term for recon insignias, normally with features depicting "jack of all trades": airborne, scuba, combatant swimmer.
- Red Leg – Artilleryman. See also cannon cocker and gun bunny.
- Red Patch – Device worn on the uniforms of landing support Marines to distinguish the shore party from landing troops.
- Request Mast – Appealing to increasingly higher links in the chain of command in order to seek satisfaction for a grievance the requester feels was not adequately handled at a lower level; DoN orders permit any Marine to request mast up to the individual's commanding general without repercussions.
- Re-up – Reenlist, an Army term that has made its way into the vernacular for volunteering for an additional period of service. The correct term is Ship-over.
- Reverse Raider – Derogatory term for MARSOC Marines, due to their reputed tendency to assume they are superior to regular Marines. Many in the Marine Reconnaissance community see MARSOC as wanting to emulate the Marine Raiders of WWII, which they are not meant to be.
- RFI – Request For Information; Ready For Issue – Gear that has been repaired and placed back in supply.
- RHIP – Rank Has Its Privilege's.
- RIP – Relief in Place. A common method of handing over an area to an incoming unit during deployment. A small contingent of the prior unit will stay with the new unit for a period of time to help acclimate them with the AO.
- River City – Slang for reduced communications. It usually refers to a situation when the unit's communication systems are temporarily shut down. This could occur to preserve operations security before a maneuver or if a unit sustains casualties to ensure family members are notified through the proper channels.
- Roach coach – a.k.a. Gut Truck – Civilian vehicle allowed on base to sell fast food (see Pogey Bait).
- Rocks and Shoals – Articles for the Government of the Navy, the pre-UCMJ code of law for the United States Department of the Navy.
- Rotate – Return home at the end of a deployment.
- ROE – Rules Of Engagement, the restrictions on when and how a servicemember may use force on the enemy and other forces.
- Rubber Bitch – Name given to the ISO mat or sleeping pad made of a rubber foam-like material. It is used by Marines when sleeping on the ground or other hard surfaces. It is sometimes used during PT (physical training) for calisthenics.
- Running Lights – Navigational night lights on a ship; or the small red rectangular Red Patch sewn onto the uniforms of landing support team Marines; a person's eyes.

== S ==
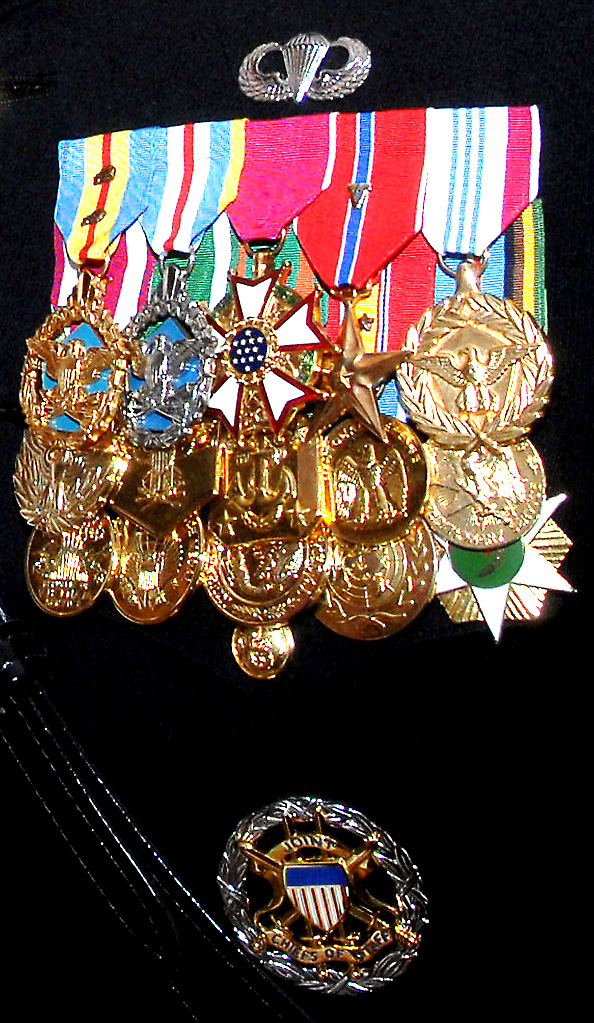
Peter Pace's salad

- SACO – Substance Abuse Control Officer, a Marine responsible for the initial screening and evaluation of a Marine or sailor with alcoholism or illegal drug use issues to the proper medical facilities for rehabilitation & treatment.
- SAFE – Mnemonic for the set up of weapons in small-unit defense, denotes: Security, Automatic weapons, Fields of fire, Entrenchment.
- SAFE – Slow easy movements, Apply natural buoyancy, Full lung inflation, Extreme relaxation. Covered during SWIM phase of boot camp, intended to explain course of action while lost at sea with or without flotation devices.
- Safety Brief – Usually given by an NCO to junior enlisted Marines prior to being released for liberty. "Marines if you are going to drink, don't drive, if you are going to drive, don't drink, if you meet some gal be smart and use a condom (if you can't wrap it, smack it, as my sergeant would tell us) etc..."
- S/F – Abbreviation for Semper Fidelis when used as a valediction, or closing statement, in written or typed communication (i.e. letters, emails, texts)
- Sailor – The following nicknames are usually acceptable: bluejacket, tar, whitehat; while the following are considered insults: gob, swab, swabbie, swab jockey, squid, anchor clanker, rust picker, deck ape.
- Salt, Salty, or Salt/salty dog – Experienced or well-worn person or object, from the salt that would accumulate after long-term exposure to seawater.
- Salty Language – Profanity.
- Sandbox – Iraq or other desert area.
- Sand Monster – To bury/hide something in the sand, usually MRE trash and brass. (Locale to 29 Palms)
- SARC – Sexual Assault Response Coordinator, a Marine (usually an SNCO) assigned as the point of contact for personnel who are victims of or witnesses to sexual assault. Such duty is often ironically assigned to one of the least tactful/sensitive members of a unit. Not to be confused with Special Amphibious Reconnaissance Corpsman, who serve in Marine Reconnaissance Units and with Marine Corps Special Operations Command (MARSOC) as highly trained Special Operations Forces Combat Medics (SOCM).
- Say Again (Your Last) – Request to repeat a statement, question, or order, especially over a radio, or as "I say again" to preface a repetition by the sender; the word "repeat" is not to be used in this context, as it calls for a preceding fire mission to be fired again.
- Sayōnara – Japanese for "goodbye".
- Schmuckatelli – Generic, unnamed junior Marine, from the Yiddish pejorative "schmuck". Often gets into trouble, especially when accompanied by his friend Benotz.
- SCIF – Sensitive Compartmented Information Facility, a place classified materials are processed or stored.
- scrambled eggs – Gold oak leaf embroidery found on field grade and general officers' barracks cap visors and mess dress cuffs.
- Scrounge – Appropriate, borrow, or acquire (possibly by doubtful means); derived from "scringe," meaning to search about, rummage, or pilfer.
- Scullery – Place where dishes are washed.
- Scuttlebutt – Gossip; or a drinking fountain, from "butt" (cask) and "scuttle" (a hole in a ship's side at deck level that allows water to drain from the deck), a cask that had an opening fitted with a spigot used to contain fresh water for drinking purposes. Because people gathered around a scuttlebutt, gossip, rumors, and sea stories are also known as scuttlebutt.
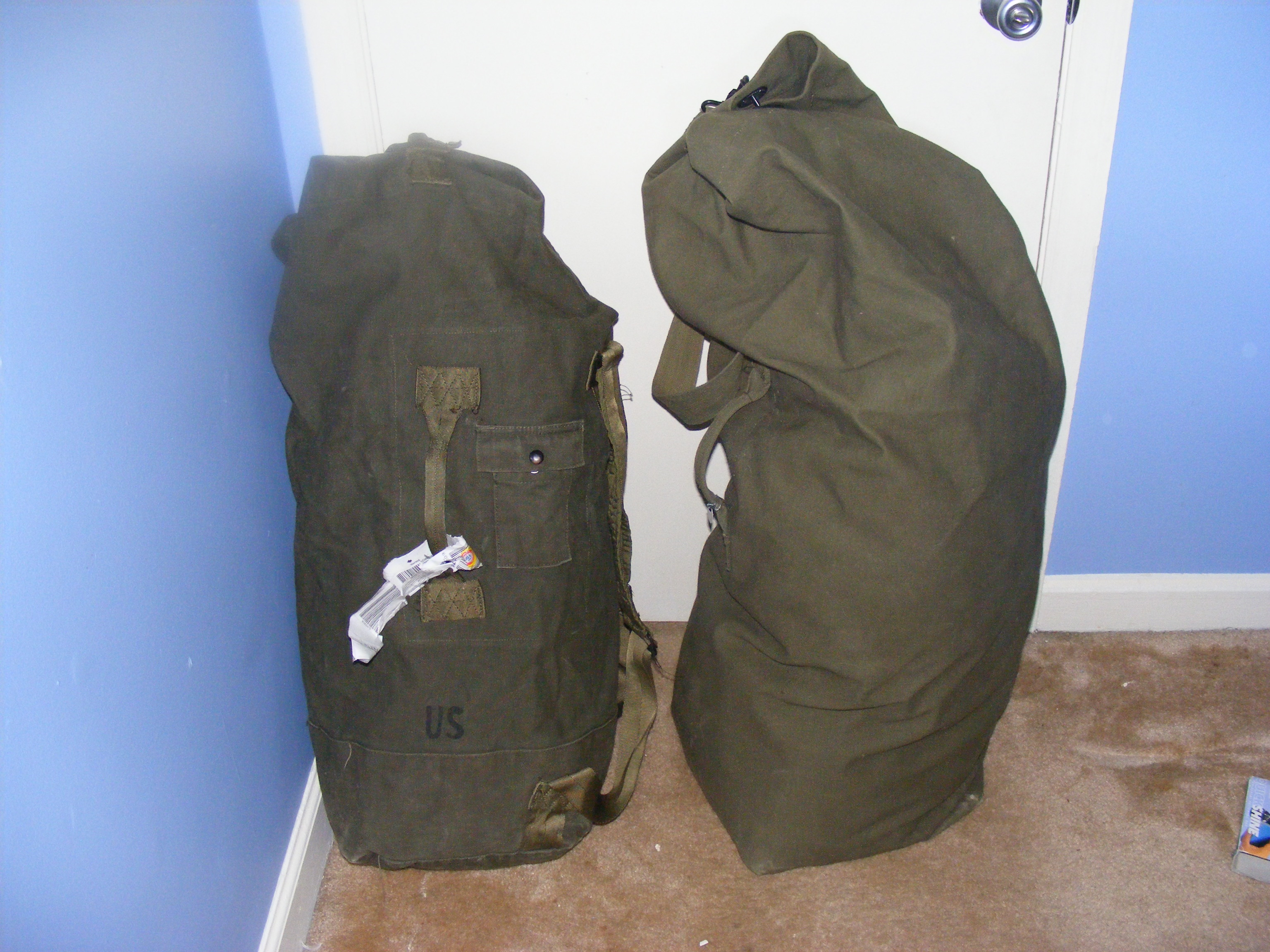
  seabags
- SDI – Senior Drill Instructor, the leader of a recruit platoon.
- Seabag or Sea Bag – Duffel bag used to carry one's personal belongings. "Duffel bag" is an Army term not used by Marines.
- Seabag Drag – Manually carrying personal items (often within seabags) to new or temporary living quarters.
- Seagoing Bellhop – Derogatory term for a Marine stationed aboard a ship on sea duty.
- Sea Lawyer – Person who attempts to argue by continually providing explanations for minutiae.
- Sea Story – Story, tale, or yarn calculated to impress others, often contains exaggeration or even outright lies.
- Secret Squirrel – Related to intelligence personnel, or any kind of clandestine, covert, classified, or confidential activity or information.
- Section Six - A recent recruit who is suicidal due to being unable to meet and cope with the demands of basic training.
- Secure – Stop, cease; or put away and lock.
- Semper Fi – Shortened version of "Semper Fidelis", the motto of the Corps, Latin for "always faithful". Can be used ironically, as in, "Semper Fi, Mac", which basically means, "That's the breaks," or "Too fucking bad."
- Semper Fu – Marine Corps martial arts
- Semper Gumby – Colloquialism denoting tactical flexibility and the ability to quickly adapt to changing circumstances, from the flexibility of the character in the children's animated show Gumby.
- Semper I – Colloquialism denoting selfish or self-centered behavior.
- Semper Sometimes – Appropriation of Semper Fi used to deride the part-time nature of service in the Marine Corps Reserve.
- Shellback – Marine who has taken part in the crossing of the line ceremony or crossing the equator ceremony while on a naval vessel.
- Ship Over – To reenlist for an additional period of service.
- Shit Bag or Shitbird – Habitually unkempt or undisciplined Marine. Also called a "10 percenter."
- Shit-Brick – Useless or ignorant person.
- Shitcan – (noun) Trash can or other garbage container; (verb) To dismiss someone from their current assignment and give them a much less desirable one.
- Shit Detail – An undesirable (usually temporary) assignment.
- Shit-Hot – Term used to notify something as exceptional or very good. Not to be confused with Hot-Shit
- Shitter – Bathroom, head, or latrine, most often an outdoor portable toilet or outhouse. Also a nickname for the CH-53 helicopter.
- Shooter – Person whose primary duty involves marksmanship with a rifle or pistol, such as students at a rifle range or competition team members.
- Shore Party – Landing support specialists that direct the disposition of troops during an amphibious assault.
- Short-timer – Person nearing the completion of his/her present tour of duty or enlistment.
- Short-timer's Disease – Apathy to duties and regulations from a person nearing EAS.
- Shove Off – To leave the vicinity, from the naval term meaning to push a boat off the shore or pier.
- Shower Shoes – Pair of rubber sandals issued to recruits to prevent foot infections from the use of community or shared showers. See also Jesus shoes. Also sometimes used as a facetious, almost-always joking pejorative term for new Marines (implying that they do not yet deserve to be called "boots" due to their lack of experience).
- Sick bay – Infirmary or other medical facility aboard ship, can also refer to aid stations ashore. See also BAS.
- Sick Call – Daily period when routine ailments are treated at sick bay.
- Sick Call Commando – Person who constantly finds medical reasons to avoid work, may suffer from a factitious disorder such as hypochondriasis, Munchausen syndrome, or malingering. More commonly referred to as sickbay commando.
- Sidearm – Weapon (usually a pistol) carried by a sentry under arms; also, cream and sugar in coffee.
- Side Straddle Hop – Jumping Jack.
- Silver Bullet – Rectal thermometer used to check the core temperature of a person suffering from heat-related injuries, such as hyperthermia; often referred to as an incentive to avoid dehydration.
- Skate – Avoiding work by finding an excuse to be elsewhere or unavailable by doing something easier (but important enough to avoid re-tasking); also used as an adjective to describe such an easier duty.
- Skid squadron – Marine Light Attack Helicopter Squadron, so named because the assigned helicopters (AH-1 & UH-1) utilize skids instead of wheels for undercarriage.

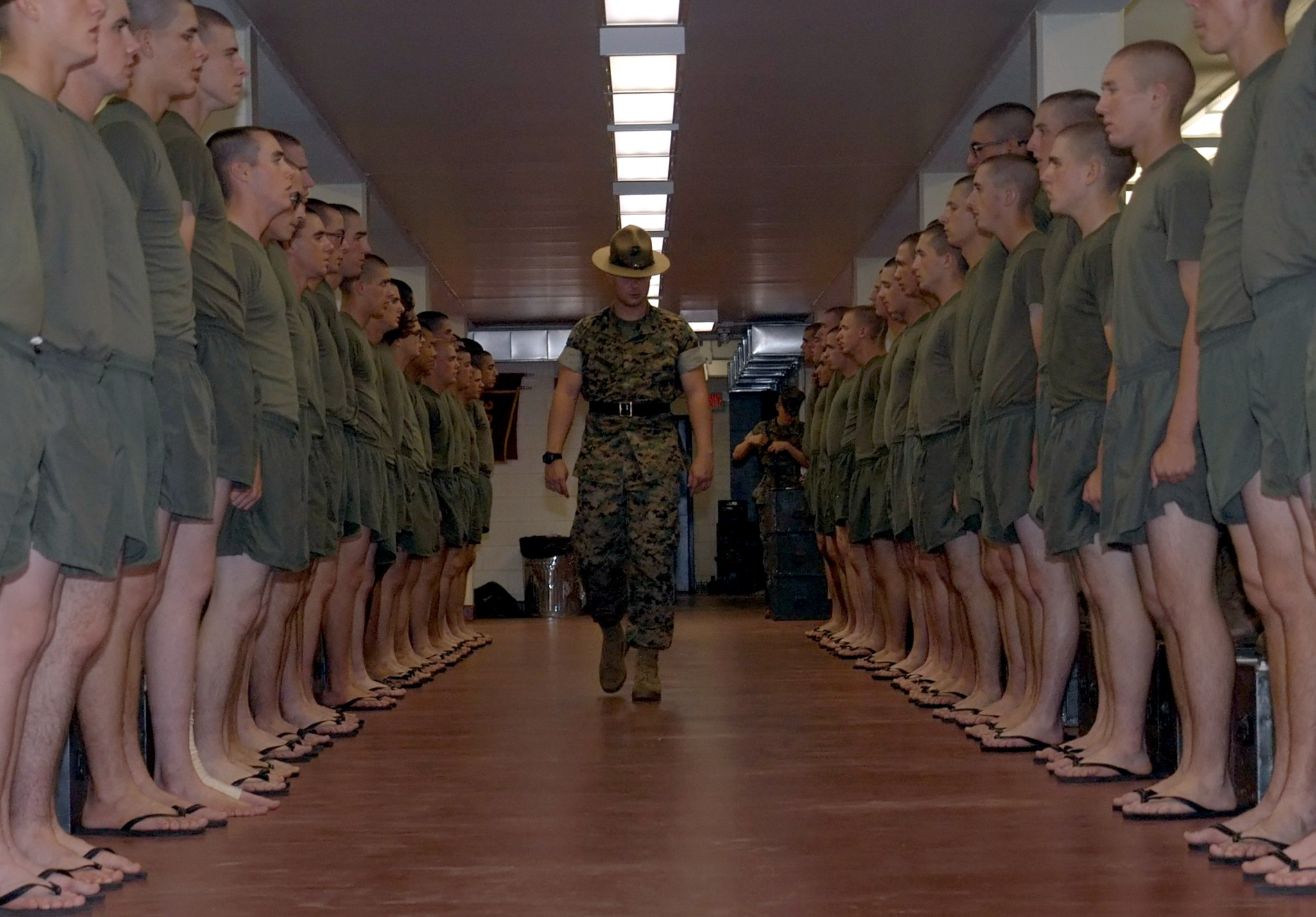
recruits wearing skivvies

- Skipper – Informal term of respect for a Marine captain (equivalent in rank to a Navy Lieutenant) who is in command of an infantry company, or for the commanding officer of a United States Navy ship or aviation squadron.
- Skivvies – Underwear: skivvie shirt (T-shirt) and skivvie drawers (underwear).
- Skuzz – To wash a deck or floor with a brush or towel (skuzz rag) in place of a mop, used in Boot Camp as a method to physically toughen recruits while cleaning the squadbay.
- Skuzzy – Sloppy or unkempt.
- Skylark – To casually frolic or take excess time to complete a task, from the old naval term to run up and down the rigging of a ship in sport.
- Slick sleeve – A private in the Marine Corps; refers to the fact that this person does not wear any rank insignia.
- Slide Bite/Beretta Bite – Pinching or abrasions of hand due to holding a semi-automatic pistol too closely to a recoiling slide.
- Slider – A hamburger so greasy that it slides right through the digestive tract of whoever eats it; typical of those served at flight line galleys.
- Slop chute – Impolite term for restaurant within the PX or beer garden. Enlisted Marine's club.
- SMAT – Supply maintenance assistance team, provide the commanding general with a technical supply inspection and assistance capability to improve control and management of all organic supply operations.
- SMEAC – Situation, Mission, Execution, Administration & Logistics, Commands & Signals. The acronym used for the five-paragraph order format.
- Smokey Bear or Smokey Brown – The campaign cover worn by a drill instructors, so named because of their similarity to the hat worn by Smokey Bear. See also campaign cover, field hat, & hat.
- Smokin' and Jokin' / Smoke and Joke – When a mass of Marines is acting unproductively.
- SNAFU – Situation Normal, All Fucked Up. or Situation Now All Fucked Up.
- SNCO – Staff Non-Commissioned Officer, Enlisted Marines of a rank having a pay grade of E-6 or higher: staff sergeant, gunnery sergeant, master sergeant, first sergeant, master gunnery sergeant and sergeant major.
- SNCOIC – staff non-commissioned officer in charge, a SNCO responsible for a group of marines, but without the authority of a commissioned officer; sometimes also the senior enlisted Marine acting with the officer in charge. See also NCOIC & OIC.
- Snap In – Conduct sighting in or aiming exercises with an unloaded weapon.
- SNM – Said Named Marine. Used in written communications to avoid having to repeatedly type the marine's rank and name after the first instance.
- SNO – Said Named Officer. Used in written communications to avoid having to repeatedly type the marine's rank and name after the first instance.
- Snow Job – Misleading or grossly exaggerated report; sales talk.
- Snuffie or Snuffy – Junior Marine, lance corporal and below.
- SOC or (SOC) – Special Operations Capable used in conjunction with MEU written as MEU (SOC).
- SOG Sgt. of the Guard – The acting Sgt (or near rank) Commanding the 'COG' Corporal of the Guard and all other marines for watch, radio watch, or post.
- Soup Cooler – Synonym for the mouth. Term oft used by DIs in reference to the mouth of a recruit, or by other senior person in reference to trainees.
- Soup Sandwich – Refers to a disorganized operation or a gaggle.
- South Maryland Small Boat & Barge Institute – Nickname for the United States Naval Academy at Annapolis, Maryland. See also Canoe U.
- SPAM (Special Army Meat) - Processed meat as field rations
- SOTG – Special Operations Training Group
- Spit and Polish – Extreme individual or collective military neatness, extreme devotion to the minutiae of traditional military procedures or ceremonies; from spit-polishing boots and dress shoes.
- Spit-Shine – polish leather footwear (boots and dress shoes), employing spittle to remove excess grease and produce a high polish.
- Splice the Mainbrace – Invitation to drink, from the old naval custom of drinking grog after repairing battle-damage to the main braces.
- Spud Locker – Place where fresh vegetables are stored, after the nickname for potatoes.
- Squadbay – Living quarters with open rooms and shared head, as opposed to the more common barracks that offer individual rooms.
- Square(d) Away – Make neat and regulation appearance, to be in a neat and regulation appearance.
- Squid – Pejorative for sailor.
- SRB – Service Record Book, an administrative record of an enlisted Marine's personal information, promotions, postings, deployments, punishments, and emergency data; much like an officer's OQR.
- SSDD – Same Shit, Different Day, euphemism denoting frustration with an unchanging situation or boredom.
- Stacking Swivel – Oblong-shaped link with an opening screwed to the rifle that allowed other rifles to be hooked and stacked (the M1 Garand was the last service rifle to have a stacking swivel, this function is now held by the weapon's sling); "Grab him by the stacking swivel" infers grabbing a person's throat.
- Staff NCO – staff non-commissioned officer, enlisted marines of a rank having a pay grade of E-6 or higher: staff sergeant, gunnery sergeant, master sergeant, first sergeant, master gunnery sergeant and sergeant major.
- Stage – To pre-position something.
- Stand By – Command to wait. Also stand by to stand by - hurry up and wait. The wait before the wait.
- Starboard – Naval term for "right side of ship" when on board a ship and facing forward; opposite of port. "Starboard" is the same with respect to a ship regardless of where a person is located or which way a person is facing, whereas "right" might be ambiguous.
- STEAL – Stealthily Transport Equipment to Another Location.
- Steel Pot – the M1 combat helmet, in service from 1941 to 1987.
- Stick – Squad of servicemembers being transported either via aircraft or ground vehicle. (Term "Chalk" is used by Army to reference platoon plus size unit.)
- Stocking Feet – The state of wearing socks, but no shoes or boots.
- STOL – Short TakeOff/Landing, takeoff and landing technique needing only a short runway to become airborne. See also STOVL, VTOL, & V/STOL.
- STOVL – Short TakeOff, Vertical Landing, takeoff and landing technique where a V/STOL aircraft will make a non-vertical take-off to carry greater weight, such as fuel and weapons, expend that weight, and make a vertical landing. See also STOL, VTOL, and V/STOL.
- STRAP-EX- System Technical Readiness and Programming Exercise.
- Suck – Mouth.
- The Suck – Miserable situation or place, often refers to the Marine Corps or a combat zone.
- Survey – Medical discharge or to effect discharge/retirement of an individual for medical reasons; dispose of an item of government property by reason of unserviceability.
- Swab – Mop; also pejorative for sailor, so named because sailors of wooden ships had to swab the decks to keep them from warping.
- Swamp-ass – Unpleasant collection of sweat-soaked undergarments.
- Swinging Dick – Vulgarity for male Marine, usually used as "every swinging dick" to emphasize an order to a whole group instead of individual(s).
- Swoop – Make a long trip in a short period of time, usually in reference to returning to post after liberty to avoid an UA status.
- Sympathy Chit – Voucher sarcastically authorizing the recipient sympathy from others.

== T ==
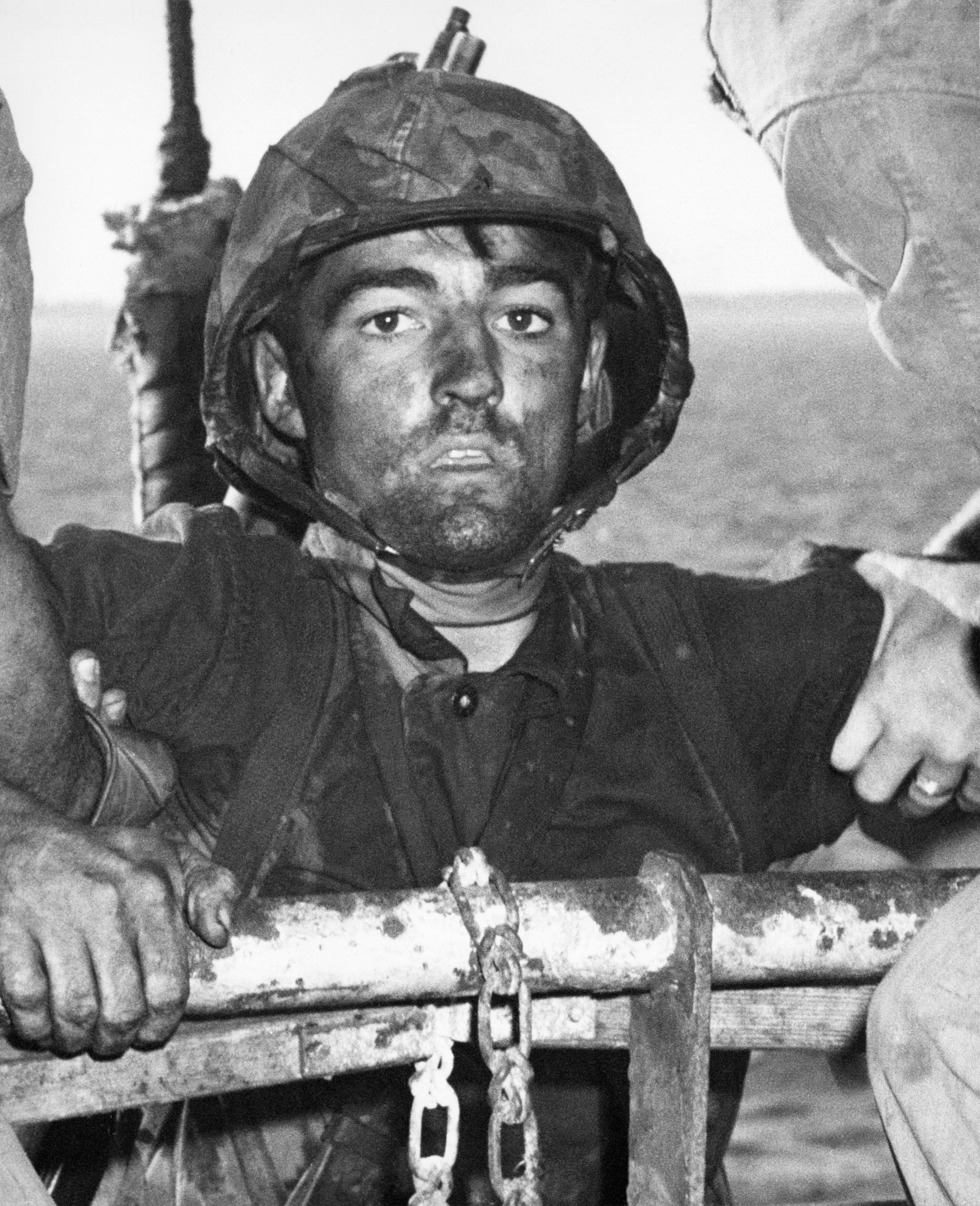
Thousand-yard stare

- Taco Rice – A popular dish invented and served on Okinawa, consisting of various taco fillings served on a bed of rice. Every servicemember who has ever been stationed on Okinawa has a favorite taco rice stand which they swear is the best on the island.
- Tactically Acquire – Euphemism for stealing something.
- TAD – Temporary Assigned Duty, a duty where the Marine or Sailor is detached from their unit temporarily and serves elsewhere; comparable to the Army term TDY.
- TBS – The Basic School, the six-month combat training school for new Marine officers.
- Terminal lance – Marine nearing the end of his enlistment at the rank of lance corporal and unlikely to get promoted; also a webcomic of the same name. Also referred to as lance colonel.
- Terp – An interpreter.
- The Rock – Okinawa.
- Thousand-yard stare – unfocused gaze of a battle-weary servicemember.
- Thump Gun – grenade launcher, from the distinctive noise made when firing. See also blooper.
- TIC – Troops In Contact
- Tie-ties – Straps or strings used to tie items to another line, such as laundry or rifle targets.
- Tiffany Cuff Links - The most strenuous effort exerted at tasks, reference to link holding shirt sleeve cuffs of formal parading uniforms.
- Tight-jawed – Angry, so named from the human tendency to clench the jaw when angered.
- Tip of the Spear – Term for a unit or subunit that enters enemy territory first.
- T/O&E – Table of Organization and Equipment as defined by MCO 5311.1E Total Force Structure Process, is a list authorizing a unit the personnel of a particular rank and MOS, as well as organic equipment required to accomplish the unit's assigned Mission Essential Tasks; often presented separately as T/O and T/E.
- Top – informal nickname for a master sergeant or master gunnery sergeant, inappropriate to use without permission.
- Topside – Ship's upper deck.
- Tore up – Broken, messy, unserviceable.
- Trade-school – Refers to graduate of one of the Military Academies.
- TRAM – Tractor, Rubber-tired, Articulated steering, Multi-purpose.
- T-Rats – Tray ration, nickname for Unitized Group Ration, a ration heated and served to a group of servicemembers.
- Trooper – Soldier, considered a grievous insult to refer to a Marine unless plural.
- TS Chit – A "Tough Shit" Chit is a (fictitious) small card, to be punched by a senior person upon hearing a high-grade TS (very sad) story. When completely punched around the edge, the bearer is entitled to a half hour with the chaplain. "That story is so sad I'll punch your TS Chit twice."
- Turtle – Metal clip backing for collar rank insignia.
- Two-block – Hoist a flag or pennant to the peak, truck, or yardarm of a staff; or a tie with the knot positioned exactly in the gap of a collar of a buttoned shirt. Correctly, "to-block" – hoisted all the way to the block (pulley) at the top of signal halliard.
- Two-digit Midget – An enlisted Marine with 99 or fewer days remaining on their enlistment or tour of duty. A variation is the single-digit midget, with nine or fewer days remaining.

== U ==
- UA – Unauthorized Absence, the naval version of the term AWOL.
- UCMJ – Uniform Code of Military Justice (Public Law 506, 81st Congress) 1951, the system of military law, both judicial and non-judicial.
- UD – Unit Diary, the computerized system that maintains all administrative records for a unit. Also, Uniform of the Day (or UDs) – prescribed uniform for the day; more generally associated with 'Charlies'
- Un-fuck – To correct a deficiency, usually on a person.
- Under Arms – Status of carrying a weapon (rifle, sidearm, sword); wearing an "MP" or "SP" brassard; or wearing weapon-related equipment such as a sword sling, pistol belt, or cartridge belt as part of guard duty. Marines under arms do not remove covers indoors except under special circumstances, such as when entering a place of worship.
- Under Canvas – Living under temporary sheltering, such as a tent.

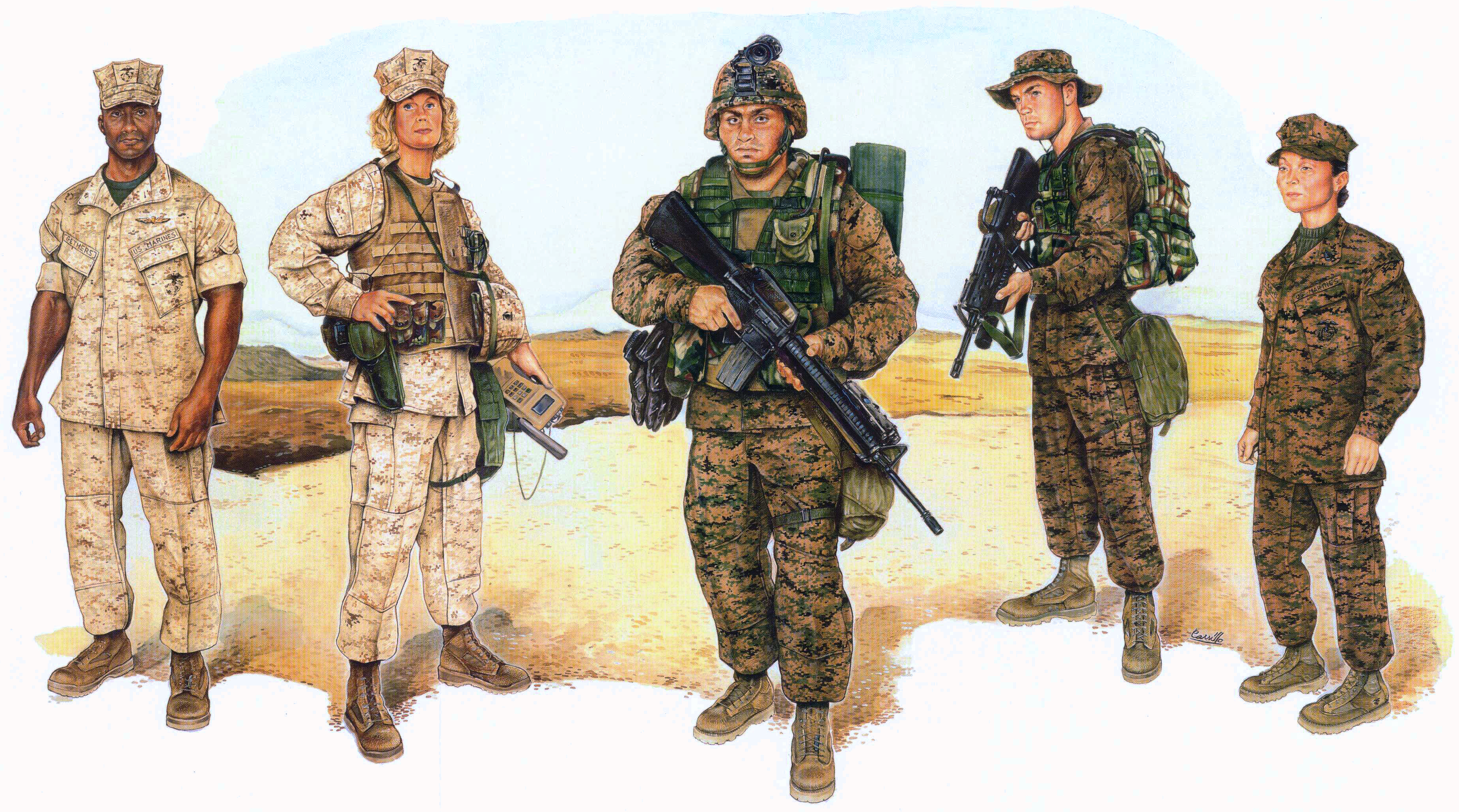
utilities

- Under Way – To depart or to start a process for an objective.
- UNQ – Unqualified, usually in reference to training events. Pronounced "unk."
- Unsat – Abbreviation of unsatisfactory.
- USMC – Acronym for United States Marine Corps. Also used as a pejorative backronym: Uncle Sam's Misguided Children, U Signed the Motherfucking Contract, U Suckers Missed Christmas, Unlimited Shit and Mass Confusion, University of Science, Music and Culture, Uncomplicated Shit Made Complicated, Under Seabee Management Constantly.
- Utilities – field and work uniforms (currently the MCCUU), formerly called dungarees, inappropriately called the Army term BDU.
- UVA – Uniformed Victim's Advocate – older, more experienced, male and female Marines who have received specialized training to confidentially assist uniformed victims of sexual assault, both male and female, to receive proper medical attention and access to all the necessary resources.

== V ==
- VERTREP – vertical replenishment, the use of helicopters for cargo transfer to ships or distant outposts.
- VEERP – Voluntary Enlisted Early Release Program, getting out of the Marine Corps early
- Voluntold – Being volunteered for a task without having a choice by a superior.
- VTOL – Vertical TakeOff/Landing, takeoff and landing technique that does not need a runway to become airborne. See also STOL, STOVL, & V/STOL.
- V/R – Very Respectfully, used as an end greeting in written naval communication to senior.
- V/STOL – Vertical/Short Takeoff and Landing, a type of aircraft that can perform STOL, STOVL, and VTOL.

== W ==
- Walking John – Nickname for a Marine marching in dress blues uniform that appeared on World War I-era recruiting posters.
- War Belt – A web belt used to carry canteens in pouches and other miscellaneous equipment.
- War Paint – Camouflage face paint.
- Watch – Formal tour of duty of prescribed length, usually a guard-related task.
- Watch Your Six – Look out for potential threats, especially any that may approach from behind (the "six o'clock" position).
- Water Bowl – Synonym for a canteen (1990s era).
- Water Buffalo or Water Bull – 400-gallon potable water tank, trailer-mounted, towed behind a truck.
- Water Walker - An exceptionally high-performing Marine with great potential.
- Wetting-down or Wet Down – Celebration in honor of one's promotion as an officer or to the SNCO ranks, so named for the tradition of wetting the recipient or the promotion warrant.
- Whiskey Locker – Supply locker/closet. The person responsible for looking after it may be referred to as a "Whiskey Pig."
- WP or Willie Pete[r] – White Phosphorus munition, whether in grenade, mortar, artillery, or aerial bomb form, so named from the pre-1956 phonetic alphabet letters "William" and "Peter."
- Wilco – Voice procedure term shortened from "Will Comply".
- Willie Pete Bag – Waterproof bag.
- Wing Wiper – Aviation person, usually a maintenance person and not a pilot.
- Winger – Aviation Marine.
- WIR – DRMO; Washed-out In Repair; waste incidental to reprocessing; collection of items or equipment for turn-in that may be re-used by someone else at a later time, preferably at a savings to the government.
- The Wire – Defensive perimeter of a firm base, crossing it denotes the end of relative safety.
- Wook – A female Marine.
- Wooly Pully – Green wool sweater worn with the service uniform (or blue with the dress uniform) over the khaki shirt.
- Word – General term for instructions, orders, and information that is required for all members of a unit to know; or the act of passing information to a collected group of servicemembers. See also gouge.
- WM – Unofficial acronym that stands for a Woman Marine. Generally considered to be pejorative.
- Work Your Bolt – resort to special measures, either by energy or guile, in order to attain a particular end; from the action of racking a rifle's bolt to clear a stoppage.

== Y ==
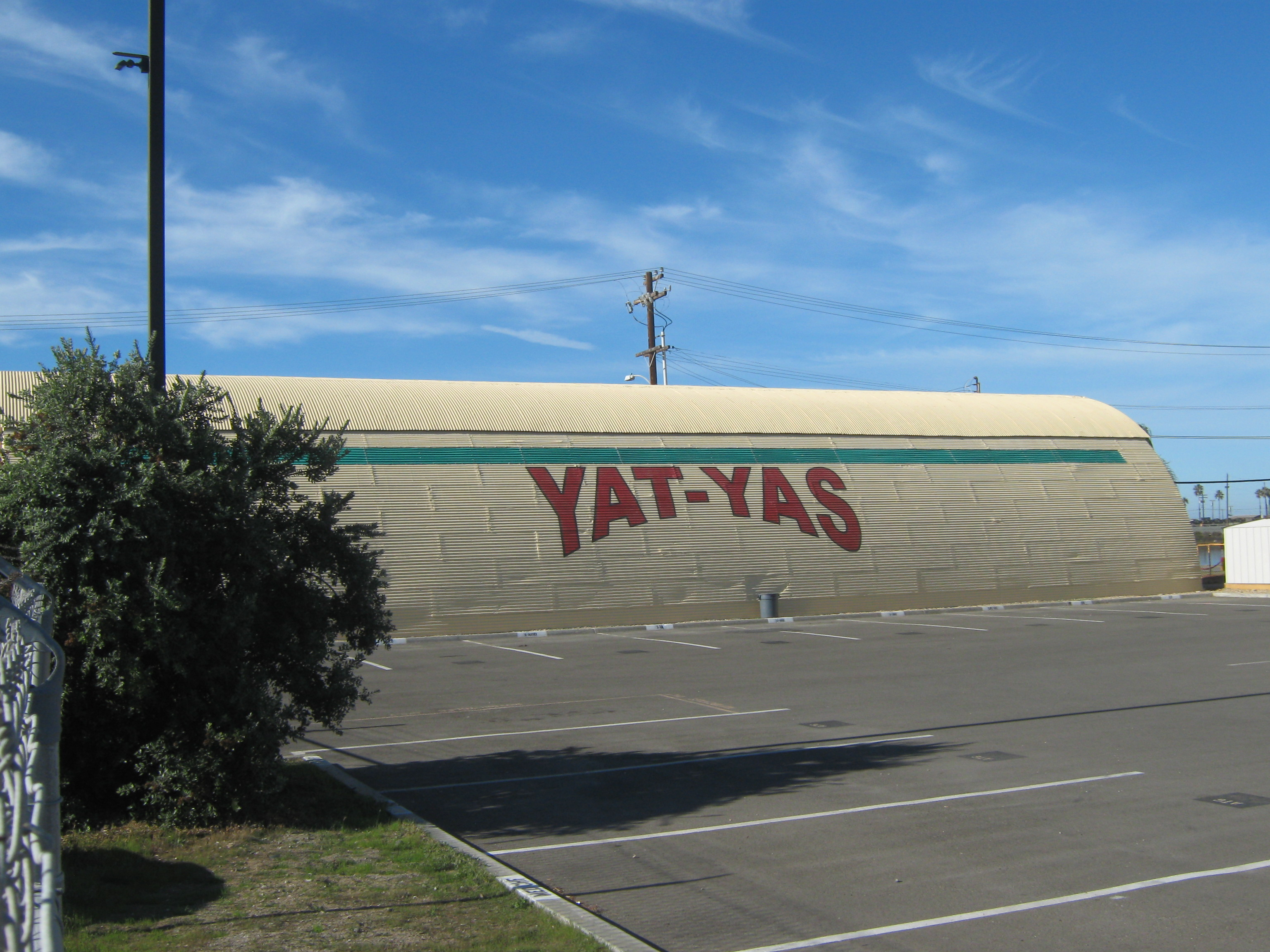
YAT-YAS on the tracks museum

- YATYAS or YAT YAS – "You ain't tracks, You ain't shit", an amtrac slogan or term for AAV Marines.
- Yellow leg – Marine, nickname given by North Korean Army in reference to Korean War-era discolored, yellow-looking leggings.
- You-who – When an NCO or Higher wants the attention of a Junior/Boot and does not know his name
- Yut or Yut Yut – Stands for "Yelling Unnecessarily Things." A motivational saying similar to Oorah.

== Z ==
- Zero – Pronounced zee-ROW in an exaggerated manner, as used by Drill Instructors at the end of a count-down implying that recruits are to immediately cease all activity and remain silently in place. Used by Marines to gain the immediate attention of all personnel in the area without calling attention on deck.
- Zero – Disparaging term used amongst enlisted personnel when referring to officers. Derived from the "o" in officer.
- Zero-dark thirty – Very early hours before dawn. See also military time, O-dark thirty.
- Zero-stupid thirty – An unnecessarily early time for which personnel are required to assemble for an activity. See also Zero-dark thirty, O-dark thirty.
- Zoomie – pilot, usually an Air Force pilot.
- Zoomie U – United States Air Force Academy

== See also ==
- List of U.S. Navy acronyms
- List of U.S. Air Force acronyms and expressions
- List of U.S. government and military acronyms
- Glossary of military abbreviations
- Brevity codes used by aviators
- Glossary of nautical terms (disambiguation)
