= United States Marine Corps Color Guard =

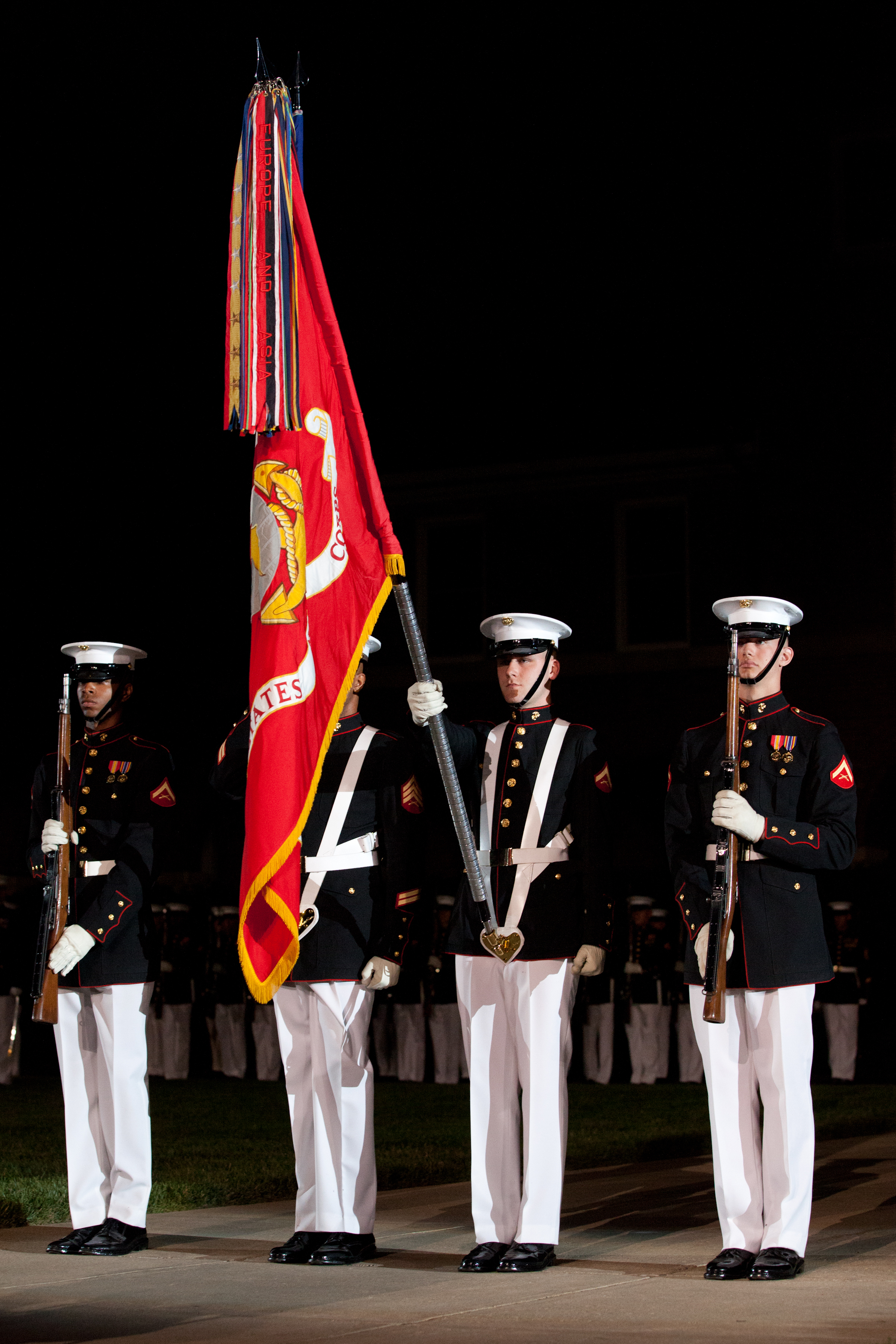
- Members of the USMC Color Guard display the colors during the Friday Evening Parade.
- Country: United States
- Branch: USMC
- Type: Color Guard
- Size: 4
- Part of: Color Guard Platoon, Ceremonial Company A
- Garrison/HQ: Marine Barracks Washington
- Nicknames: "The Commandant's Four" "Parade Four"

Commanders
- Color Sergeant of the Marine Corps: Sergeant Daniel Vazquez Colon

The United States Marine Corps Color Guard "The Commandant's Four" is the official color guard of the United States Marine Corps. The guard is responsible for serving as the official representative of the Commandant of the Marine Corps in all Marine ceremonies where the national colors as well as the Battle Color of the Marine Corps are needed. The guard, along with the United States Marine Drum and Bugle Corps and the United States Marine Corps Silent Drill Platoon, makes up the Marine Corps Battle Colors Detachment.

== Duties ==
The four, along with three other squads, make up the Marine Corps Color Guard Platoon, which platoon renders military honors at ceremonies in the National Capital Region and across the United States and forms a Joint Color Guard for ceremonies at The White House and The Pentagon. Members of the color guard are personally selected by the Commanding Officer of Marine Barracks Washington. The Color Sergeant of the Marine Corps heads the unit and is the Non-Commissioned Officer in Charge.

== See also ==
- United States military bands
