= Color Sergeant of the Marine Corps =

Billet in the United States Marine Corps

- Incumbent; Sgt. Jean Pierre St. Surin since October 2025
- Style: Color Sergeant/Rank
- Member of: United States Marine Corps Color Guard Platoon
- Term length: 2 years straight, nonrenewable
- Formation: Friday, January 1, 1965
- First holder: Gunnery Sgt. Shelton L. Eakin

The Color Sergeant of the Marine Corps billet was created in 1965 in the United States Marine Corps held by a non-commissioned officer posted at Marine Barracks Washington. He is responsible for carrying the official Colors of The United States Marine Corps while leading "The Commandant's Four", members of which are part of the United States Marine Corps Color Guard Platoon. The post of Color Sergeant of the Marine Corps was first launched since January 1, 1965 and first held by Shelton L. Eakin, who was killed in action the following year during the Vietnam War.

== Duties ==
The Color Sergeant of the Marine Corps is considered the senior-most sergeant in the U.S. Marine Corps and serves as the Non-Commissioned Officer in Charge of "Parade Four", the U.S. Marine Corps' principal color guard. During state events, he is responsible for carrying the flag of the president of the United States. The Color Sergeant of the Marine Corps is also expected to serve as an example of correct appearance to all Marines.

== Qualifications ==
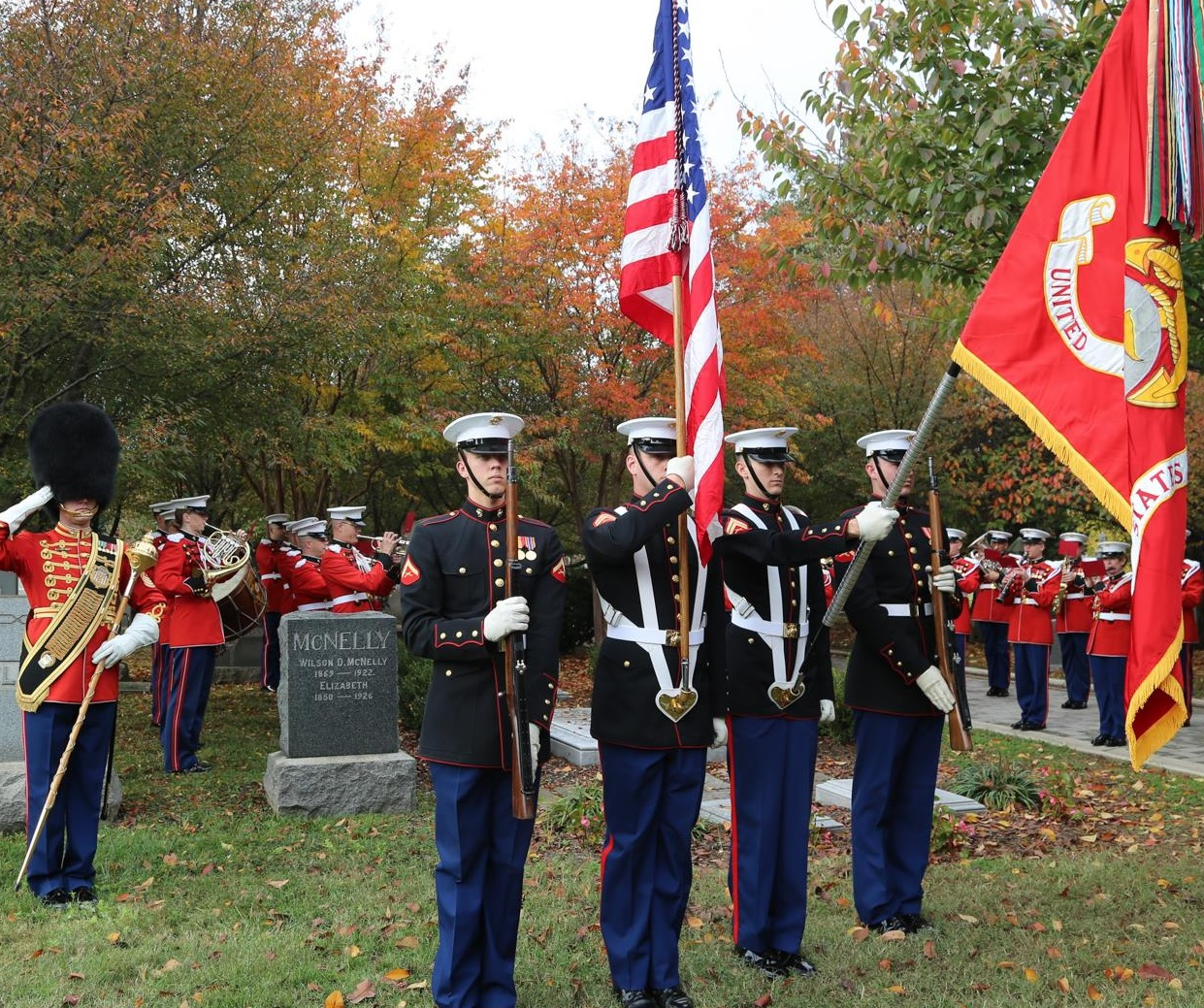
Kenneth Newton, 37th Color Sergeant of the Marine Corps, is pictured holding the national ensign of the United States during annual memorial observances at the tomb of John Philip Sousa in 2017

The Color Sergeant of the Marine Corps is appointed by the commanding officer of Marine Barracks Washington and applicants from throughout the Marine Corps are considered. He must be a sergeant between 6-foot 2-inches and 6-foot 6-inches in height, meet Marine Corps weight standards, and be eligible for clearance to the Top Secret Sensitive Compartmented Information level. The appointment to Color Sergeant of the Marine Corps is for a two-year, non-renewable term.

== List of Color Sergeants ==
| No. | Image | Name | Term start | Term end |
|---|---|---|---|---|
| 1st Year | | Gunnery Sgt. Shelton L. Eakin | January 1965 | December 1965 |
| 2nd | | Staff Sgt. J.D. Coco | January 1966 | August 1966 |
| 3rd | | Sgt. L.C. Pittman | September 1966 | January 1967 |
| 4th | | Sgt. R.E. Brothers | February 1967 | June 1967 |
| 5th | | Sgt. M.T. Kane | July 1967 | December 1967 |
| 6th | | Sgt. W.J. Monahan | January 1968 | June 1968 |
| 7th | | Sgt. J.C. McCord | July 1968 | September 1968 |
| 8th | | Cpl. E.W. Williams | October 1968 | February 1969 |
| 9th | | Cpl. C.A. Kern | March 1969 | June 1969 |
| 10th | | Sgt. D.G. Thorpe | July 1969 | December 1969 |
| 11th | | Sgt. T.A. Strasberg | January 1970 | December 1970 |
| 12th | | Sgt. Tim W. Hughes | January 1971 | December 1972 |
| 13th | | Sgt. J.E. Brown | January 1973 | December 1974 |
| 14th | | Sgt. L.M. Baade | January 1975 | September 1976 |
| 15th | | Sgt. E.A. Chavez | October 1976 | December 1978 |
| 16th | | Sgt. J.W. Walters | January 1979 | December 1980 |
| 17th | | Sgt. M.J. Watkins | January 1981 | December 1982 |
| 18th | | Sgt. P.L. Peironello | January 1983 | December 1983 |
| 19th | | Sgt. J.E. Capua | January 1984 | December 1985 |
| 20th | | Sgt. T.H. McMahon | January 1986 | December 1987 |
| 21st | | Sgt. D.R. Boyd | January 1988 | September 1989 |
| 22nd | | Sgt. Dean R. Keck | October 1989 | April 1993 |
| 23rd | | Sgt. Daniel J. Charlier | April 1993 | January 1995 |
| 24th | | Sgt. Thomas W. Rollinson | January 1995 | June 1996 |
| 25th | | Sgt. R.R. Robinson | June 1996 | May 1997 |
| 26th | | Sgt. Heath F. Kuhlmann | May 1997 | August 1998 |
| 27th | | Sgt. James D. Reed | August 1998 | December 1999 |
| 28th (2000s) | | Sgt. Blake L. Richardson | January 2000 | August 2001 |
| 29th | | Sgt. Trevor H. Johnson | August 2001 | December 2003 |
| 30th | | Sgt. Brian T. Strickland | December 2003 | November 2005 |
| 31st | | Sgt. Andrel C. Rutherford | November 2005 | December 2006 |
| 32nd | | Sgt. Scott A. Jewel | January 2007 | August 2008 |
| 33rd | | Sgt. Corey R. Wünderlich | August 2008 | December 2009 |
| 34th (2010s) | | Sgt. Eric A. Humor | January 2010 | October 2011 |
| 35th | | Sgt. Timothy A. Spreder | November 2011 | September 2013 |
| 36th | | Sgt. Allen J. Banks Jr. | October 2013 | January 2016 |
| 37th | | Sgt. Kenneth J. Newton | February 2016 | December 2017 |
| 38th | | Sgt. Francis S. Frazier | January 2018 | December 2019 |
| 39th (COVID-19) | The 38th and 39th Color Sergeant of the Marine Corps Relief and Appointment Ceremony | Sgt. Franklin D. Taft | January 2020 | June 2021 |
| 40th | | Sgt. Cameron L. Williams | May 2021 | June 2023 |
| 41st | | Sgt. Steve A. Sexton | April 2023 | April 2025 |
| 42nd | | Sgt. Daniel Vazquez-Colon | April 2025 | October 2025 |
| 43rd | | Sgt. Jean Pierre St. Surin | October 2025 | present |

== See also ==
- Colour sergeant
