= Friday Evening Parade =

Weekly military parade in Washington DC

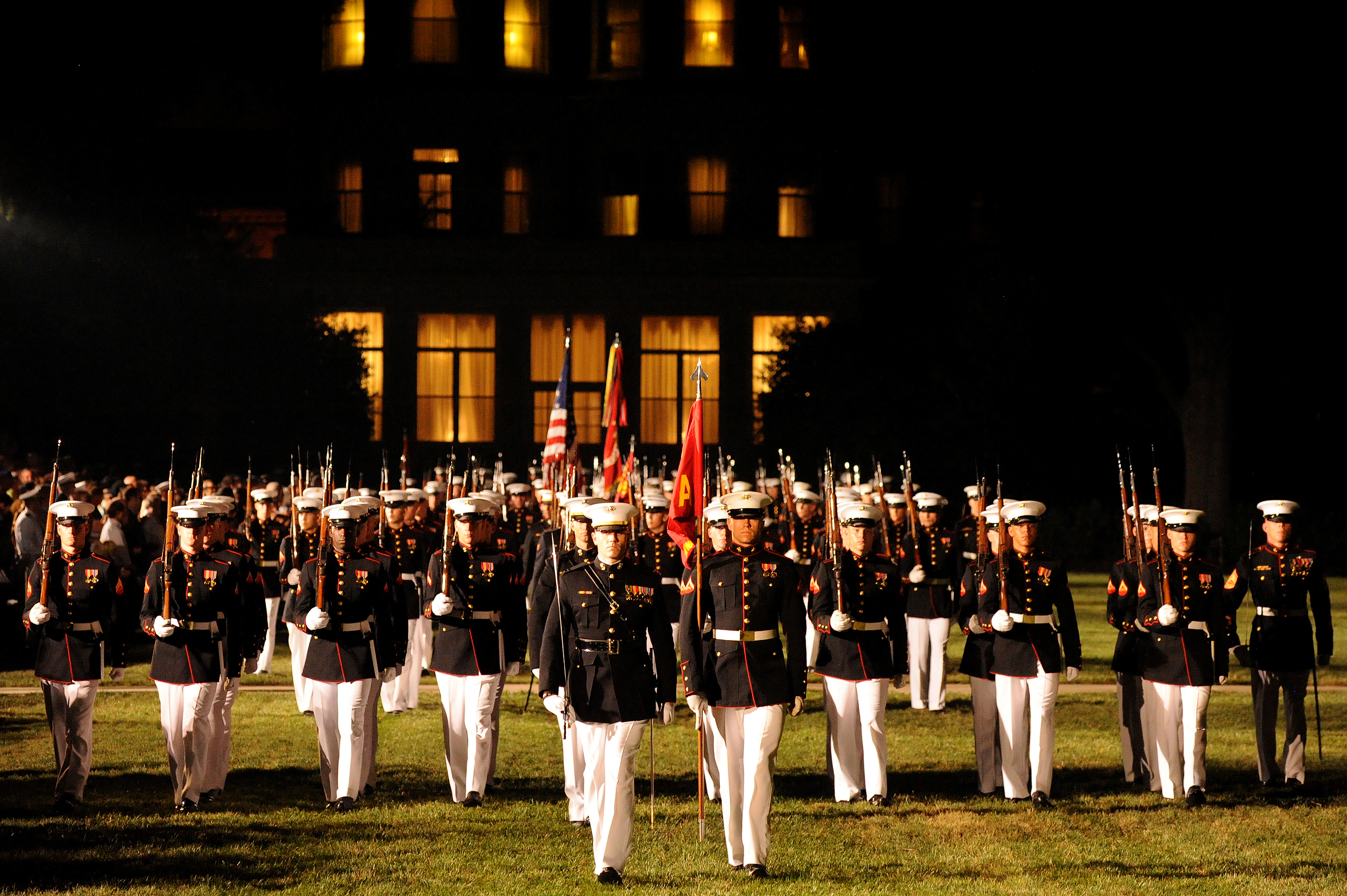
- Status: Active
- Frequency: Weekly during summer
- Locations: Washington, D.C., United States
- Most recent: 22 August 2025
- Next event: To be announced
- Website: www.barracks.marines.mil/Parades/Evening-Parade/

The Friday Evening Parade is a public duty performed by the United States Marine Corps at Marine Barracks Washington. It is executed on Friday evenings during the summer months. The parade's drill is loosely based on the Landing Party Manual.

== History ==
The "President's Own" U.S. Marine Band leads the pass in review during a Friday Evening Parade

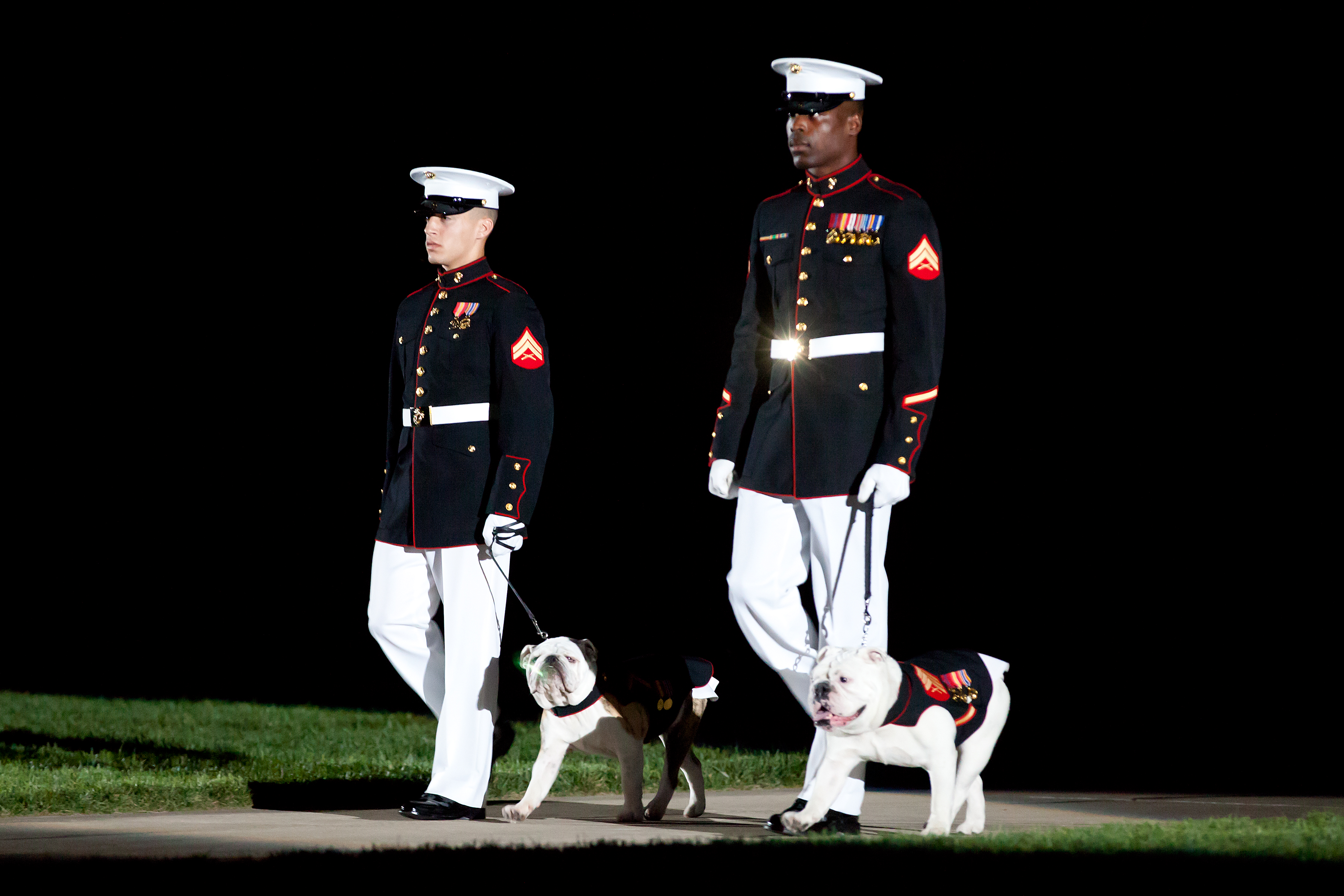
Marine mascots Chesty XIII and Chesty XIV arrive on the 8th and I parade deck during a 2013 Friday Evening Parade

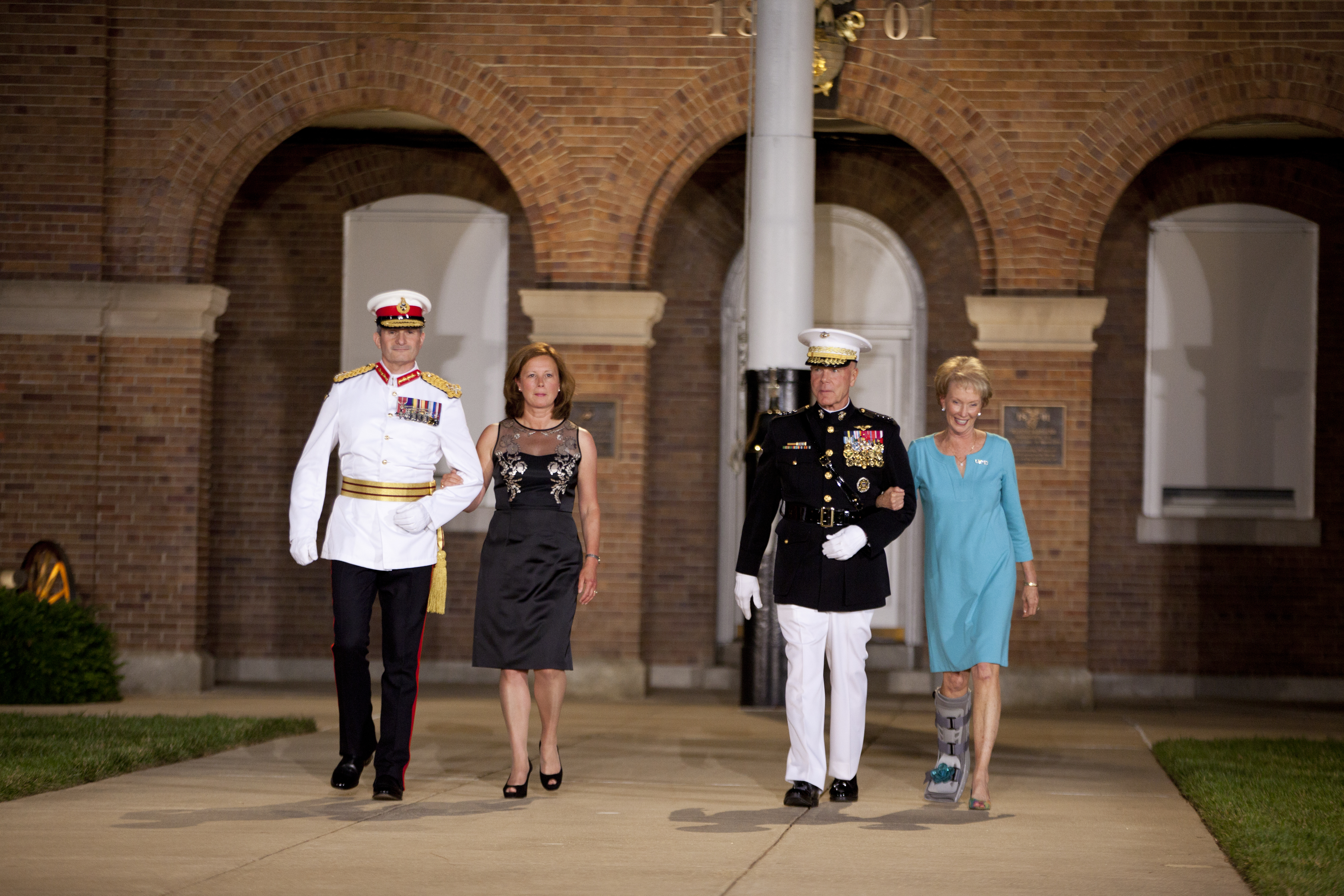
The Commandant of the Corps of Royal Marines and the Commandant of the United States Marine Corps arrive on the parade deck with their spouses prior to a 2014 Friday Evening Parade

=== 8th and I parade deck ===
Marine Barracks Washington ("8th and I") was constructed in 1801 as the headquarters of the U.S. Marine Corps. Among its original features was a grass parade deck near the site where the residence of the Commandant of the Marine Corps would be constructed five years later.

On the eve of the fall of Washington, D.C. during the War of 1812, two Marines from the barracks were assigned to guard the corps' payroll, a chest of gold coins. As fighting in and around the city became increasingly desperate, the sentries buried the payroll and left the barracks to join the defense of the capital. British intelligence learned of the payroll's burial and, when the barracks fell to the British Army, soldiers razed the parade deck in an attempt to locate it. (Note: Both of the Marine sentries were subsequently killed in action and the payroll was never recovered.) Following the end of hostilities, the parade deck was restored and resumed its use as a drill field for marines in training; according to Gen. John Admire, due to the defilement of the grounds in 1814 Marines have since "felt a certain sanctity toward the parade deck that borders on religious zeal".

=== Start of public parades ===
In 1911, U.S. Marine Corps recruit training moved out of the 8th and I barracks and the remnant garrison posted there shifted its focus to ceremonial duties. By 1934, under the direction of Major Lemuel Shepherd, a weekly, afternoon parade based on the drill of the Landing Party Manual (Note: The Landing Party Manual is a deprecated tactical manual that "contains instructions for Naval landing parties and emergency ground defense force units".) was organized for members of the public during the summer months. A joint, evening drill with the Corps of Royal Marines in 1956 at the Bermuda Searchlight Tattoo convinced Marine officers that moving the afternoon parade to the evening hours – and performing it under spotlights – would provide a more dramatic effect. The change was implemented that year resulting in the creation of the Friday Evening Parade. What was the afternoon parade became the Sunset Parade.

=== Evolution of parade ===
Among early critiques of the Friday Evening Parade was that the barracks lacked salute artillery. In October 1957, Prince Philip – during the state visit of the United Kingdom to the United States – inspected the garrison. Before the visit, guns were procured from Norfolk Navy Yard and temporarily installed near the parade deck to fire a cannonade for Philip's arrival. This marked the first time a 21 gun salute had been fired at the barracks in its history. The guns were retained for use at the Friday Evening Parades and, in 1958, a permanent battery was installed near the parade deck, first fired that year for the visit of Constantine II of Greece.

Though Marine Barracks Washington is only three miles away from the White House, it was not until July 12, 1962, that President of the United States John F. Kennedy became the first American president to visit the barracks since Thomas Jefferson selected the site in 1801. Kennedy viewed the Friday Evening Parade, the resulting press coverage increasing its popularity among Washington residents and tourists. During the presidency of John F. Kennedy the parade was once performed on the White House South Lawn and, during the presidency of Jimmy Carter, at Camp David during the Camp David Accords.

In 2012 Major Sarah Armstrong became the first female Marine to command the Friday Evening Parade in its history.

== Organization ==
=== Order of ceremony ===
As of 2018, the Friday Evening Parade, which lasts approximately one hour, occurs at 8:45 p.m. on Friday evenings in June, July, and August.

=== Units and personnel ===
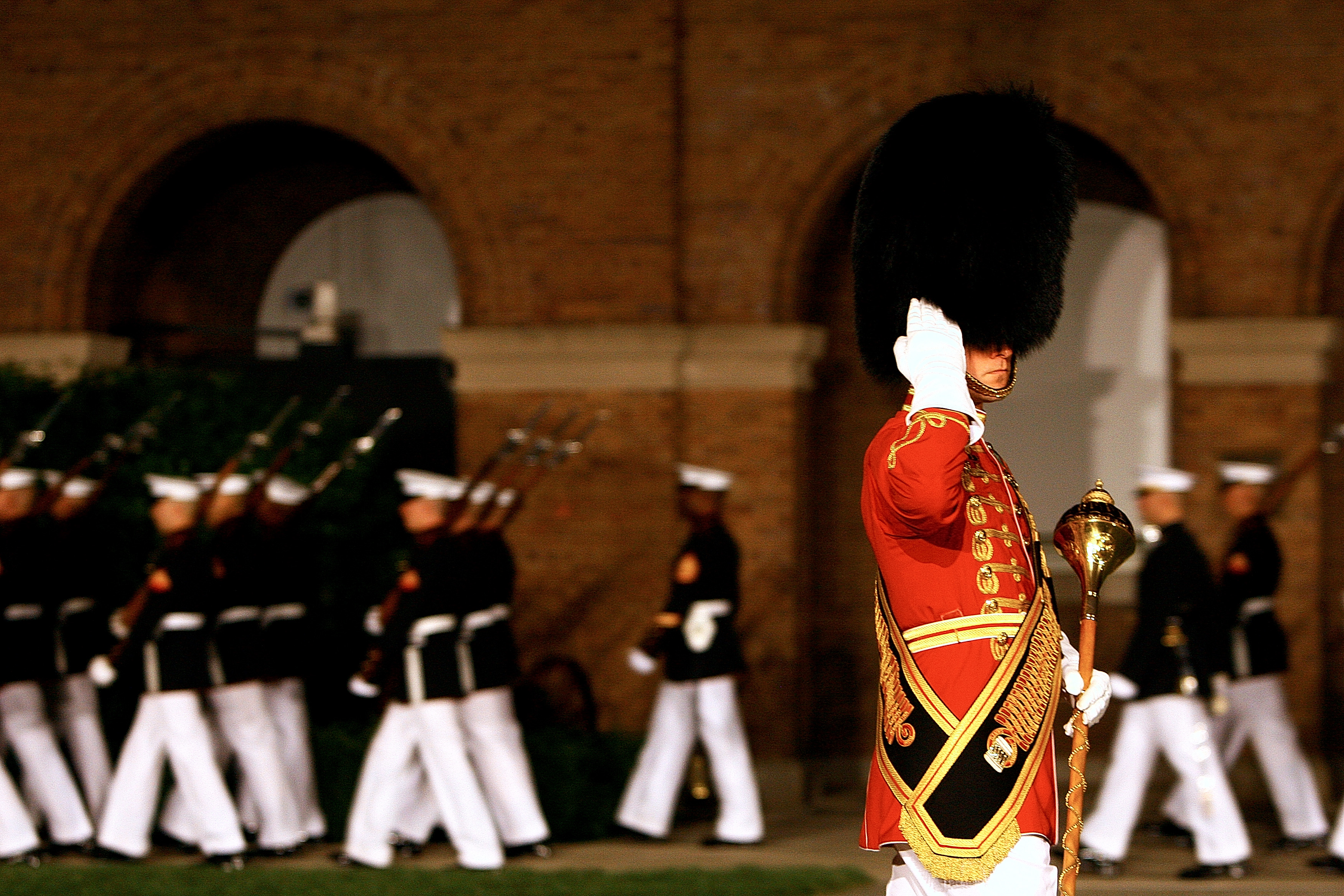
Gunnery Sergeant Duane King of the United States Marine Band salutes during the Friday Evening Parade in June 2018.

Participating units include "The President's Own" United States Marine Band, "The Commandant's Own" United States Marine Drum and Bugle Corps, the U.S. Marine Corps Silent Drill Platoon, the U.S. Marine Corps Color Guard, Alpha Company of the 8th and I garrison, Bravo Company of the 8th and I garrison, Marine Corps mascot Chesty XVI, and the Marine Barracks Washington salute artillery. Most Friday Evening Parades have a guest of honor.

== See also ==
- Beating Retreat
