= Sunset Parade =

Military ceremony in Washington DC

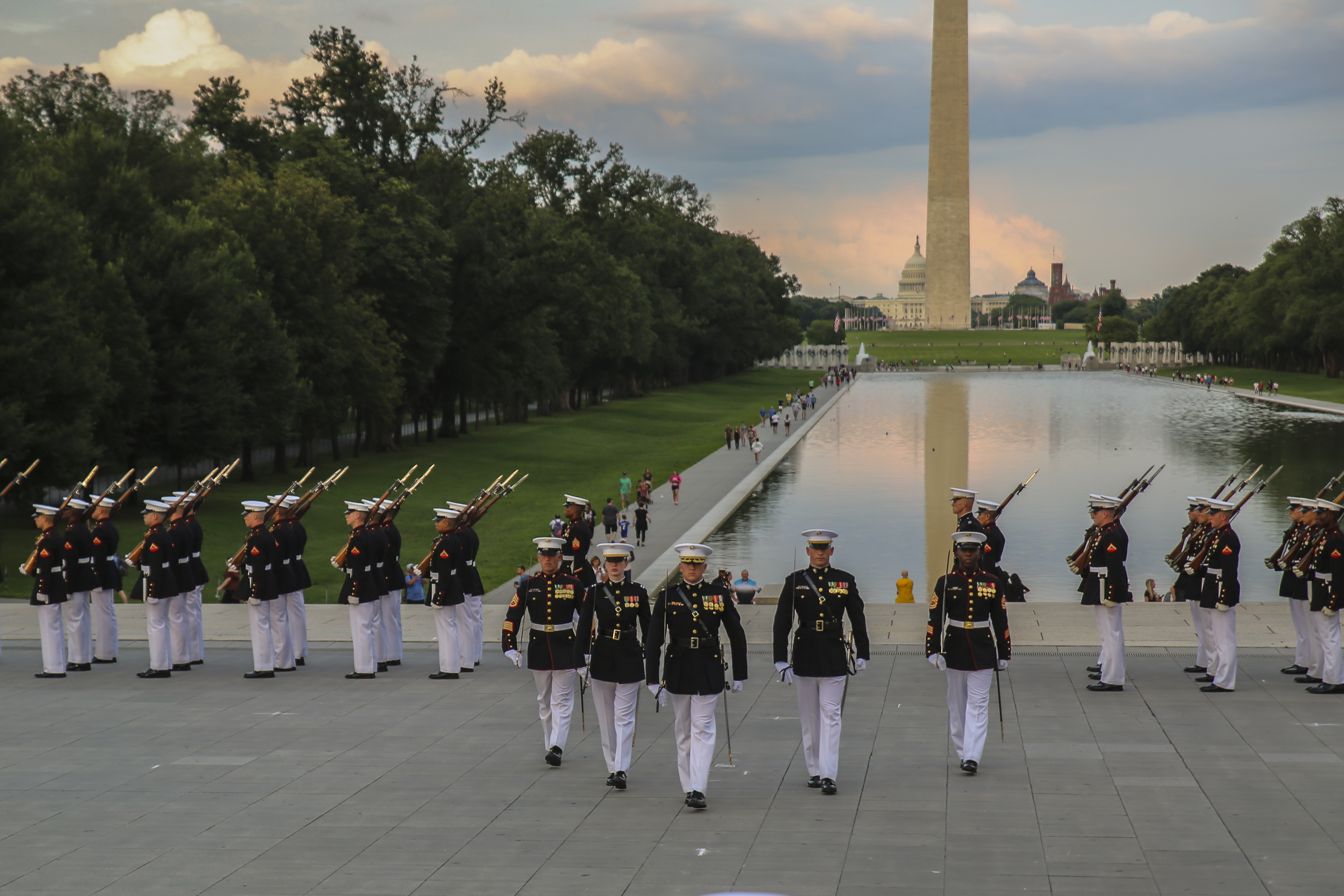
- Status: Active
- Frequency: Weekly during summer
- Locations: Washington, D.C., United States
- Most recent: August 5, 2025
- Next event: To be announced
- Website: www.barracks.marines.mil/Parades/Sunset-Parade

The Sunset Parade is a military parade performed by the United States Marine Corps at the Lincoln Memorial on the National Mall in Washington, D.C. It is very loosely based on the Landing Party Manual (Note: The Landing Party Manual is a deprecated tactical manual that "contains instructions for Naval landing parties and emergency ground defense force units".) and is executed on Tuesday evenings in the summer, involving approximately 200 personnel drawn from the garrison of Marine Barracks Washington.

== History ==
In 1911, Marine Corps recruit training moved out of Marine Barracks Washington ("8th and I"), and the remnant garrison posted there turned its attention to ceremonial duties. Major Lemuel Shepherd organized a weekly afternoon parade during the summer months in 1934 based on the drill of the Landing Party Manual. The Marine Corps performed a pass in review for President Dwight Eisenhower during dedication ceremonies of the Marine Corps War Memorial in 1954. The following year, guard mounting at the memorial became a weekly occurrence, held at 4:30 p.m.

A portion of a 2018 Sunset Parade at the Lincoln Memorial.

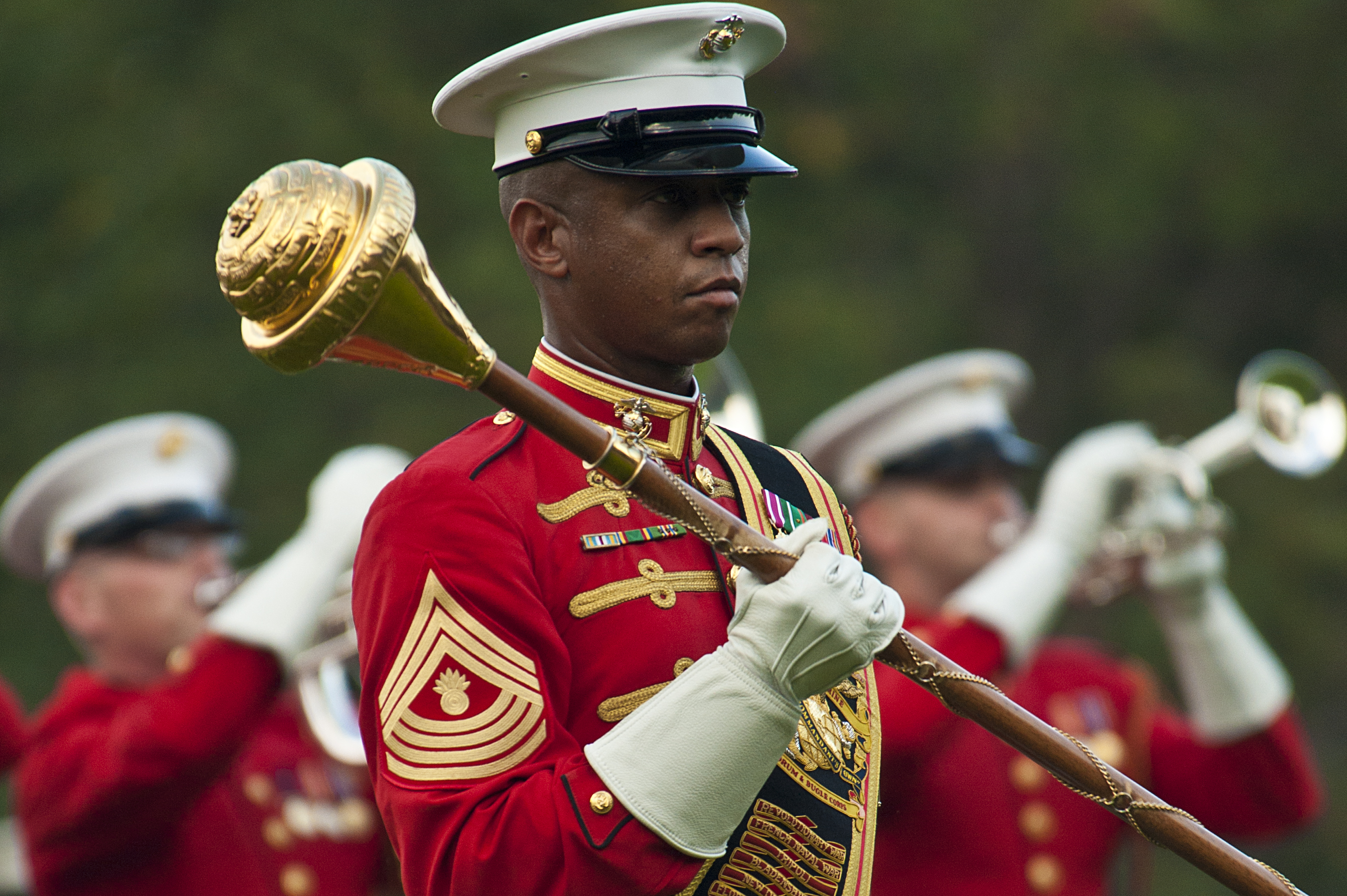
A Master Gunnery Sergeant pictured during the 2012 Sunset Parade.

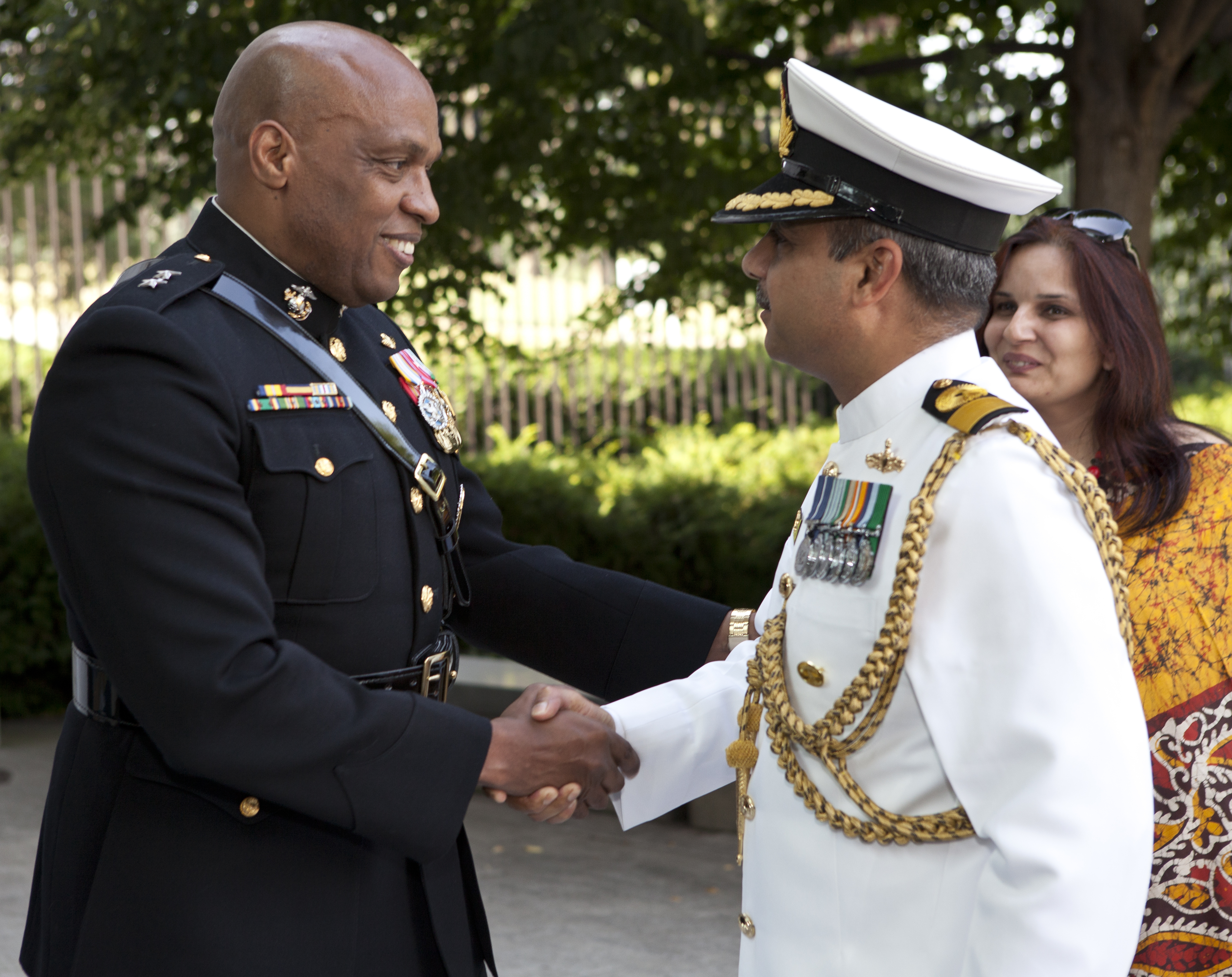
Commodore Alok Bhatnagar (right) of the Indian Navy is received as guest of honor by Major General Vincent R. Stewart at the 2013 Sunset Parade.

A joint evening drill with the British Royal Marines in 1956 at the Bermuda Searchlight Tattoo convinced Marine officers that they would achieve a more dramatic effect by moving the afternoon parade to the evening hours and performing it under spotlights. They implemented the change that year, resulting in the Friday Evening Parade. Meanwhile, the drill formerly performed during the afternoon parade was moved to Tuesday evenings and its location changed to the Marine Corps War Memorial, replacing the more modest guard mount that had occurred there since 1955. The afternoon parade is now called the Sunset Parade; it was temporarily moved in 2018 to the Lincoln Memorial as the War Memorial undergoes refurbishment.

== Organization ==
=== Order of ceremony ===
As of 2018 the Sunset Parade, which lasts approximately one hour, takes place at 7:00 p.m. on Tuesday evenings in June, July, and August.

The parade begins with a demonstration performance by "The Commandant's Own" Drum and Bugle Corps. This is followed by a march on of the participating units, the advance of the national and Marine Corps colors to "You're a Grand Old Flag", the performance of "Star Spangled Banner", a demonstration drill by the U.S. Marine Silent Drill Platoon, and a pass in review for a guest of honor set to "Semper Fidelis" and the "Marines' Hymn". It concludes with "Taps", the retirement of the colors to the trio section of the "National Emblem March", and a march off.

=== Units and personnel ===
The parade involves approximately 200 personnel. Participating units include "The Commandant's Own", the Silent Drill Platoon, the U.S. Marine Corps Color Guard, Alpha Company of the 8th and I garrison, and Bravo Company of the 8th and I garrison.

=== Reception ===
When the Sunset Parade is held at the Marine Corps Memorial, a pre-parade reception is conducted for the guest of honor at the Women in Military Service for America Memorial at Arlington National Cemetery.

== See also ==
- Beating Retreat
