= Gumpathon =

The Gumpathon was a run across the United States undertaken by five British and one American servicemen to raise money for wounded veterans. The 3,530 mile journey began in New York City on September 10, 2010 and ended at the Santa Monica pier eight weeks later on November 11, Veterans Day / Remembrance Day.

== Runners ==
- CSgt Damian Todd RM
- Mark Ormrod
- Master Gunnery Sergeant Charles "Chunks" Padilla USMC
- Marine Jamie Jobson
- Cpl Lloyd Fenner RM
- SSgt James Mazzoni-Dalton Army Physical Training Corps
