= Private first class =

Military rank

Private first class (French: Soldat de 1^{re} classe; Spanish: Soldado de primera) is a military rank held by junior enlisted personnel in many armed forces. It represents someone who has minimal training, experience, and authority within the military. Their level of authority depends on the nation and branch they are serving in.

== French speaking countries ==
In France and other French speaking countries, the rank Soldat de première classe (lit. 'soldier of the first class'; transl. private first class) is used.

== Poland ==
In Poland, the rank is called Starszy szeregowy (transl. Senior private).

== Singapore ==
Introduced in 1983, the honorific rank is awarded to hardworking conscript citizen-soldiers who performed well in their National Service term. Private First Class (PFC) wear a rank insignia of a single chevron pointing down.

The Private First Class (PFC) rank is rarely awarded nowadays by the Singapore Armed Forces. All private enlistees can be promoted directly to Lance Corporal (LCP) should they meet the minimum qualifying requirements, conduct appraisal and work performance.

== United States ==
Private first class
- Army and Marine Corps
- Country: United States
- Service branch: United States Army United States Marine Corps
- Abbreviation: PFC
- Rank group: Enlisted
- NATO rank code: OR-3 (USA) OR-2 (USMC)
- Pay grade: E-3 (USA); E-2 (USMC)
- Next higher rank: Specialist (USA); Lance corporal (USMC)
- Next lower rank: Private PV2 (USA); Private (USMC)
- Equivalent ranks: E-3; Seaman (USN & USCG) Airman first class (USAF); Specialist 3 (USSF); E-2; Seaman apprentice (USN & USCG) Airman (USAF); Specialist 2 (USSF)

=== United States Army ===
In the United States Army, recruits usually enter service as a private in pay grade E-1. Private (E-2), designated by a single chevron, is typically an automatic promotion after six months of service. Private first class (E-3), equivalent to NATO grade OR-3, is designated by a single chevron with one arc or "rocker," and is more common among soldiers who have served in the U.S. Army for one year or more. Soldiers who have achieved an associate degree or its equivalent are entitled to enter the Army at this pay grade.

The rank of private first class has existed since 1846 and, prior to 1919, its insignia consisted of the branch of service insignia without any arcs or chevrons. The Secretary of War approved "an arc of one bar" (i.e., a "rocker") under the branch of service or trade insignia for privates first class on 22 July 1919. From August 5, 1920, to May 28, 1968, the rank insignia for private first class was a single chevron, per War Department Circular No. 303. On May 28, 1968, the insignia was changed to its current form, consisting of a single chevron with one arc.

=== United States Marine Corps ===
In the United States Marine Corps, the rank of private first class is the second lowest (pay grade E-2), just under lance corporal and just above private, equivalent to NATO grade OR-2. It was established on July 1, 1918, to match the already existing Army rank, primarily because US Marine units were "often called upon to serve" with US Army organizations, such as in the American Expeditionary Force that served in Europe during World War I (e.g. 4th Marine Brigade of the U.S. Army's 2nd Infantry Division). At the time the two ranks were directly equivalent. However, the USMC rank of PFC is one grade lower (E-2) than the similarly titled US Army rank.

== Gallery ==
Soldat de 1^{re} classe
(Benin Army)

Soldat de 1^{re} classe
(Burkina Faso Ground Forces)

Soldat de 1^{re} classe
(Kirundi: Umusoda wo mu murwi wa mbere)
(Burundi Army)

Soldat première
(Cameroon Ground Forces)

Soldat première
(Central African Ground Forces)

Soldat première
(Chadian Ground Forces)

Soldat de 1^{re} classe
(Comorian Army)

Soldat de 1^{re} classe
(Land Forces of the DR Congo)

Soldat de 1^{re} classe
(Congolese Ground Forces)

Soldat première
(Djiboutian Army)

Soldat première
(Gabonese Army)

Soldado de primera
(Guatemalan Army)

Soldat de 1^{re} classe
(Guinea Ground Forces)

Primeiro-soldado
(Army of Guinea-Bissau)

Soldat de 1^{re} classe
(Ivory Coast Ground Forces)

Private first class
(Liberian Ground Forces)

Soldat de 1^{re} classe
(Malian Army)

Soldado de primera
(Mexican Army)

Soldat de 1^{re} classe
(Royal Moroccan Army)

Primeiro soldado
(Mozambican Army)

Soldado de primera
(Nicaraguan Army)

Soldat de 1^{re} classe
(Niger Army)

Private first class
(Philippine Army)

Soldat de 1^{ère} classe
(Senegalese Army)

Private first class
(Singapore Army)

Soldaat der 1e klasse
(Suriname Army)

Soldat de 1^{re} classe
(Togolese Army)

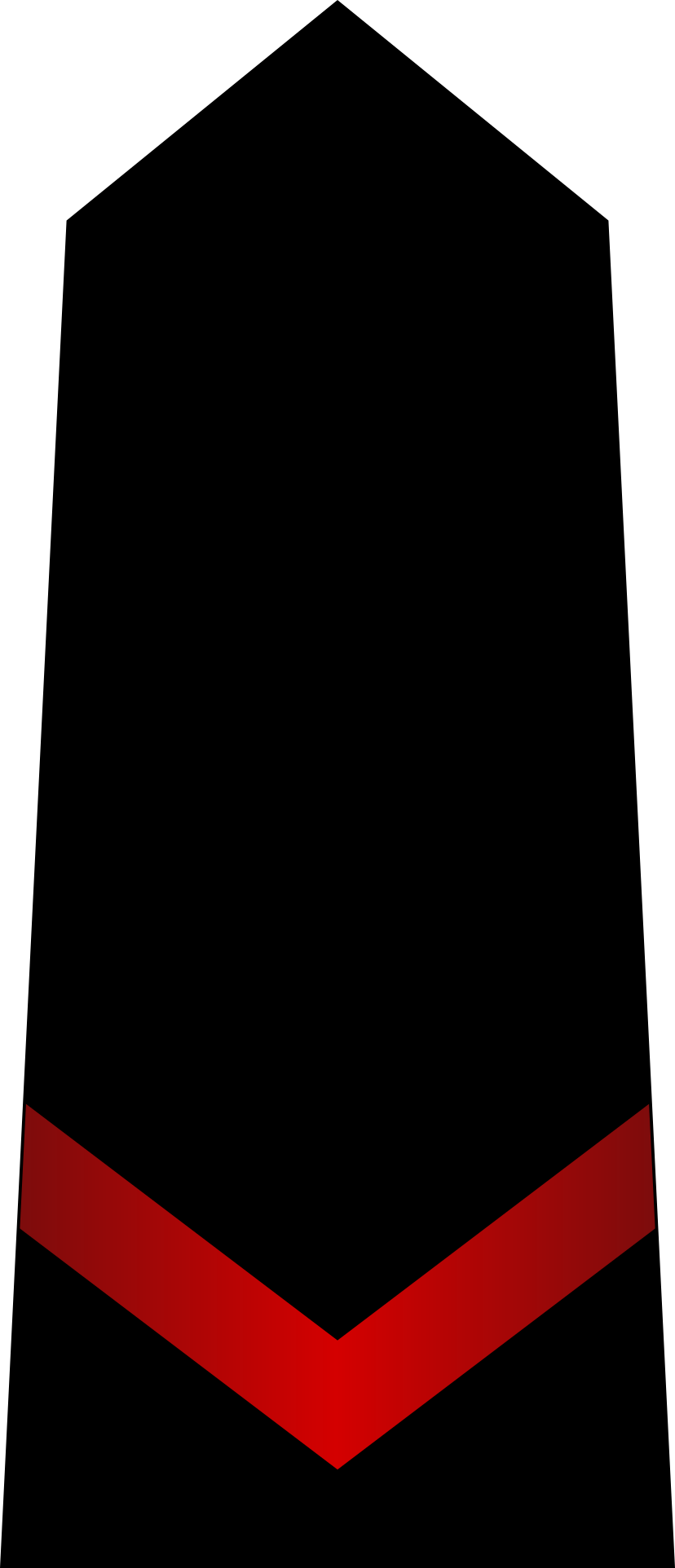
Soldat de 1^{re} classe
(Arabic: جندي أول, romanized: Jundiun awwal)
(Tunisian Army)

Private first class
(United States Army E-3)

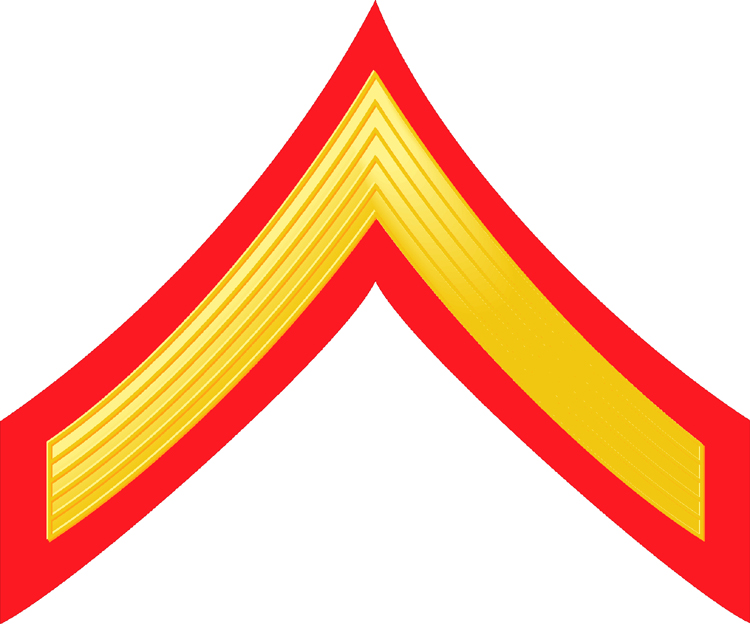
Private First Class (USMC E-2)

== See also ==
- Comparative military ranks
- Gefreiter
- U.S. Army enlisted rank insignia
- U.S. Marine Corps enlisted rank insignia
- U.S. uniformed services pay grades
- United States military pay
