= Colour sergeant =

Military rank

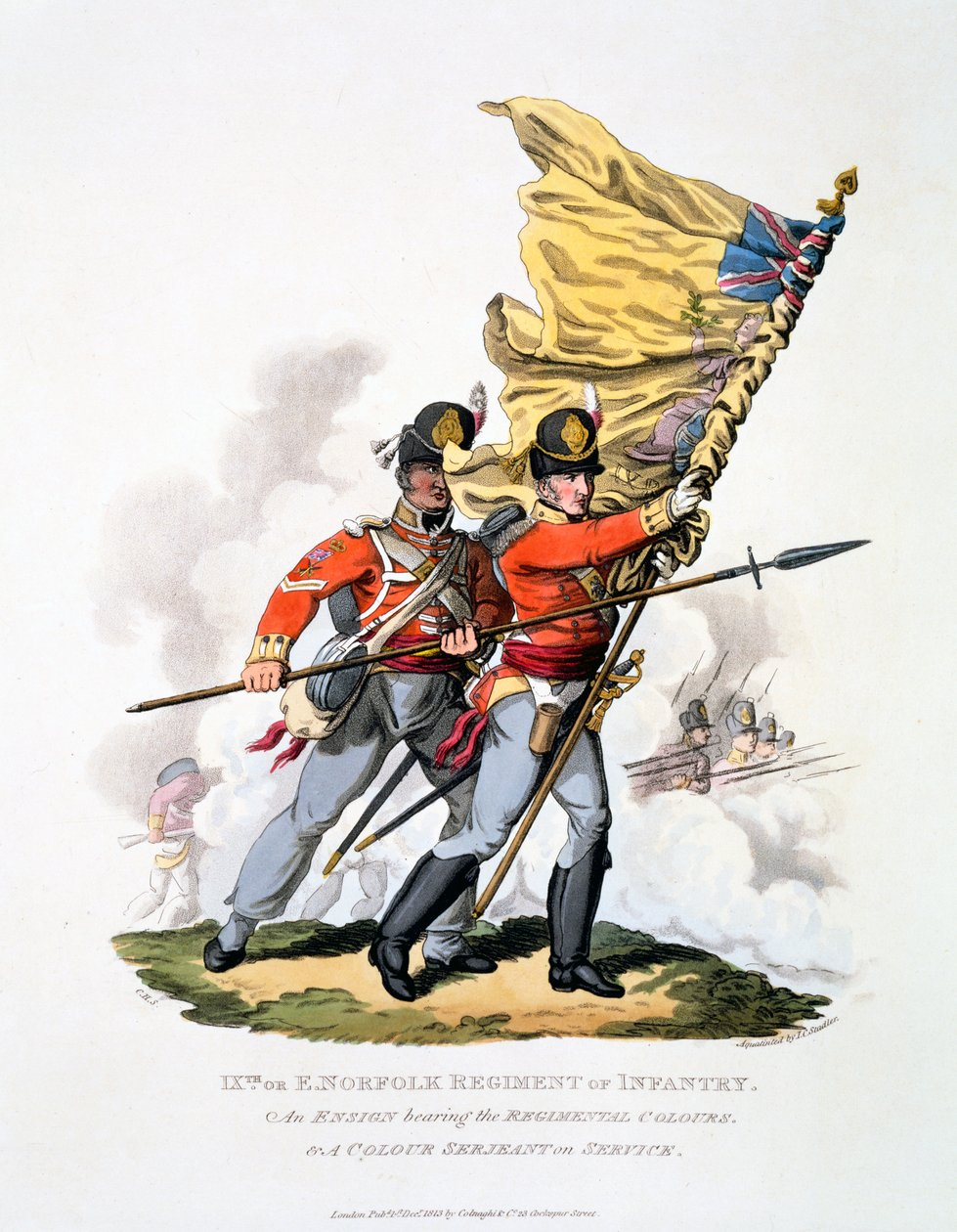
1813 engraving of a colour sergeant (left) of the 9th Regiment of Foot

Colour sergeant (CSgt or C/Sgt) is a non-commissioned officer rank found in several armies and marine corps.

== Australia ==
In the Australian Army, the rank of colour sergeant has only existed in the Corps of Staff Cadets at the Royal Military College, Duntroon.

== Canada ==
Colour sergeant is a rank in the Foot Guards regiments of the Canadian Army, specifically in the Governor General's Foot Guards and the Canadian Grenadier Guards and also previously in The Canadian Guards. It is the equivalent to warrant officer; a colour sergeant wears the rank insignia of a warrant officer (a royal crown) on all uniforms except No. 1 Ceremonial Dress, on which a special rank badge is worn: three chevrons, point down, surmounted by an image of regimental colours.

Canadian colour sergeants are addressed in the same manner as their British counterparts.

== New Zealand ==
The New Zealand Officer Cadet School had its own unique rank structure which included the ranks of colour sergeant and colour corporal. The insignia of a colour sergeant consisted of three chevrons surmounted by two crossed New Zealand flags with the St Edward's Crown on top. The insignia of a colour corporal consisted of two chevrons surmounted by two crossed New Zealand flags with the St Edward's Crown on top. The rank insignia is no longer in use due to the Army's overhaul under Major General Dodson which removed all distinguishing corps insignia in the mid to late 1990s.

== United Kingdom ==
Colour sergeant
- Army and Royal Marine insignia
- Country: United Kingdom
- Service branch: British Army; Royal Marines
- Abbreviation: CSgt; C/Sgt
- Rank group: Non-commissioned officer
- NATO rank code: OR-7
- Pay grade: Range 4
- Formation: 1813
- Next higher rank: Warrant officer class 2
- Next lower rank: Sergeant
- Equivalent ranks: Staff sergeant (army); Chief petty officer (navy); Flight sergeant (RAF)

Colour sergeant (CSgt or C/Sgt) is a non-commissioned rank in the Royal Marines and infantry regiments of the British Army, ranking above sergeant and below warrant officer class 2. It has a NATO ranking code of OR-7 and is equivalent to the rank of staff sergeant in other branches of the Army, flight sergeant or chief technician in the Royal Air Force, and chief petty officer in the Royal Navy. The insignia is the monarch's crown above three downward pointing chevrons.

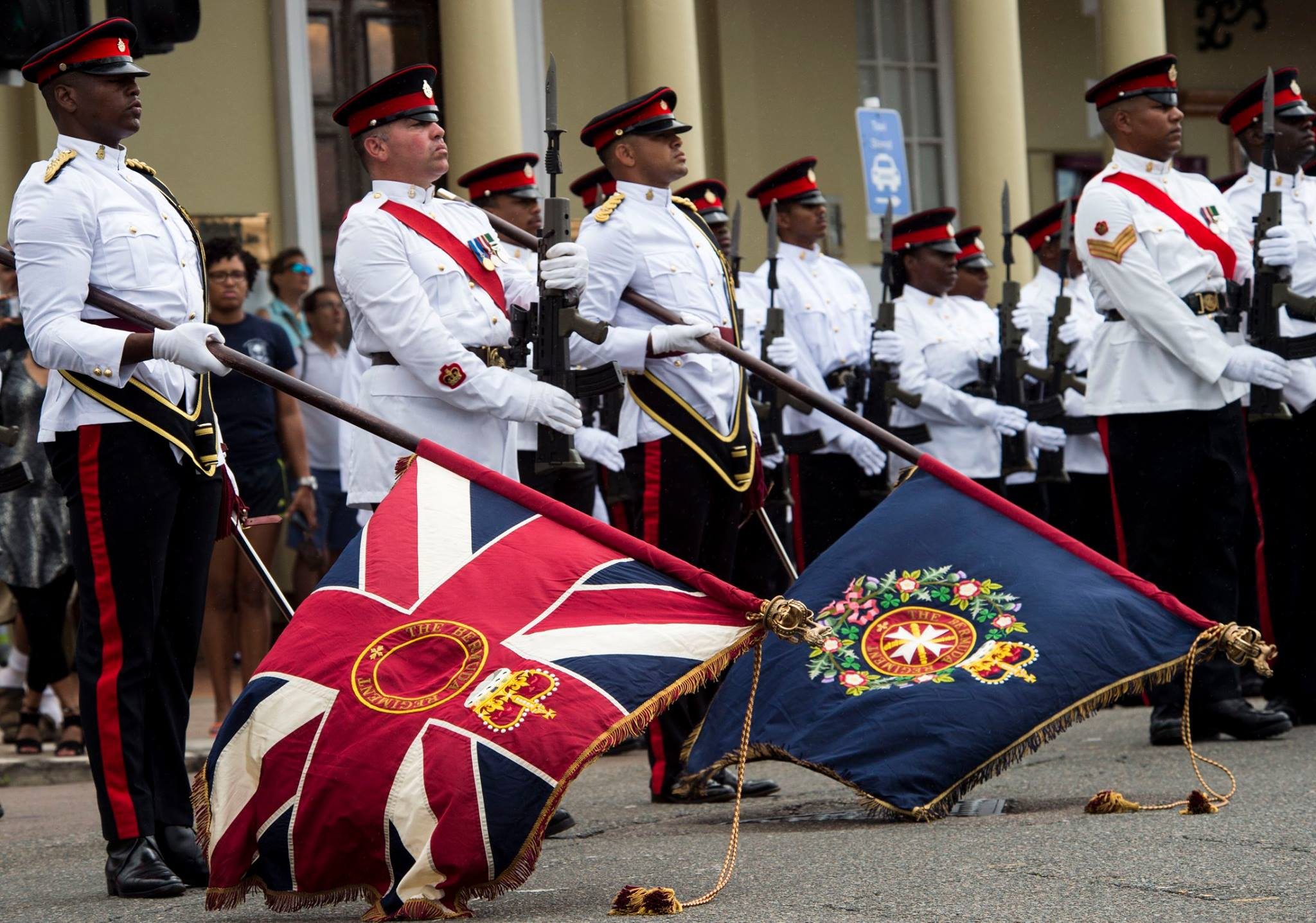
Colour party of the Royal Bermuda Regiment, with a colour sergeant to the left of the colours

The rank was introduced into British Army infantry regiments in 1813 during the Napoleonic Wars to reward long-serving sergeants; a single colour sergeant was appointed to each company as the senior NCO. From 1 October 1913, British infantry battalions were reorganised from eight companies to four, leaving two colour sergeants in each new company. The senior of the pair was appointed to the new appointment of company sergeant major and the junior to that of company quartermaster sergeant. In 1915, CSMs were given the new rank of warrant officer class II, but the CQMS of an infantry company continued to hold the rank of colour sergeant. The Royal Marines also retained the rank throughout.

Historically, colour sergeants of British line regiments protected ensigns, the most junior officers who were responsible for carrying their battalions' colours to rally troops in battles. For this reason, to reach the rank of colour sergeant was considered a prestigious attainment, granted normally to those sergeants who had displayed courage on the field of battle. This tradition continues today as colour sergeants form part of a colour party in military parades. During ceremonial events, it is from a colour sergeant that the ensign collects the colour of the battalion or regiment.

Colour sergeants are referred to and addressed as "Colour Sergeant" or "Colour" ("Colour Sergeant Hewitt" or "Colour Hewitt", for instance) in the Army, or as "Colour Sergeant" or "Colours" in the Royal Marines, and never by the more junior rank of "Sergeant". Unusually, NCOs with the rank of colour sergeant who hold the appointment of company quartermaster sergeant are still addressed and referred to by their rank, not their appointment. In Foot Guards regiments, colour sergeants are addressed as "Sir" and afforded the respect and privileges normally accorded to warrant officers. In The Rifles, the spelling "colour serjeant" is used, in common with other Rifles ranks and appointments including the word serjeant.

In the Royal Marines Band Service, the bandmasters of the seven Royal Navy Volunteer Bands usually hold the rank of band colour sergeant. The senior playing musician in a Royal Marines band also holds this rank, which replaced the rank of bandmaster in 1969.

Colour sergeants and warrant officers form an important part of the instructor cadre at the Royal Military Academy Sandhurst.

Colour Sergeant (1813–1856)

Colour Sergeant (1865–1868)

Colour Sergeant (1868–1901)

Colour Sergeant (1902-1953) (Service Dress)

Colour Sergeant (1953-2023) (Service Dress)

Colour Sergeant (2023-Present) (Service Dress)

Colour Sergeant (Foot Guards) (2023-Present) (Service Dress)

Colour Sergeant (Foot Guards) (2023-Present) (Full Dress)

== United States ==
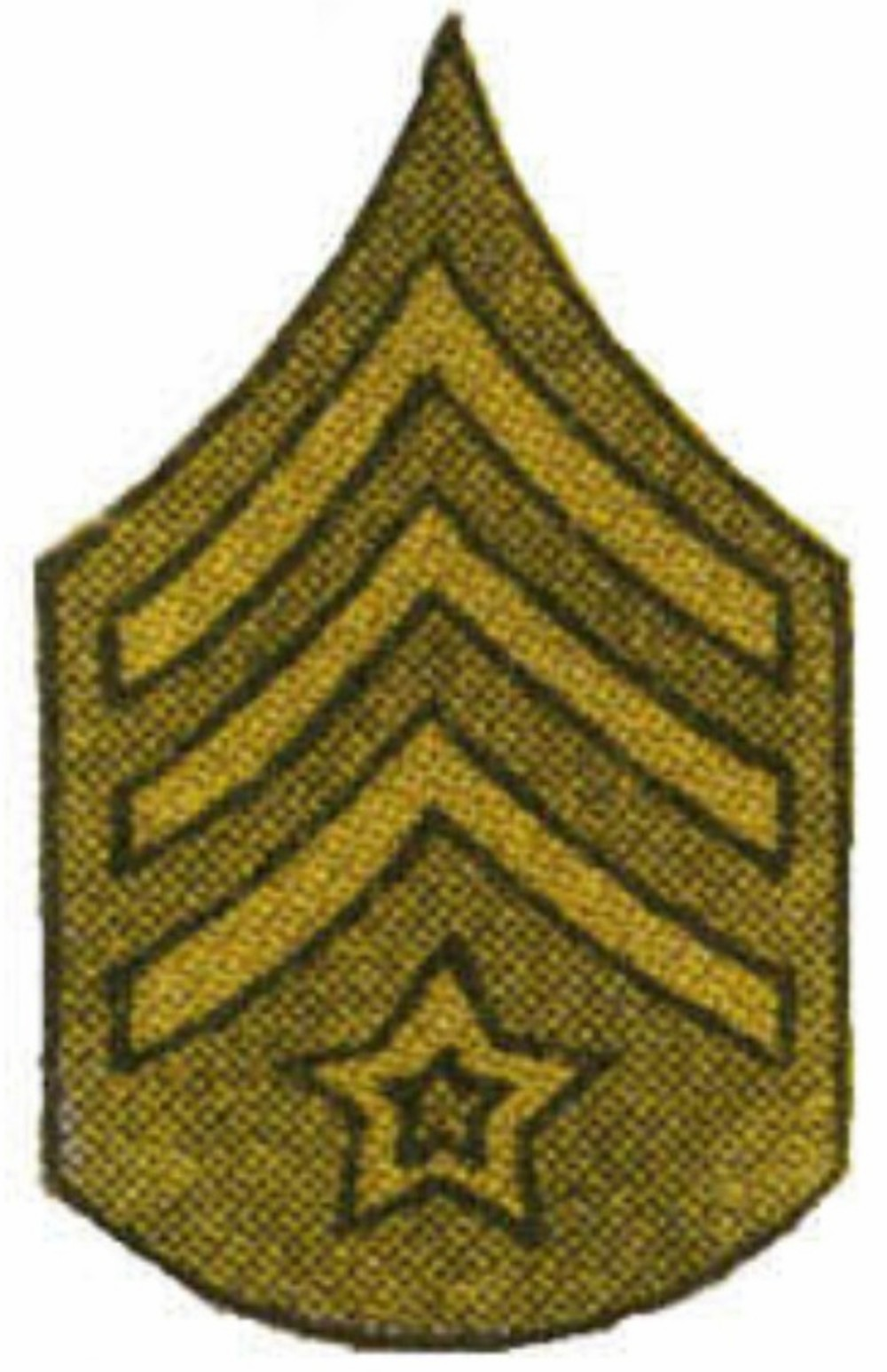
Color sergeant insignia used by the United States Army during World War I

Color sergeant is an NCO rank that was used historically in the United States Army, most recently during World War I. Within the United States Military Academy at West Point, the term is used to distinguish second class cadets who are assigned to the Brigade Color Guard (one bearer per colour plus two guards). They are commanded by a first class cadet designated as the color captain.. In the Virginia Tech Corps of Cadets, the rank is given to third year cadets who are members of the Regimental Color Guard, with the exception of the guard's NCO-in-command, who holds the rank of cadet command color sergeant. All color sergeants in the VTCC must go through the guard's joining process (Tap) again, even if they served as cadet color corporals on the guard as sophomores.

The term is used in the United States Marine Corps as a billet for sergeants who carry the colours. Additionally, there is a billet of Color Sergeant of the Marine Corps, a sergeant (E5) who is the Commandant of the Marine Corps' ceremonial representative and the platoon sergeant of the Marine Corps Battle Colors Detachment.

== See also ==
- Comparative military ranks
