= United States Marine Corps rank insignia =

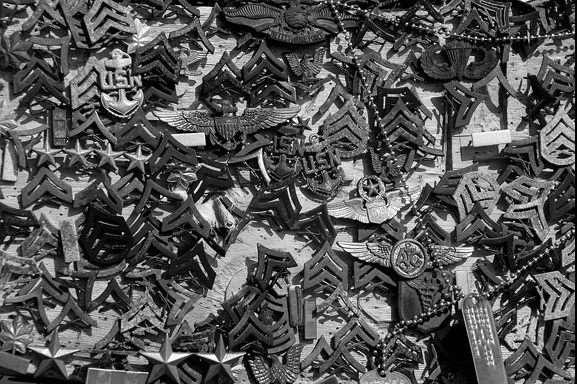
Various Marine and Navy rank insignia (as well as other devices) left at the summit of Mount Suribachi on Iwo Jima.

United States Marine Corps rank insignia are the devices worn by officers in the United States Marine Corps, in order to provide distinction from other ranks. Different styles of rank insignia are worn on different uniforms of the United States Marine Corps.

Commissioned officers, which are distinguished from other officers by their commission, or formal written authority, have ranks that are subdivided into general officers, field-grade officers, and company-grade officers. Warrant officers provide leadership and training in specialized fields and skills. Enlisted Marines with paygrades of E-4 and E-5 are non-commissioned officers (NCOs) while those at E-6 and higher are staff noncommissioned officers (SNCOs). The E-8 and E-9 levels each have two ranks per pay grade, each with different responsibilities. Gunnery sergeants (E-7) indicate on their annual evaluations (called "fitness reports") their preferred promotional track: master sergeant or first sergeant.

== Commissioned officers ==
Commissioned officers are distinguished from other officers by their commission, which is the formal written authority issued in the name of the President of the United States, that confers the rank and authority of a Marine officer. Commissioned officers carry the "special trust and confidence" of the President of the United States. Commissioned officer ranks are further subdivided into general officers, field-grade officers, and company-grade officers. The highest billets in the Marine Corps, the Commandant of the Marine Corps and the Assistant Commandant of the Marine Corps are, by statute, four-star ranks, as the Marine Corps is a separate naval service under the Department of the Navy.

US DoD pay grade	O-10	O-9	O-8	O-7	O-6	O-5	O-4	O-3	O-2	O-1
NATO code	OF-9	OF-8	OF-7	OF-6	OF-5	OF-4	OF-3	OF-2	OF-1
Insignia
Service uniform insignia
Blue dress uniform insignia
Title	General	Lieutenant general	Major general	Brigadier general	Colonel	Lieutenant colonel	Major	Captain	First lieutenant	Second lieutenant
Abbreviation	Gen	LtGen	MajGen	BGen	Col	LtCol	Maj	Capt	1stLt	2ndLt

== Warrant officers ==
Warrant officers provide leadership and training in specialized fields and skills. Unlike other nation's militaries (which rank warrant officers as SNCO equivalents), the United States Military confers warrants and commissions on its warrant officers and classifies them into a separate category senior to all enlisted grades of rank (including officer candidates), cadets, and midshipmen. Because warrant officers are officer-level technical specialists, they generally do not exercise command outside of their specialty. Warrant officers come primarily from the SNCO ranks.

A chief warrant officer, CWO2–CWO5, serving in the MOS 0306 "Infantry Weapons Officer" is often referred to as "Marine gunner," which does not replace his rank. A Marine gunner replaces the chief warrant officer insignia on the left collar with a bursting bomb insignia. Other warrant officers are sometimes incorrectly referred to as "gunner".

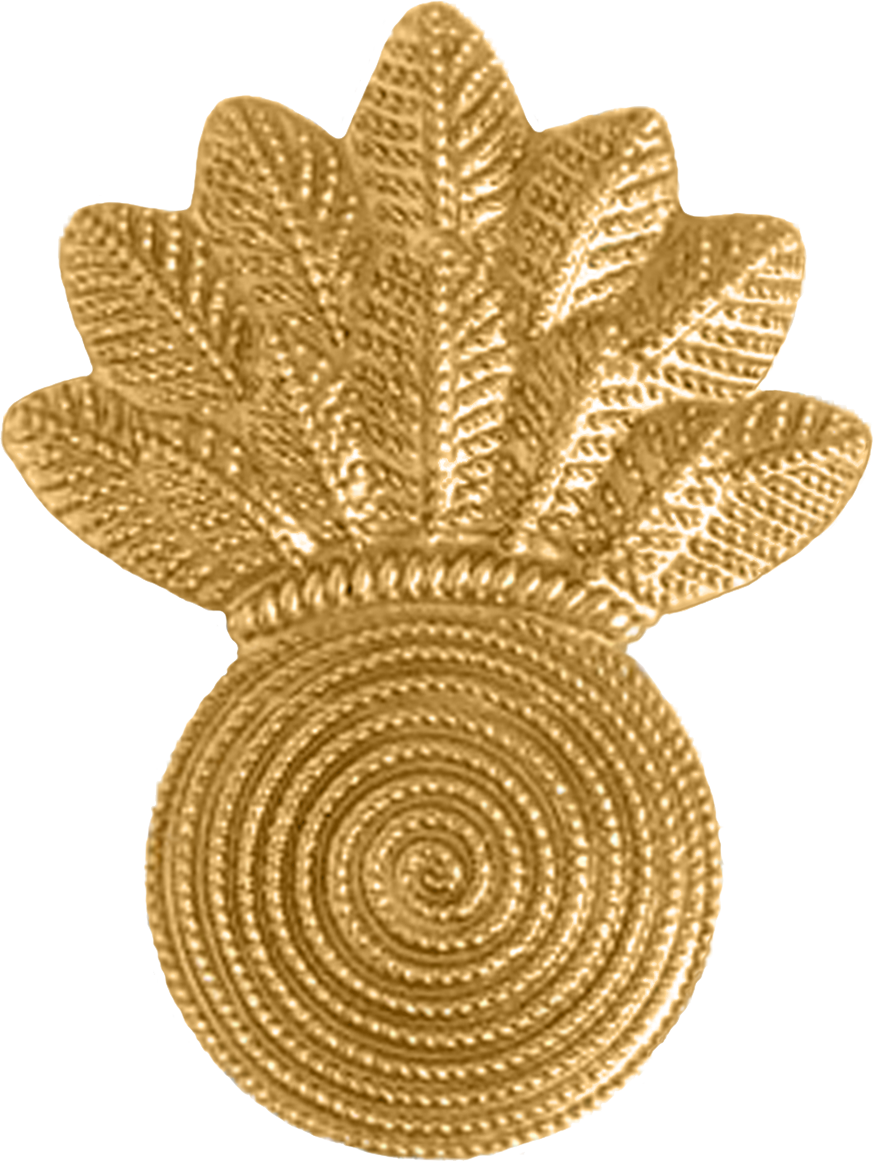
US DoD pay grade	Marine Gunner Insignia	W-5	W-4	W-3	W-2	W-1
NATO code	Marine Gunner Insignia	WO-5	WO-4	WO-3	WO-2	WO-1
Insignia
Service uniform insignia
Blue dress uniform insignia
Title		Chief warrant officer 5	Chief warrant officer 4	Chief warrant officer 3	Chief warrant officer 2	Warrant officer 1
Abbreviation		CWO5	CWO4	CWO3	CWO2	WO

=== Timeline of warrant officer rank changes ===
Uniformed services pay grade	W-5	W-4	W-3	W-2	W-1
United States Marine Corps (1926–1943)					(branch insignia only)
United States Marine Corps (1926–1943)				Chief warrant officer	Warrant officer
United States Marine Corps (1943–1949)
United States Marine Corps (1943–1949)				Commissioned warrant officer	Warrant officer
United States Marine Corps (1949–1954)
United States Marine Corps (1949–1954)		Commissioned warrant officer 4	Commissioned warrant officer 3	Commissioned warrant officer 2	Warrant officer 1
United States Marine Corps (1954–1992)
United States Marine Corps (1954–1992)		Chief warrant officer 4	Chief warrant officer 3	Chief warrant officer 2	Warrant officer 1
United States Marine Corps
United States Marine Corps	Chief warrant officer 5	Chief warrant officer 4	Chief warrant officer 3	Chief warrant officer 2	Warrant officer 1

== Enlisted ==
Enlisted Marines with paygrades of E-4 and E-5 are non-commissioned officers (NCOs) while those at E-6 and higher are staff non-commissioned officers (SNCOs). The E-8 and E-9 levels each have multiple ranks per pay grade, each with different responsibilities. Gunnery sergeants (E-7) indicate on their annual evaluations (called "fitness reports") their preferred promotional track: master sergeant or first sergeant. The first sergeant and sergeant major ranks are command-oriented senior enlisted advisors, with Marines of these ranks serving as the senior enlisted Marines in a unit, charged to assist the commanding officer in matters of discipline, administration, and the morale and welfare of the unit. Master sergeants and master gunnery sergeants provide technical leadership as occupational specialists in their specific MOS. First sergeants typically serve as the senior enlisted Marine in a company, battery, or other unit at a similar echelon, while sergeants major serve the same role in battalions, squadrons, or larger units.

The Sergeant Major of the Marine Corps is a billet and with it carries a special rank insignia, conferred on the senior enlisted Marine of the entire Marine Corps, personally selected by the Commandant of the Marine Corps. It, the recently created position of the Senior Enlisted Advisor to the Chairman and the Marine gunner are the only billets which rate modified rank insignia in place of the traditional rank insignia.

US DoD pay grade	E-9 Special (Note: SEAC and SMMC are within the E-9 pay grade but are given unique pay.)		E-9		E-8		E-7	E-6	E-5	E-4	E-3	E-2	E-1
NATO code	OR-9				OR-8		OR-7	OR-6	OR-5	OR-4	OR-3	OR-2	OR-1
Service uniform insignia													No insignia
Blue dress uniform insignia													No insignia
Title	Senior Enlisted Advisor to the Chairman	Sergeant Major of the Marine Corps	Sergeant major	Master gunnery sergeant	First sergeant	Master sergeant	Gunnery sergeant	Staff sergeant	Sergeant	Corporal	Lance corporal	Private first class	Private
Abbreviation	SEAC	SMMC	SgtMaj	MGySgt	1stSgt	MSgt	GySgt	SSgt	Sgt	Cpl	LCpl	PFC	Pvt

Different styles of rank insignia are worn on different Marine uniforms:

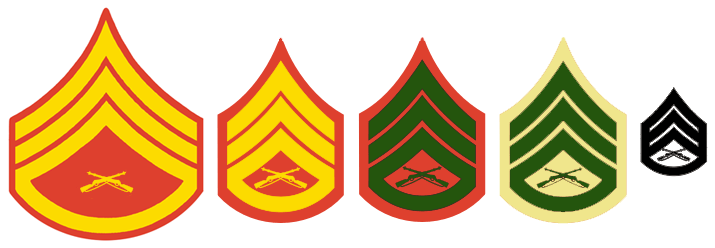
L to R: Evening Dress coat, Dress Blue coat, Service Dress coat, Service Dress "B" and "C" shirt, and combat utility pin-on insignia for a staff sergeant

Gold stripes on a red flash are worn on the Dress Blue uniform coat. Green stripes on a red flash are worn on the Service uniform coat. Rank insignia are worn on the upper sleeve of both coats. Khaki uniform shirts use green stripes on a khaki flash and are worn on the upper sleeves of both long and short-sleeved shirts. Utility uniform rank insignia are black metal pins and are worn on the collars, or black embroidered insignia sewn into patches of material when wearing armor. Musicians in the United States Marine Band wear insignia with lyre in the center as opposed to the crossed rifles, to denote their lack of a combat mission; full-service Marines who are attached to the 10 field bands of the Operating Forces and Supporting Establishment continue to wear their normal rank insignia. The crossed M1 rifles insignia were added to E-3 through E-8 chevrons in 1959.

=== Timeline of enlisted rank changes ===
Uniformed services pay grade	Special		E-9		E-8		E-7		E-6		E-5		E-4	E-3		E-2	E-1
Pre-1918																	No insignia
Pre-1918							Sergeant major		Technical sergeant		Staff sergeant		Sergeant	Corporal		Lance corporal	Private
1920s–1930s															(Right-sleeve only)		No insignia
1920s–1930s							Sergeant major		Technical sergeant		Staff sergeant		Sergeant	Corporal	Lance corporal	Private first class	Private
1941–1943																	No insignia
1941–1943							Sergeant major/ Master gunnery sergeant	Master technical sergeant	First sergeant/ Gunnery sergeant	Technical sergeant	Platoon sergeant	Staff sergeant	Sergeant	Corporal		Private first class	Private
1943–1944																	No insignia
1943–1944							Sergeant major/ Master gunnery sergeant/ First sergeant	Master technical sergeant	Gunnery sergeant	Technical sergeant	Platoon sergeant	Staff sergeant	Sergeant	Corporal		Private first class	Private
1944–1945							Sergeant major/ Master gunnery sergeant / First sergeant / Master technical sergeant										No insignia
1944–1945							Sergeant major/ Master gunnery sergeant / First sergeant / Master technical sergeant		Gunnery sergeant	Technical sergeant	Platoon sergeant	Staff sergeant	Sergeant	Corporal		Private first class	Private
1946–1959							Sergeant major / First sergeant / Master sergeant										No insignia
1946–1959							Sergeant major / First sergeant / Master sergeant		Technical sergeant		Staff sergeant		Sergeant	Corporal		Private first class	Private
1959–2020																	No insignia
1959–2020	Sergeant Major of the Marine Corps	Sergeant major		Master gunnery sergeant	First sergeant	Master sergeant	Gunnery sergeant		Staff sergeant		Sergeant		Corporal	Lance corporal		Private first class	Private
2020–present																	No insignia
2020–present	Senior Enlisted Advisor to the Chairman	Sergeant Major of the Marine Corps	Sergeant major	Master gunnery sergeant	First sergeant	Master sergeant	Gunnery sergeant		Staff sergeant		Sergeant		Corporal	Lance corporal		Private first class	Private
NATO Code	OR-9				OR-8		OR-7		OR-6		OR-5		OR-4	OR-3		OR-2	OR-1

== See also ==
- British and United States military ranks compared
- Comparative military ranks
- List of United States Marine Corps acronyms and expressions for more nicknames and forms of address
- Ranks and insignia of NATO

== General sources ==
- MCO P1070-12K: Individual Records Administration Manual. United States Marine Corps.
- Nalty, Bernard C.; Truman R. Strobridge; Edwin T. Turnbladh (1962). United States Marine Corps Ranks and Grades, 1775–1962 (PDF). Historical Division, United States Marine Corps.
