= Marine Barracks, Washington, D.C. =

US Marine Corps base in Washington, D.C.

Marine Barracks Washington
- Southeast Washington, D.C. in United States
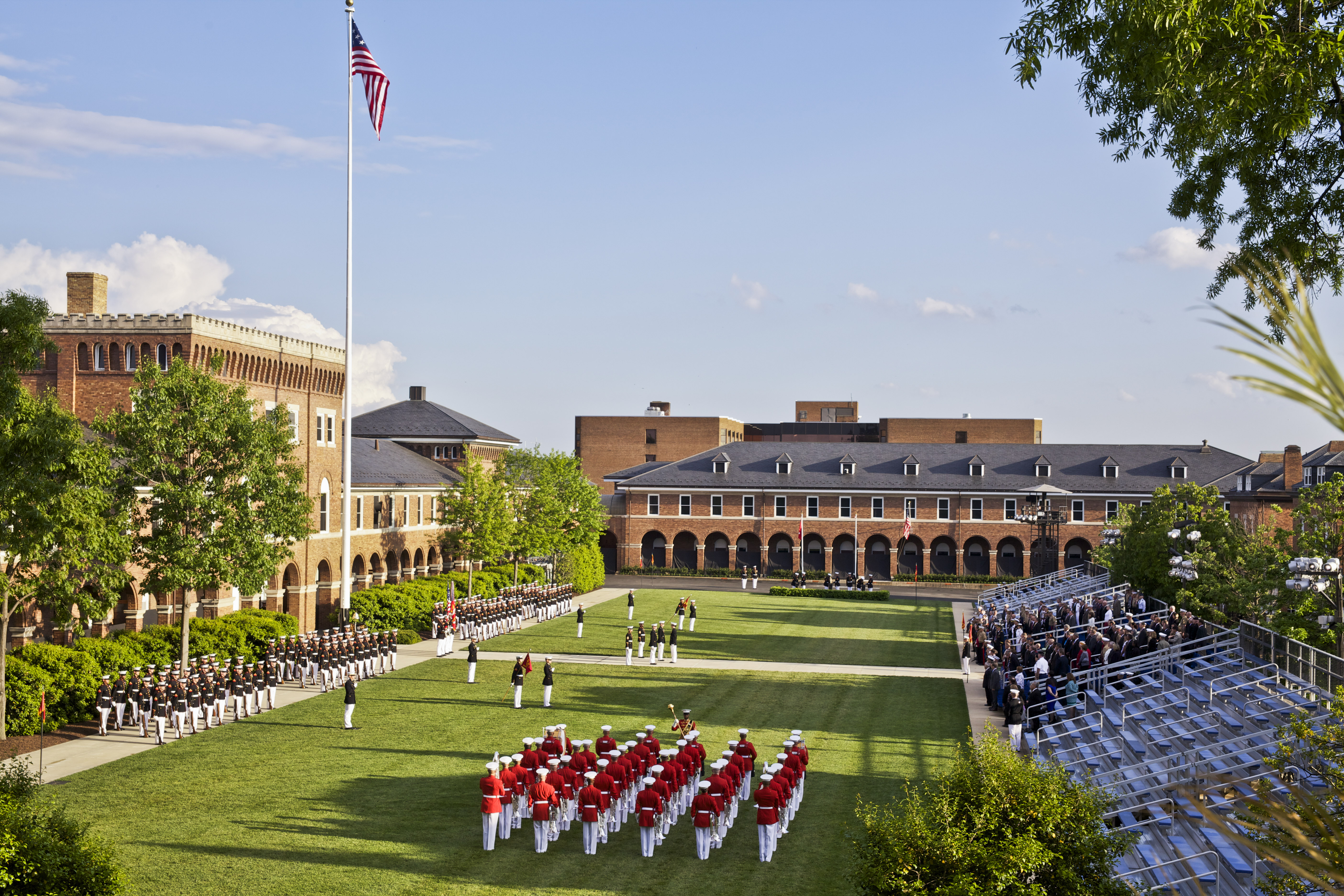
- US Marines pass in review during a ceremony at Marine Barracks Washington during May 2013

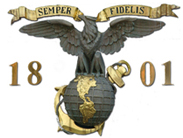

Site information
- Type: Marine Corps barracks
- Owner: Department of Defense
- Operator: US Marine Corps
- Controlled by: Commandant of the Marine Corps (operationally); Marine Corps Installations Command (administratively)
- Open to the public: During parades and ceremonies
- Condition: Operational
- Website: Official website

Location
- Location in the United States
- Coordinates: 38.88039°N 76.99386°W

Site history
- Built: 1801
- In use: 1801 – present
- Battles/wars: War of 1812; Burning of Washington

Garrison information
- Current commander: Colonel Jason C. Copeland
- Past commanders: Charles Heywood; James Carson Breckinridge; Dennis Hejlik
- Occupants: Commandant of the Marine Corps
- U.S. Marine Corps Barracks and Commandant's House
- U.S. National Register of Historic Places
- U.S. National Historic Landmark District
- Area: 6 acres (2.4 ha)
- Architects: George Hadfield (); Hornblower & Marshall (1907 Barracks)
- NRHP reference No.: 72001435

Significant dates
- Added to NRHP: December 27, 1972
- Designated NHLD: May 11, 1976

Marine Barracks, Washington, D.C. is located at the corner of 8th and I streets, Southeast in Washington, D.C. Established in 1801, it is a National Historic Landmark, the oldest post in the United States Marine Corps, the official residence of the commandant of the Marine Corps since 1806, and the main ceremonial grounds of the Corps. It is home to the U.S. Marine Drum and Bugle Corps ("The Commandant's Own") and the U.S. Marine Band ("The President's Own"). Barracks Marines conduct ceremonial missions in and around the National Capital Region as well as abroad. They also provide security at designated locations around Washington, D.C. as necessary, and Barracks officers are part of the White House Social Aide Program.

Marine Barracks Washington and the Historic Home of the Commandants were listed on the National Register of Historic Places in 1972. A 6-acre (2.4 ha) property with eight contributing buildings was included in the listing. It was designated a National Historic Landmark in 1976.

== History ==
The buildings at the Marine Barracks are some of the oldest in Washington, D.C. In 1801, President Thomas Jefferson and Lieutenant Colonel William Ward Burrows, the commandant of the Marine Corps, rode horses about the new capital to find a place suitable for the Marines near the Washington Navy Yard. They chose a location within marching distance of both the Navy Yard and the Capitol and hired architect George Hadfield to design the barracks and the Commandant's House.

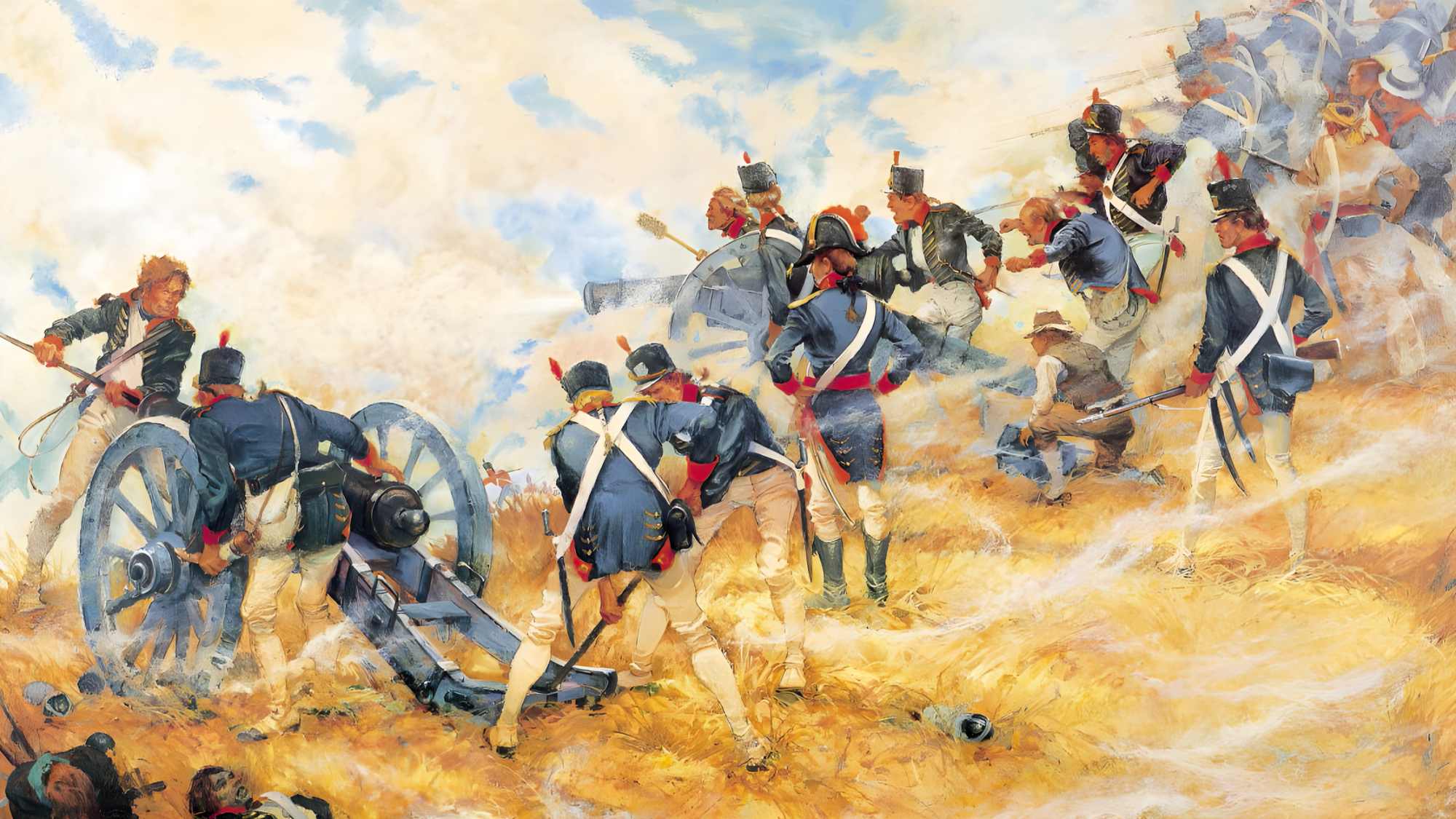
The Final Stand at Bladensburg, Maryland, 24 August 1814

When the British burned Washington during the War of 1812, they also captured the Marine barracks. It is traditionally held within the Marine Corps that, out of respect for the brave showing of the Marines at the Battle of Bladensburg, the British refrained from burning the barracks and the Commandant's House. Though neither Admiral George Cockburn nor General Robert Ross mentioned the Marines specifically in their conversation with the wounded Commodore Joshua Barney, it is now widely acknowledged that the compliment extends towards both Barney's 300 Navy flotilla men and the 103 Marines present.

The Marines had brought three 12-pounder artillery pieces to act as the core of Barney's line. The Flotilla would not have held their ground had it not been for the cannon dispensing grape and canister volleys into the 85th Regiment of Foot (Light Infantry). This is supported by the fact that Baltimore artillery (also covering the bridge at the Washington Turnpike) on the Marines' right flank was only firing round shot in an attempt to stop Lieutenant General William Thornton from crossing the bridge. Round shot, in general, is ineffective against dispersed troops such as the light infantry of the 85th.

This account of events still survives:

The people of the flotilla, under the orders of Captain Barney and the Marines, were justly applauded for their excellent conduct on this occasion. No troops could have stood better; and the fire of both artillery and musketry has been described as to the last degree severe. Captain Barney himself, and Captain Miller, of the Marine Corps, in particular, gained much additional reputation; and their conspicuous gallantry caused a deep and general regret that their efforts could not have been sustained by the rest of the army.

The "last stand" of the sailors and Marines is to this day immortalized by Colonel Charles Waterhouse's painting of Captain Miller's Marines manning two of the three 12-pound Gribeuaval type cannon. The three cannon were hauled from the Marine barracks onto the battlefield to cover a strategic bridgehead. This event has also been marked by sculptor Joanna Blake of Cottage City in her "Undaunted in Battle." It shows a wounded Barney being helped by a Marine and flanked by a sailor presumably representing a member of the flotilla. The background shows a wheeled cannon, likely one of the three hauled to the battlefield by the Marines.

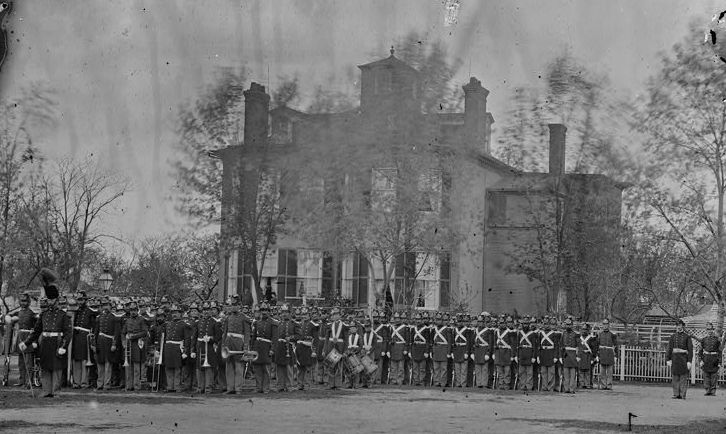
Marine battalion in front of Commandant's House at the Marine Barracks in 1864

Square 927, now the block surrounded by 8th & I, and 9th & G Streets S.E., was entered in the National Register of Historic Places in 1972 and was then designated a National Historic Landmark by the Department of the Interior in 1976. 8th and I has been the home of the Silent Drill Platoon and the Marine Band since the barracks' establishment in 1801 and the residence of the commandant since 1806 when the Commandant's House was completed. The Commandant's House is the only original building left in the complex, the remainder having been rebuilt in 1900 and 1907, to designs by architects Hornblower & Marshall. The Marine Corps Institute moved to the barracks from its previous home at Marine Barracks Quantico in 1920. The Drum and Bugle Corps has been based at the barracks since its formation in 1934.

The barracks complex is one of the oldest government buildings in continuous use in Washington, D.C., though some sources conflict on whether the White House is a year older. While traditionally known as the "oldest post in the Corps", Marines did serve at the Charlestown Navy Yard in Boston a year earlier, though they did not have a permanent detachment until 1805 nor a barracks until 1810, and it was vacated in 1974. The Tun Tavern is considered the birthplace of the Corps, having been used for one of the first Continental Marines' recruiting drives in 1775, though it is disputed if it occurred before one at Samuel Nicholas' family tavern, the Conestoga Waggon [sic].

During the early days of the Civil War and prior to Lincoln's mobilization, the barracks housed about 300 to 400 marines.

== Units ==
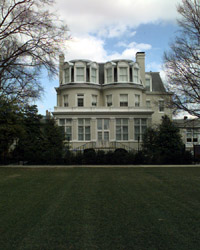
- The Historic Home of the Commandants
  Headquarters and Service Company
  - Marine Corps Enlisted Aide Program
- Ceremonial Company A
  - 1st Platoon
  - 2nd Platoon
  - Marine Corps Silent Drill Platoon
  - United States Marine Corps Color Guard
- Ceremonial Company B
  - 1st Platoon
  - 2nd Platoon
  - 3rd Platoon
  - Marine Corps Body Bearers
- Guard Company
  - Marines serving the White House Communications Agency
- Security Company
- United States Marine Band
- United States Marine Drum and Bugle Corps
- Marines of the United States Naval Academy

== Duties ==
- Funeral escort for Marines and dignitaries.
- Ceremonial honor guard for state functions.
- Security forces for Camp David and the White House Communications Agency.
- Parades:
  - Friday Evening Parade
  - Tuesday Sunset Parade at the Iwo Jima Memorial
- Training to maintain MOS proficiency and emergency preparedness.

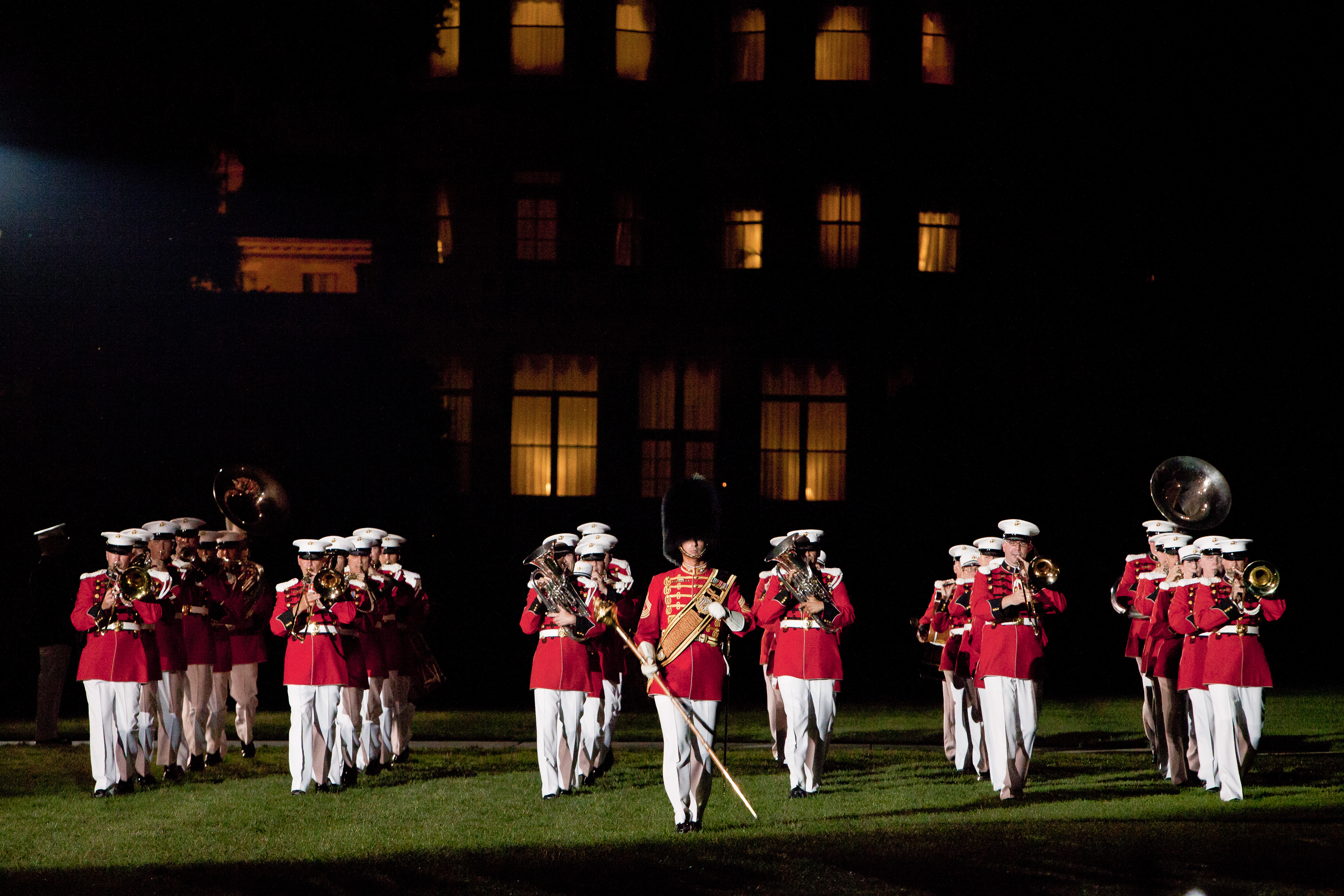
The United States Marine Band at the Friday Evening Parade.

The Marines assigned to the D.C. barracks must meet strict height, weight, and background check standards, since they perform in ceremonial parades, funerals, and other ceremonies for presidential and other national dignitaries. During the summer months, a sunset parade is held every Tuesday evening at the Marine Corps War Memorial in Rosslyn, Virginia near Arlington National Cemetery. In addition, an evening parade takes place at the Barracks every Friday evening from late spring until the end of summer. Since 2018, the sunset parade from the Barracks is broadcast on Facebook Live on select dates via the official FB page of the US Marine Corps, weather conditions permitting.

== 2018 Housing Complex Fire ==
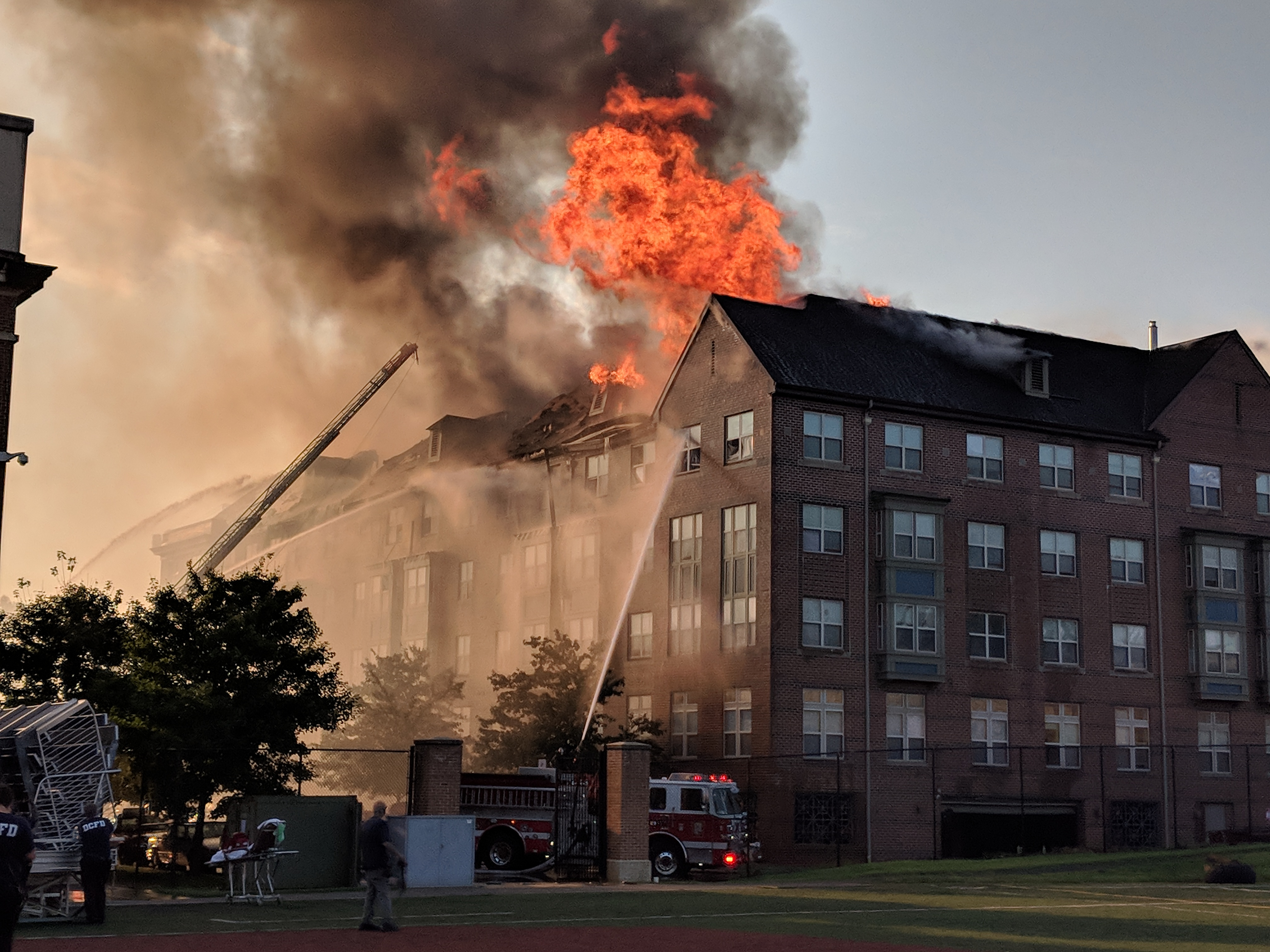
Arthur Capper Senior Apartment Fire 2018

On September 19th, 2018, a senior citizen housing complex directly adjacent to the Marine Barrack's Annex location in southeast D.C., caught fire mid afternoon, prompting an immediate response from Marines and Sailors stationed there. Videos shared to news outlets and social media showcased the quick response from all units stationed at the barracks, with Marines and Sailors assisting with patient movement, assessment, and treatment by local medical personnel and responding EMS services. Of the 190 residents of the complex, all but one were successfully extracted with only 6 patients being sent to local hospitals for minor injuries. One resident, seventy-four year old Raymond Holton, was trapped in his apartment for five days following the fire without electricity or food or water before being found by building engineers contracted to assess damages. President Donald Trump later visited the barracks in November that same year to thank the Marines involved with the response in a private ceremony.

== See also ==
- Latrobe Gate, the oldest continuously manned Marine sentry post in the United States
- List of United States Marine Corps installations
- List of National Historic Landmarks in Washington, D.C.
- Reportedly haunted locations in Washington, D.C.
