= United States Marine Drum and Bugle Corps =

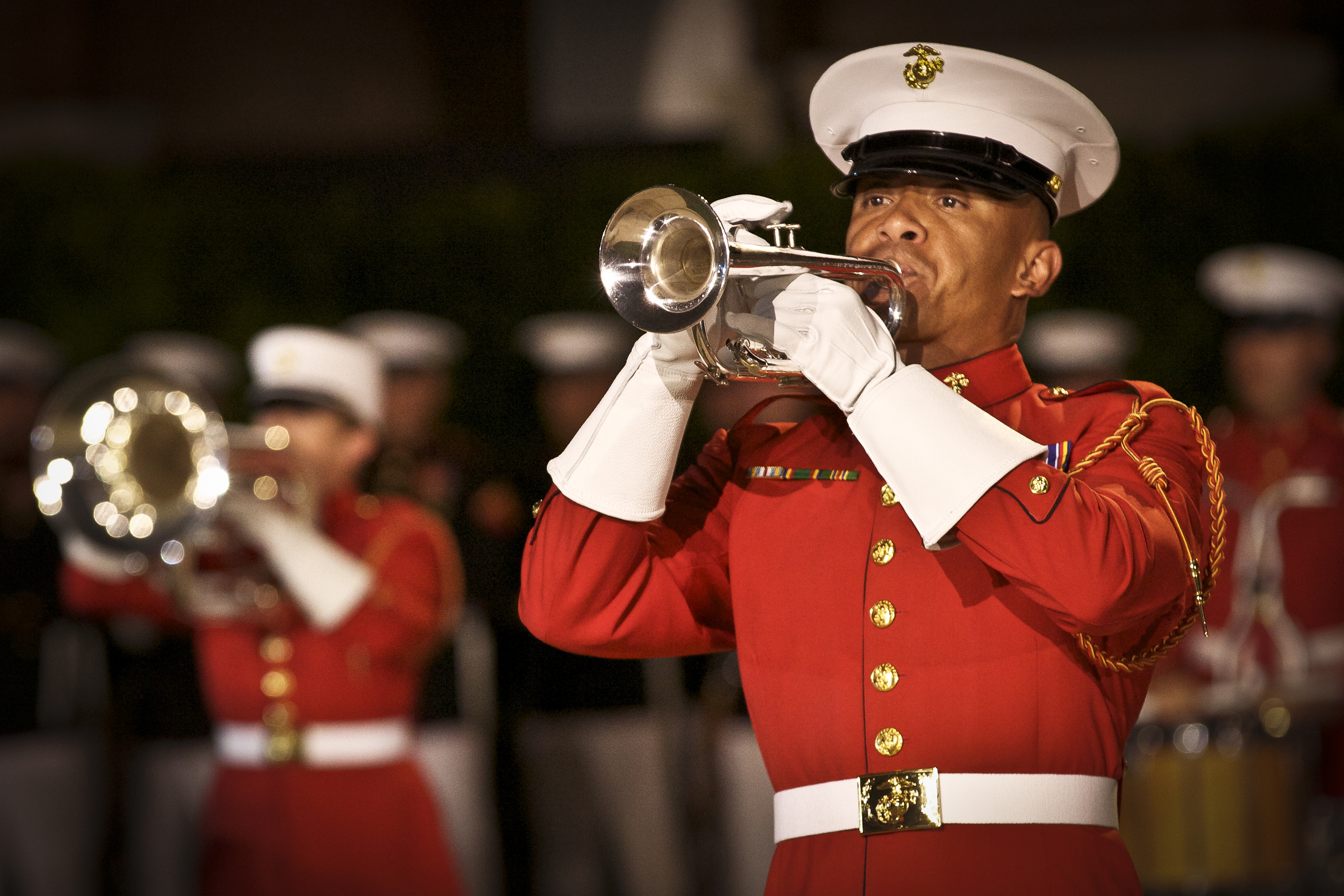
- Active: 9 November 1934
- Country: United States
- Branch: USMC
- Type: Military Band
- Size: 85
- Garrison/HQ: Marine Barracks, Washington D.C.
- Nickname: The Commandant's Own
- Website: www.drumcorps.marines.mil

Commanders
- Director and Commanding Officer: Maj Nathan D. Morris
- Executive Officer: Capt Courtney R. Lawrence
- Operations Officer and Assistant User: CWO2 Patrick B. Montgomery
- Drum Major: MGySgt David J. Cox
- Assistant Drum Major: GySgt Christopher G. Walker

Insignia
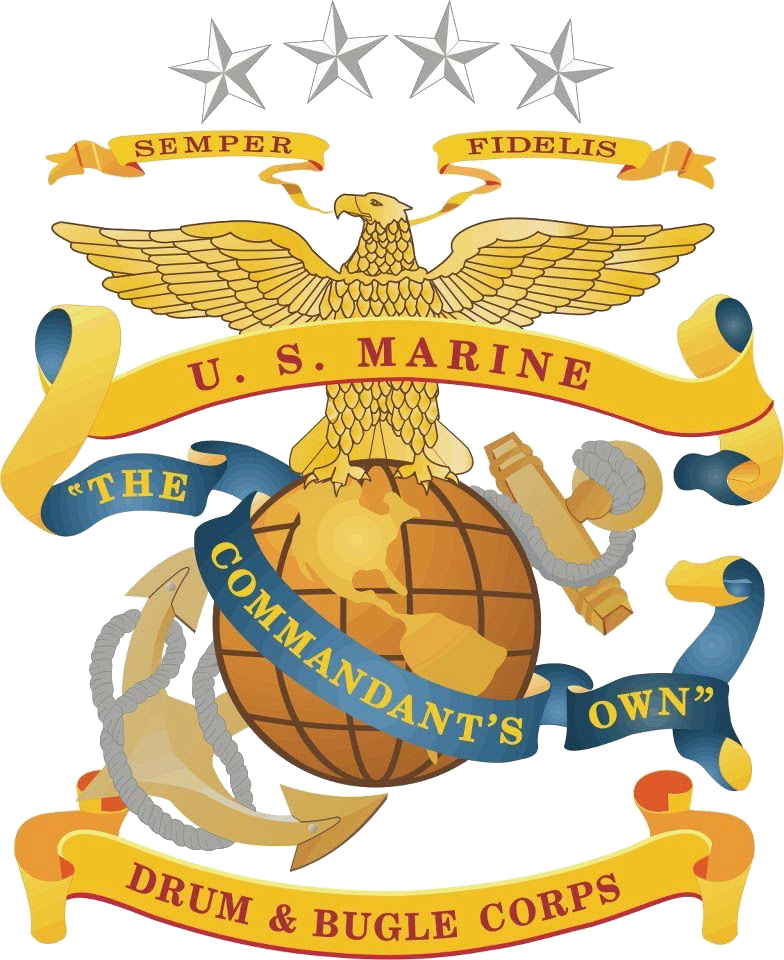
- Identification symbol

The United States Marine Drum & Bugle Corps is a 1934 Music Group from drum and bugle corps of the United States Marine Corps. The D&B is now the only active duty drum and bugle corps in the United States Armed Forces. One of many United States military bands, the United States Marine Drum & Bugle Corps usually consists of about 70 active-duty Marines dressed in ceremonial red and white uniforms. The D&B performs martial and popular music.

The United States Marine Drum & Bugle Corps has been directly designated as "The Commandant's Own" due to the historical connection with the commandant of the Marine Corps. The D&B is entirely separate from its sister organization, the United States Marine Band ("The President's Own"), as well as the ten active-duty United States Marine Corps field bands. The United States Marine Drum & Bugle Corps travels more than 50,000 miles (80,000 km) annually, performing over 400 events worldwide.

During the summer months, the D&B performs in conjunction with "The President's Own" in the traditional Friday Evening Parades at Marine Barracks, Washington D.C., and in the Tuesday Sunset Parades at the Marine Corps War Memorial (Iwo Jima Monument) in Arlington, Virginia. These parades are not street parades, but military parades consisting of ceremonial pomp that are symbolic of Marine professionalism, discipline, and esprit de corps.

Major Nathan D. Morris, of Marietta, Georgia is the seventh and current Commanding Officer of "The Commandant's Own" United States Drum & Bugle Corps, serving in this position since February 2022. Captain Courtney R. Lawrence, of Austin, Texas is the Executive Officer and Director. Master Gunnery Sergeant David J. Cox of Richmond, Virginia is the Drum Major. Gunnery Sergeant Christopher G. Walker of Las Vegas, Nevada is the Assistant Drum Major.

== History ==
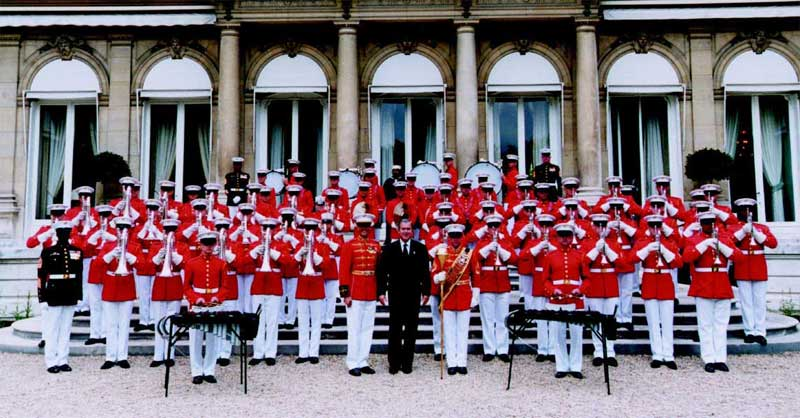
"The Commandant's Own" The United States Marine Drum & Bugle Corps with then President George W. Bush while in France.

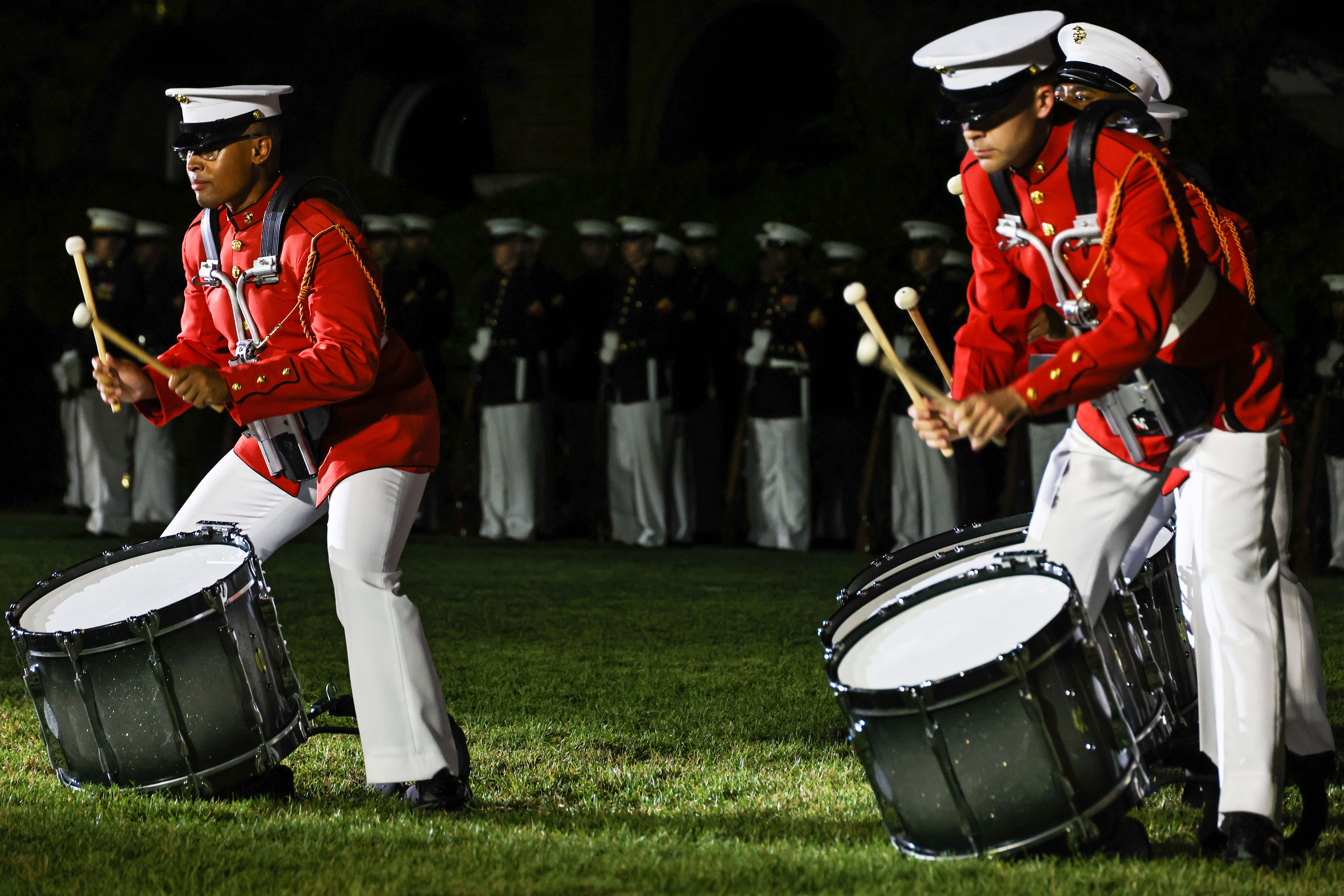
Members of the U.S. Marine Drum and Bugle Corps, perform during a Friday Evening Parade at Marine Barracks Washington, D.C., May 2, 2025

The unit's history traces to the early days of the Marine Corps. In the 18th and 19th centuries, military musicians ("field musics") provided a means of passing commands to Marines in battle. The sound of various drum beats and bugle calls that could be heard over the noise of the battlefield signalled Marines to attack the enemy or retreat. Through the 1930s, Marine Corps posts still authorized several buglers and drummers to play the traditional calls and to ring a ship's bell to signal the time. Until the 1960s, Marine Corps units across the country sported unit drum and bugle corps within their respective rosters.

"The Commandant's Own" The United States Marine Drum & Bugle Corps, the only such formation within the Armed Forces today, was formed in September 1934 at historic Marine Barracks Washington to augment the United States Marine Band where the unit provided musical support to ceremonies around the nation's capital. It was additionally tasked with presidential support duties during World War II, and for this additional role, they were awarded the scarlet and gold breast cord by President Franklin Delano Roosevelt, which remains on the uniform today. When the war ended, the United States Drum and Bugle Corps resumed performing at various military and public ceremonies.

In the early 1950s, the unit gained considerable acclaim performing for an increasing number of civilian audiences. Originally their instrumentation was similar to the other drum and bugle corps of the era. It has evolved along with the civilian corps, adapting trends after they have become established by the civilian corps. Music composed specifically for their unique selection of instruments helped establish their reputation for excellence during this period. These factors also led to the unit's formal designation as "The Commandant's Own", a title noting their unique connection to the Commandant of the Marine Corps.

In 1968, Truman Crawford, formerly of the United States Air Force Drum and Bugle Corps, became a musical arranger and instructor for The Commandant's Own. During his 30-year career, he had a significant impact on the D&B comparable to that of John Philip Sousa on the United States Marine Band. The primary rehearsal hall of "The Commandant's Own" at Marine Barracks Washington is named Truman Crawford Hall in his honor.

=== History of the Commanding and Executive Officers ===
Year	Name
1949-1969	Chris G. Stergiou
1957-1973	Gary L. Losey
1973-1998	Truman W. Crawford
1984-1989	Melvin B. Estes
1988-1994	David C. Wolfe
1994-2010	Brent A. Harrison
1998-2014	Brian J. Dix
2010-2018	Christopher E. Hall
2015-2021	James D. Foley
2018-present	Nathan Morris
2019-present	Courtney R. Lawrence (Executive Officer)

=== History of the Drum Majors ===
Year	Name
1934-1960	Chris G. Stergiou
1953-1957	William O. Nickoff
1957-1967	Eugene S. Belschner
1961-1969	Gary L. Losey
1969-1972	Dennis E. Carroll
1972-1975	Rolland L. Henderson
1975-1978	Eric F. Bay
1978-1983	Michael J. Patri
1983-1989	Gary A. Petersen
1984-1989	James L. Marcil
1988-1997	Michael H. Gardner
1995-2000	James P. O'Keefe Jr.
2000-2009	Mark S. Miller
2001-2018	Kevin D. Buckles
2009-2018 (as Assistant Drum major); 2018-2025 (as Drum Major)	Keith G. Martinez
2016-2022 (as Assistant Drum Major); 2022-2026 (as Drum Major)	Joshua D. Dannemiller
2021-2026 (as Assistant Drum Major); 2026-present (as Drum Major)	David J. Cox
2026-present (Assistant Drum Major)	Christopher G. Walker

== Training ==
External videos
- Behind the Scenes: Drum Major Auditions
- Behind the Scenes: Hornline
- Behind the Scenes: Purcussion

Like the United States Marine Band, prior to enlisting each potential member of the Drum and Bugle Corps, all must pass a competitive audition. Unlike members of the President's Own, Drum and Bugle Corps members undergo Marine Corps Recruit Training and Marine Combat Training, where they are trained in basic infantry tactics.

Following Recruit Training and Marine Combat Training, Drum and Bugle Corps members proceed directly to Marine Barracks Washington for duty with "The Commandant's Own". They do not attend any additional Military Occupational Specialty training.

== Uniforms and instruments ==
The Marines of the United States Marine Drum & Bugle Corps wear red and white uniforms with white gauntlets which cover the wrists and bear and play brass instruments, marching drums, and various front ensemble instruments.

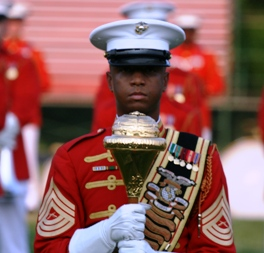
Master Sergeant Kevin D. Buckles, former Drum Major of the United States Marine Drum & Bugle Corps "The Commandant's Own" holding a ceremonial mace.

The brass instruments played by "The Commandant's Own" are bugles pitched in G. There are 4 sections within the hornline: Soprano Bugle, Mellophone Bugle, Baritone Bugle, and Contrabass Bugle. In January 2021 the unit transitioned from the two-valved models utilized by the Drum Corps for decades, to three-valved versions, allowing the brass section to play the complete chromatic scale. Formerly the D&B, as well as various unit bugle corps, also had fifers up til the 1940s.

== See also ==
- United States military bands
