= United States Marine Corps Silent Drill Platoon =

24-man rifle platoon

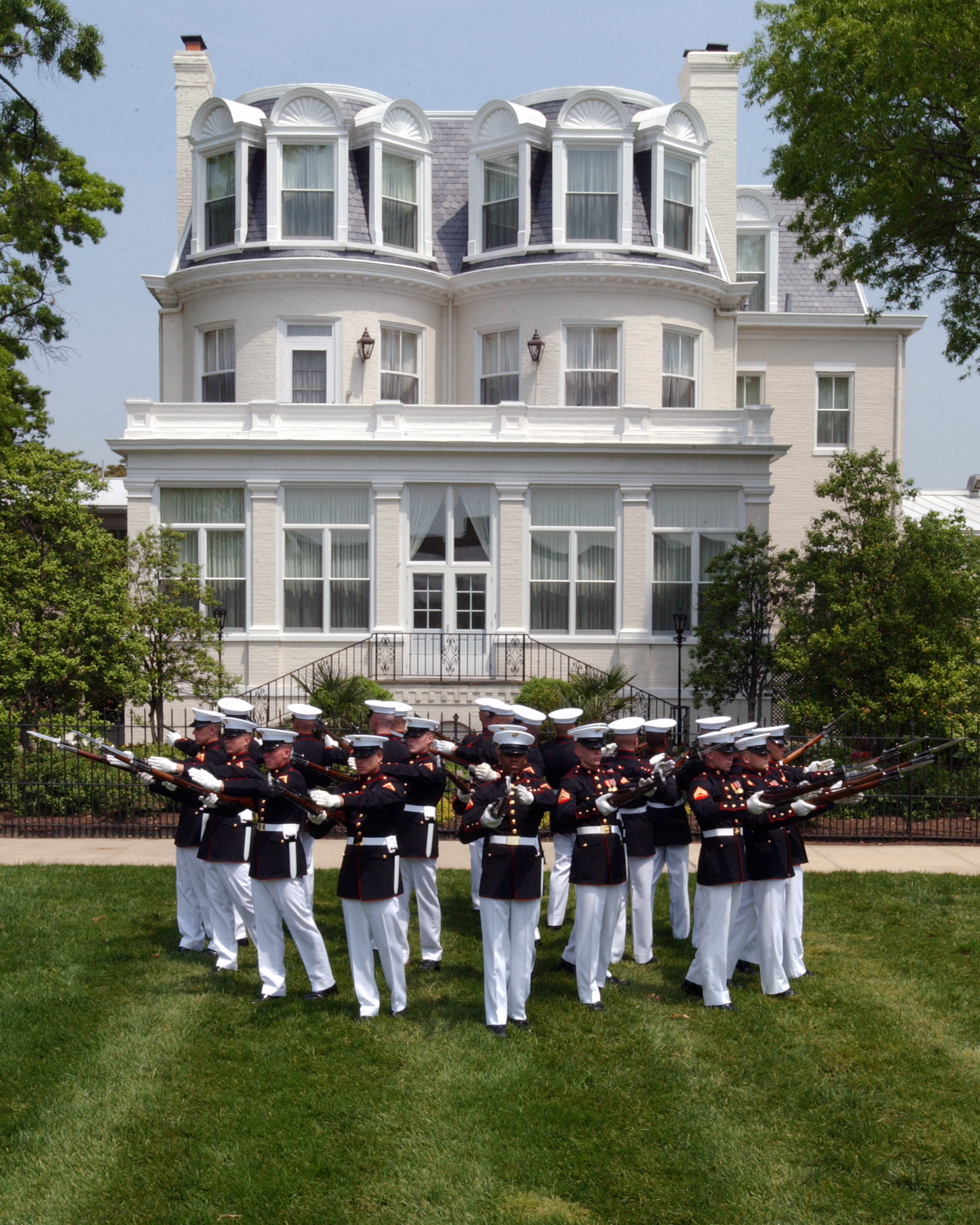
The Silent Drill Platoon performs in front of the home of the Commandant of the Marine Corps

The United States Marine Corps Silent Drill Platoon is a 24-man rifle platoon led by a Captain and Platoon Sergeant of the United States Marine Corps (USMC).

Often referred to as The Marching Twenty-Four, the unit performs a unique silent precision exhibition drill, without cadence, or verbal coordination. The purpose of the platoon is to exemplify the discipline and professionalism of the Marine Corps. The Silent Drill Platoon, which first performed in November 18, 1928, originally as a one-time show, received such an overwhelming response that it soon became part of the routine parades at Marine Barracks, Washington, D.C.

In 2022 Captain Kelsey M. Hastings became the first woman to command the Silent Drill Platoon.

== Drill movements ==
The Marines execute a series of calculated drill movements and precise handling of their hand-polished 10.5 pounds (4.8 kg) M1 Garand rifles with fixed bayonets. The routine concludes with a unique rifle inspection involving elaborate rifle spins and tosses. All drill movements are done with superfluous spins of the rifle, making the Silent Drill Platoon's drill unique from other Marine units' drill movements.

== Selection and training ==
Marines are selected from students at the two Schools of Infantry, located at Camp Pendleton, California and Camp Lejeune, North Carolina, from interviews conducted by barracks personnel.

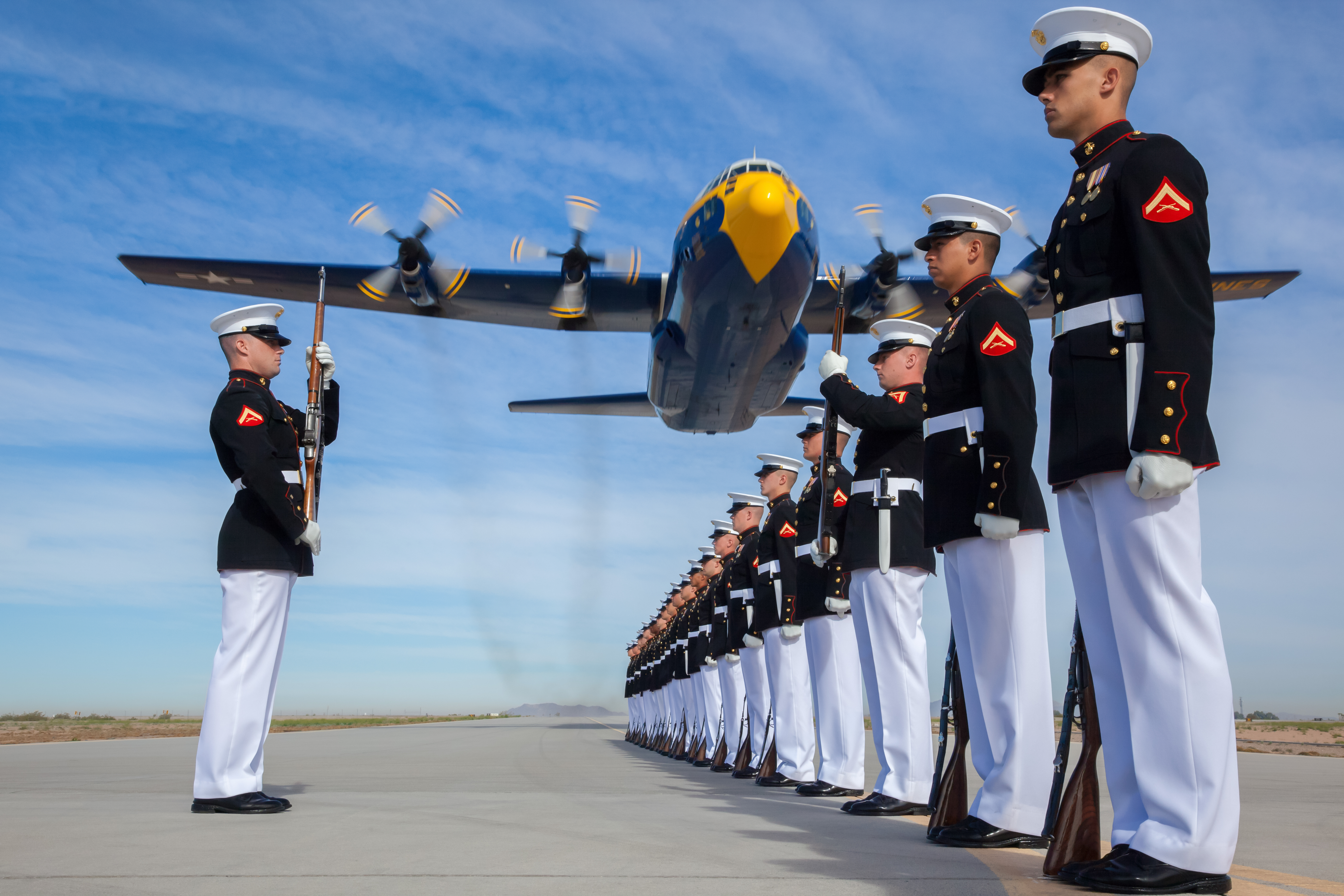
A U.S. Marine Corps C-130T Hercules aircraft with the Blue Angels, the Navy's flight demonstration squadron, flies over Marines with the Silent Drill Platoon at Marine Corps Air Station Yuma, Arizona.

Once selected, Marines are assigned to Marine Barracks, Washington, D.C., to serve up to a two-year ceremonial tour. Beyond their ceremonial duties, the Marines collaterally train in the field as infantrymen. Throughout the year, these Marines hone their infantry skills at the Marine Corps Combat Development Command in Marine Corps Base Quantico, Virginia and other bases. The Marines selected must be between 5'11" and 6'1" (180.3 and 185.4 cm) tall and be in the median of their weight requirements for their height. Uniformity is a key asset.

Experienced members of the Silent Drill Platoon, usually non-commissioned officers, have the opportunity to audition to become rifle inspectors. They must go through inspection tryouts graded by rifle inspectors of the previous year. Only two Marines who audition will become rifle inspectors.

Once the year's Silent Drill Platoon members are selected, they begin their training in Washington, and continue to train at Marine Corps Air Station Yuma, Arizona, perfecting their routine year-round. Throughout the year, they perform at Marine Barracks, Washington, D.C., and at numerous events across the United States, and also represent the Marine Corps abroad.

=== Evolution of the Rifle Inspectors overs the past years (since 1928) ===
Year	Number No. 1 Rifle Inspector	Number No. 2 Rifle Inspector
1985	Chris D. Boyd	Brad A. Compton
1999	Joe A. Almendarez	Roupen Bastajian
2005	Roberto Cruz	Jamar Bailey
2006	Shawn Ballard	???
2007	Ray Franklin	James Sinovich
2008	Anthony Hill	Joshua Leuthold
2009	Kevin Courtney	Jeremy Miller
2010	Joshua Burke	Nicholas Meekins
2011	Michael Hintz	Oscar Franquez
2012	Carlton Williams	Ryan McKinley
2013	Tyler Dutton	Sean Breheny
2014	James Schulz	Peter Eleey
2015	Clarence Guilianelli	Aaron Becker
2016	Jace Randall	Brandon Peplinski
2017	Jarris Wade	Jesse Thorton
2018	Ryan Watkins	Christopher Ochoa
2019	Hunter Smart	Jose Soto
2020	James Jorgensen	Jordan Shields
2021	Xavier Cockrell	Albert Albillar
2022	Steven Almaguer	Blake Behrens
2023	Hugh Seaton	William Buffington x2
2024	Gerald Wells III	Joseph Crawhorn
2025	Cameron Holmes	Nash Davis
2026	Jacob Dobromirescu	Quinton Greeson
