= Master gunnery sergeant =

US Marine Corps enlisted grade

Master Gunnery Sergeant
- Master Gunnery Sergeant insignia
- Country: United States
- Service branch: United States Marine Corps
- Abbreviation: MGySgt
- NATO rank code: OR-9
- Pay grade: E-9
- Formation: 1958
- Next lower rank: Master sergeant
- Equivalent ranks: Sergeant major

Master gunnery sergeant (MGySgt) is the 9th and highest technical enlisted grade in the United States Marine Corps. Master gunnery sergeants are staff non-commissioned officers (SNCOs) with the pay grade of E-9. As E-9s, they serve from 15 to 30 years, and advise commanders on technical subjects relating to their occupational specialty. (Sergeant Major is also at the E-9 pay grade with duties related to discipline, morale, and command-level administration.)

== History ==
The grade was derived from another grade unique to the United States Marine Corps, the gunnery sergeant, and has been in use (though not continuously) since the time of the Spanish–American War (April 25 – August 12, 1898).

The rank of Master Gunnery Sergeant as well as Platoon Sergeant first came into being in the Marine Corps in the Northern Autumn of 1935. The insignia featured the bursting bomb and crossed rifles of the gunnery sergeant rank between its three chevrons and three rockers.

Establishment of the grade in its current form and pay grade occurred during a sweeping reorganization of grades in 1958 and 1959. The grade was included, along with the grade of Master Sergeant, in a new career path for the pay grades of E-8 and E-9 which allowed senior SNCO billets to be filled by occupational specialists. This move was designed to officially acknowledge the ever-increasing complexity of modern warfare, while still keeping the First Sergeant and sergeant major career paths with their historic command emphasis intact. (During and prior to World War II, this was reversed; the sergeant major at the time was an administrative position, while the master gunnery sergeant was part of the S-3 section and enforced discipline.)

== See also ==
- Comparative military ranks
- Military rank
- Sergeant
- United States Marine Corps rank insignia
