= Non-Commissioned Officer in Charge =

Junior command position in a military unit

The designation Noncommissioned Officer in Charge, usually abbreviated to NCOIC (or NCO I/C), signifies an individual in the enlisted ranks of a military unit who has limited command authority over others in the unit.

An example would be a squad leader who may have 6-12 people under their command. Another might be a platoon sergeant who can have 45-70 people under their command.

Generally, an NCOIC is both an administrative leader as well as a combat leader.

Only NCOs and SNCOs may serve as NCOICs. In the United States Air Force enlisted members in the grades of E-1 through E-4 cannot hold the position or title of NCOIC until promoted to the grade of E-5 and above.

== See also ==
- Non-commissioned officer
- Staff Noncommissioned Officer
- Senior Enlisted Advisor
