= Gunnery sergeant =

Military rank in the United States

- Gunnery sergeant insignia (Blue Dress)

- Gunnery sergeant insignia (Khaki Shirts)

- Gunnery sergeant insignia (Service Dress)
- Country: United States
- Service branch: United States Marine Corps
- Abbreviation: GySgt
- Rank group: Non-commissioned officer
- NATO rank code: OR-7
- Pay grade: E-7
- Formation: March 3, 1899; 127 years ago
- Next higher rank: Master sergeant First sergeant
- Next lower rank: Staff sergeant
- Equivalent ranks: Sergeant first class (USA); Chief petty officer (USN & USCG); Master sergeant (USAF & USSF)

Gunnery sergeant (GySgt) is the seventh enlisted rank in the United States Marine Corps, above staff sergeant and below master sergeant and first sergeant, and is a staff non-commissioned officer (SNCO). It has a pay grade of E-7. Gunnery sergeants are commonly referred by the nickname "Gunny".

The gunnery sergeant insignia consists of two M1 Garands centered vertically between three chevrons and two rockers.

== Responsibilities ==
Gunnery sergeants in infantry units typically serve in the billet of "company gunnery sergeant" or as the platoon sergeant of 23–69 Marines in a reconnaissance platoon or a crew-served weapons platoon (i.e., machine guns, mortars, assault weapons/rockets, and anti-tank missiles). In artillery batteries, gunnery sergeants serve as the "battery gunnery sergeant" in the headquarters section of the firing battery's 94-member firing platoon. In tank and assault amphibian units gunnery sergeants may serve as a platoon sergeant of a 16-member platoon of four tanks or a 39-member platoon of 12 amphibious assault vehicles (AAVs), respectively. Tank and assault amphibian gunnery sergeants are also assigned as section leaders, in charge of either two tanks and 8 Marines or three AAVs and 9 Marines. Gunnery sergeants serving as platoon sergeants perform essentially the same duties as staff sergeant platoon sergeants, with the additional responsibility of supervising other staff non-commissioned officers (i.e., the gunnery/staff sergeants leading the organic sections of the platoon).

The company/battery gunnery sergeant serves as the unit's operations chief and works with the executive officer to plan and coordinate unit training and operations. In combat, as a member of the unit's command group, he/she serves as a tactical adviser to the commanding officer/battery commander regarding employment of the unit and assists in operating the command post or tactical operations center. In garrison, he/she is responsible to the company/battery commander for supervising and coordinating individual training for the enlisted members of the company or battery and may assist the company/battery first sergeant in the administration and non-tactical leadership of the unit and by supervising the property (logistics) NCO, advising the officers, mentoring subordinate ranking Marines, and performing other duties as assigned. The company/battery gunnery sergeant has been described as a "hands on disciplinarian". An approximate former equivalent in the United States Army would have been "field first sergeant".

Gunnery sergeants also serve as senior staff non-commissioned officers in military staff sections and headquarters and service companies and headquarters batteries at battalion/squadron, regiment/group, and division/wing headquarters levels.

In Command Element, Combat Logistics Element, and Aviation Combat Element organizations, gunnery sergeants serve in basically similar positions of responsibility, authority, and accountability as their Ground Combat Element counterparts, with perhaps slightly different titles, such as Division/Branch Chief/NCOIC or Department SNCOIC (Staff Non-Commissioned Officer-In-Charge) in the aircraft maintenance department of a Marine aircraft squadron.

== History and insignia ==
The rank of gunnery sergeant in the Marine Corps was established by the Navy personnel act of March 3, 1899 (30 Stat. 1009) reflecting the duties of Marines in ship's detachments. The original insignia was three chevrons point up with three straight "ties" with an insignia of a bursting bomb over a crossed rifle and naval gun. From 1904 to 1929 the insignia went to three stripes only over a bursting bomb on top of crossed rifles. In 1929, like the rank of first sergeant, two "rockers" were added beneath the stripes with the same insignia in the middle. In 1937 the middle insignia was dropped.

In December 1946, the Marine Corps eliminated the rank of gunnery sergeant, merging it with five other ranks into technical sergeant, at the second highest pay grade of E-2. Another reorganization of the ranks in 1958 restored gunnery sergeant to the rank structure.

== See also ==
- List of comparative military ranks
- United States Marine Corps rank insignia
