= Culture of the United States Marine Corps =

The culture of the United States Marine Corps is widely varied but unique amongst the branches of the United States Armed Forces. Because members of the Marine Corps are drawn from across the United States (and resident aliens from other nations), it is as varied as each individual Marine but tied together with core values and traditions passed from generation to generation of Marines. As in any military organization, the official and unofficial traditions of the Marine Corps serve to reinforce camaraderie and set the service apart from others. The Corps' embracement of its rich culture and history is cited as a reason for its high esprit de corps.

== Official traditions and customs ==
Many traditions and customs of the United States Marine Corps are officially recognized through orders, histories, and ceremonies; some are even embodied within the uniform.

=== Core values ===
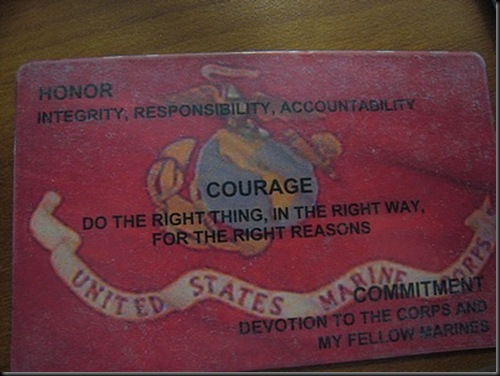
Card given to recruits bearing the Core values

The Marine Corps core values of honor, courage, and commitment have gained increased prominence in recent years. As an emphasis on performing morally on and off duty, the concept of core values has infiltrated into many aspects of Marine life, beginning in recruit training and continuing into combat. This "warrior ethos" provides guidance to Marines in difficult ethical situations and acts as a reminder to provide good order and discipline.

=== Marines' Hymn ===
The Marines' Hymn dates back to 1919 and is the oldest official song in the United States Armed Forces. It embraces some of the most important battles of the Corps at that time, including Chapultepec and Derna. Subtle changes and unofficial verses have been added as the history of the Corps has advanced.

=== Eagle, Globe, and Anchor ===
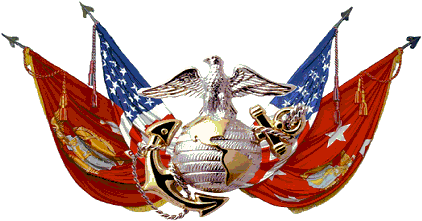
A rendition of the emblem on the flag of the U.S. Marine Corps

The official Marine Corps emblem is the Eagle, Globe, and Anchor (EGA). Adopted in its present form in 1868 by Commandant Jacob Zeilin, it derives partially from ornaments worn by the Continental Marines and the British Royal Marines. The original eagle was a crested eagle found in the Americas, not the bald eagle that appears in the current emblem. The eagle stands on the Western Hemisphere and holds in its beak a scroll bearing the motto "Semper Fidelis", though the scroll is sometimes omitted from uniform insignia. An anchor fouled with rope stands behind the globe, and while it generally points to the viewer's left, it can be found reversed when paired so that the anchors continually face the other. The eagle stands for a proud country, the globe signifies worldwide service, and the fouled anchor signifies naval tradition. The use of the emblem became official when the seal was adopted in 1955.

=== Seal and colors ===
United States Marine Corps seal

On 22 June 1954, President Dwight D. Eisenhower signed an executive order which approved the design of an official seal for the United States Marine Corps. The seal had been designed by Felix de Weldon at the request, and with the assistance, of the Commandant Lemuel C. Shepherd, Jr.

The seal consists of the EGA emblem in bronze; however, a bald eagle replaced the crested eagle depicted on the 1868 emblem and is depicted with wings displayed, standing upon the western hemisphere of the terrestrial globe and holding in his beak a scroll inscribed with the Marine Corps motto "Semper Fidelis" with the hemisphere superimposed on a fouled anchor. The seal is displayed on a scarlet background encircled with a navy blue band edged in a gold rope rim and inscribed "Department of the Navy, United States Marine Corps" in gold letters.

Coincident with the approval of this seal by the president, EGA centered on the seal was adopted in 1955 as the official Marine Corps Emblem. The blue signifies naval ties, while the scarlet and gold are the official Marine Corps colors. They appear ubiquitously in the Marine Corps, particularly on signage. They also form the base colors of the flag of the United States Marine Corps.

=== Motto ===
Semper Fidelis March
John Philip Sousa's "Semper Fidelis March", performed by the U.S. Marine Band in June 1909.

The Marine motto "Semper Fidelis" means "always faithful" in Latin. This motto often appears in the shortened form "Semper Fi" /ˌsɛmpər ˈfaɪ/. It is also the name of the official march of the Corps, composed by John Philip Sousa. It was adopted in 1883 when Commandant Charles McCawley added it to the seal, before which the traditional mottos were "Fortitudine" (With Fortitude); "By Sea and by Land", a translation of the Royal Marines' "Per Mare, Per Terram"; and "To the Shores of Tripoli", which was later revised to "From the Halls of the Montezumas to the Shores of Tripoli" and formed the first lines of the Marines' Hymn.

The recruiting slogan of "A Few Good Men" (as opposed to the play and film) derives from a Continental Marines recruiting poster:

The Continental ship Providence, now lying at Boston, is bound on a short cruise, immediately; a few good men are wanted to make up her complement." (Marine Captain William Jones, Providence Gazette, 20 March 1779.)

The modern recruiting slogan is "the few, the proud, the Marines." The Rifleman's Creed is a similar concept as the motto but offers a more modern look at doctrine. It explains to a recruit the importance of their weapon but also emphasizes the moral motivations behind using it. Though the Marines have a lot of mottos and slogans, their unofficial slogan is, "Improvise, Adapt, and Overcome." They are trained with this slogan to be able to deal with all obstacles and serious situations they must face.

=== Swords ===
Two styles of swords are worn by Marines. The Marine Corps officers' sword is a Mameluke sword, similar to the Persian shamshir presented to Leuitenant Presley O'Bannon after the Battle of Derna during the First Barbary War. After its adoption in 1825 and initial distribution in 1826, Mameluke swords have been worn by Marine officers ever since, except during the period 1859–1875, when they were required to wear the Army's Model 1850 Foot Officers' Sword. Upon returning to the traditional sword, many officers gave their Army swords to their senior non-commissioned officer (NCO), creating the basis for the NCO sword. Generally, Marines are the only branch where enlisted members regularly carry a sword (the Army authorizes platoon and first sergeants to carry a Model 1840 sword during some ceremonies, while the Chief of Naval Operations authorized chief petty officers and above to carry an optional ceremonial cutlass with dress uniforms in 2010).

=== Birthday ===
The Marine Corps birthday is celebrated every year on 10 November, when on this date in 1775, the Second Continental Congress raised two battalions of Marines. Tun Tavern is regarded as the location of the first Marines to enlist under Commandant Samuel Nicholas. Prior to 1921, Marines celebrated the 11 July 1798 recreation of the Corps (it having been disbanded following the end of the Revolutionary War) with little fanfare. Then, Marine Corps Order 47 was published by Commandant John A. Lejeune:

MARINE CORPS ORDERS

No. 47 (Series 1921) HEADQUARTERS U.S. MARINE CORPS Washington, November 1, 1921

759. The following will be read to the command on the 10th of November, 1921, and hereafter on the 10th of November of every year. Should the order not be received by the 10th of November, 1921, it will be read upon receipt.

1. On November 10, 1775, a Corps of Marines was created by a resolution of Continental Congress. Since that date many thousand men have borne the name "Marine". In memory of them it is fitting that we who are Marines should commemorate the birthday of our corps by calling to mind the glories of its long and illustrious history.
2. The record of our corps is one which will bear comparison with that of the most famous military organizations in the world's history. During 90 of the 146 years of its existence the Marine Corps has been in action against the Nation's foes. From the Battle of Trenton to the Argonne, Marines have won foremost honors in war, and in the long eras of tranquility at home, generation after generation of Marines have grown gray in war in both hemispheres and in every corner of the seven seas, that our country and its citizens might enjoy peace and security.
3. In every battle and skirmish since the birth of our corps, Marines have acquitted themselves with the greatest distinction, winning new honors on each occasion until the term "Marine" has come to signify all that is highest in military efficiency and soldierly virtue.
4. This high name of distinction and soldierly repute we who are Marines today have received from those who preceded us in the corps. With it we have also received from them the eternal spirit which has animated our corps from generation to generation and has been the distinguishing mark of the Marines in every age. So long as that spirit continues to flourish Marines will be found equal to every emergency in the future as they have been in the past, and the men of our Nation will regard us as worthy successors to the long line of illustrious men who have served as "soldiers of the Sea" since the founding of the Corps.

JOHN A. LEJEUNE, Major General Commandant

75705--21

The celebrations were formalized by Commandant Lemuel C. Shepherd, Jr. in 1952, outlining the cake cutting ceremony, which would enter the Marine Drill Manual in 1956. By tradition, the first slice of cake is given to the oldest Marine present, who in turn hands it off to the youngest Marine present, symbolizing the old and experienced Marines passing their knowledge to the new generation of Marines. Lejeune's message is also republished annually.

=== Drill and ceremonies ===
Close Order Drill is heavily emphasized early on in a Marine's training. Formal ceremonies, such as the Marine Corps Birthday Ball, a change of command, or a retirement, will almost always incorporate some form of close order drill. The Marine Corps uses close order drill to teach discipline by instilling habits of precision and automatic response to orders, increase the confidence of junior officers and noncommissioned officers through the exercise of command and give Marines an opportunity to handle individual weapons.

The Mess Night is a borrowed tradition of ceremonial dining. Originally a British Army tradition, it has become an honored tradition of enjoying drink, good food, and fellowship with a Marine's comrades, as well as honoring those who have perished in battle.

Except for the annual celebration of the Marine Corps Birthday, no social function associated with the smaller of America's naval services is more enjoyed, admired and imitated than the mess night."

=== History ===
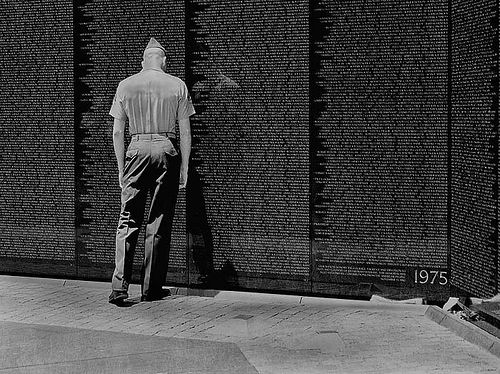
Marine at the Vietnam Veterans Memorial

Marines hold a reverence for their history, The History Division, a sub-unit of the Training and Education Command, records, archives, researches, analyzes, and presents the history of the Corps.

Several Marine Corps museums have been established, most notably the National Museum of the Marine Corps at Marine Corps Base Quantico, Virginia. Additional Marine history can be found at the Flying Leatherneck Aviation Museum, the MCRD San Diego Command Museum, the Marine Corps Air-Ground Museum, the Marine Corps Legacy Museum, the Parris Island Museum, the WWII/Korea LVT Museum, and the Waterhouse Museum.

Memorials also serve as a way to preserve history. One of the most iconic memorials is the Marine Corps War Memorial in Arlington National Cemetery, a statue recreated from the iconic photo Raising the Flag on Iwo Jima. Other memorials to Marines (sometimes including other services) include two of the many statues named Iron Mike (Belleau, France and Parris Island, South Carolina), the USS Arizona Memorial, Navy–Marine Corps Memorial Stadium at the United States Naval Academy, as well as many period specific military memorial around the country where Marines participated in fighting, such as the National World War II Memorial and the Vietnam Veterans Memorial.

== Unofficial traditions and customs ==
The Corps has many unofficial traditions, promulgated by many Marines and some Marine-based organizations (such as the Marine Corps League, Marine Corps Association, and Young Marines) or media (such as the Marine Corps Gazette, Leatherneck Magazine, or Marine Corps Times). Each service refers to their servicemembers differently (e.g., Army has soldiers, Navy has sailors, Air Force has airmen, Space Force has guardians). Although "soldiers" (and to a lesser extent, "sailors") are thought to be a catch-all for servicemembers, servicemembers in the Marine Corps are referred to as "Marines".

=== Nicknames ===
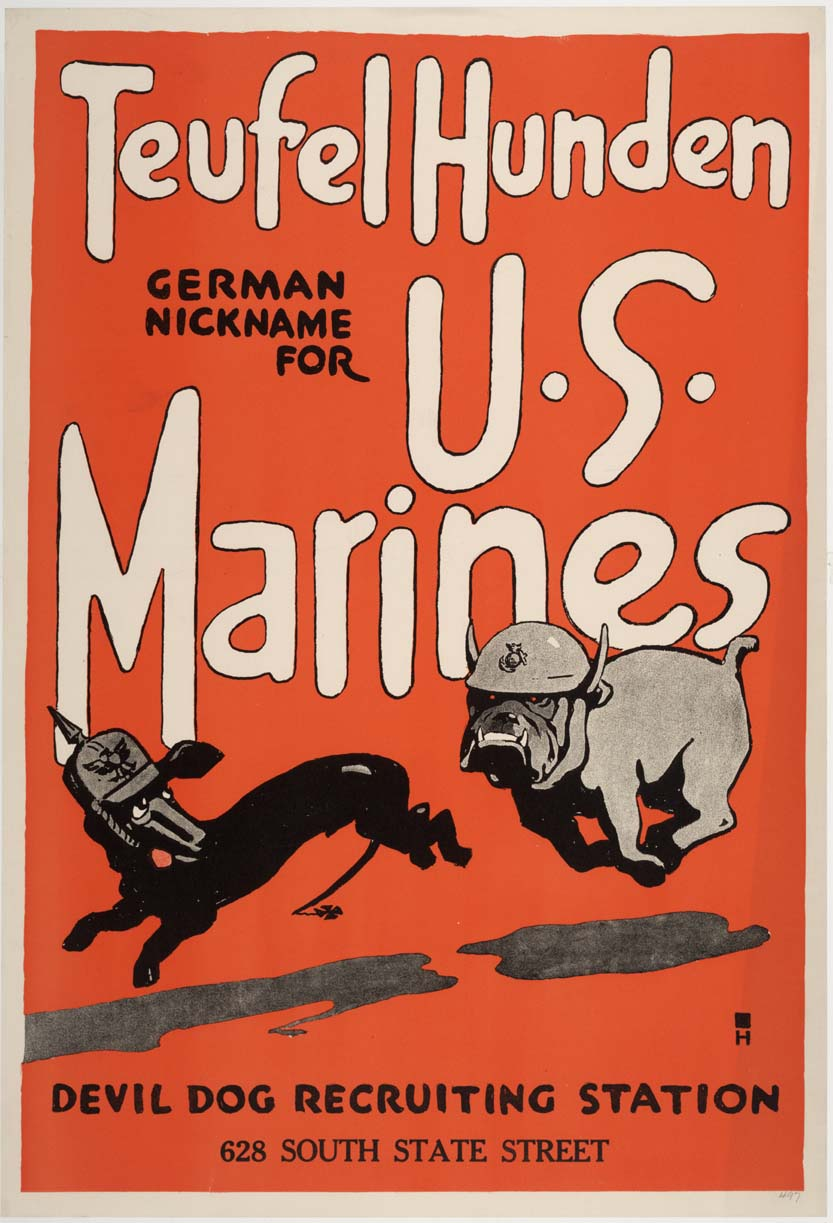
A recruiting poster makes use of the "Teufel Hunden" nickname.

Marines have been given many generic nicknames:

- Devil Dog is an oft-disputed term. Most Marines learn that the term comes from "Teufel Hunden", a corrupted version of the German "Teufelshunde" awarded to Marines after the Battle of Belleau Wood. The German high command classified Marines as stormtrooper-quality elite troops. The bulldog has been closely associated with the Marine Corps as a result, and some units keep one as a mascot. Despite the proud history of the nickname, internally it is often used in a dismissive manner from senior NCOs towards junior Marines during verbal reprimanding or assigning of menial tasks. Generally this takes place in the form of "Hey Devil Dog" followed by the reprimand or menial task. The practice has been so deeply established that the nickname is sometimes perceived as an insult when used within the organization.
- Jarhead has several oft-disputed explanations, including how the "high and tight" haircut allows the head to resemble a jar lid, as well as pejoratives about empty heads. However, the term "jarhead" was well established in the 1950s, while the term "high and tight" did not yet exist; Marines who chose to trim their hair closely on the sides were said to have "white sidewalls."
- Gyrene has dropped out of popular use and is speculated to be a portmanteau of GI and Marine.
- Leatherneck refers to a stiff leather collar used to protect the neck from slashing blades that was formerly part of the Marine uniform during the Revolutionary War period.

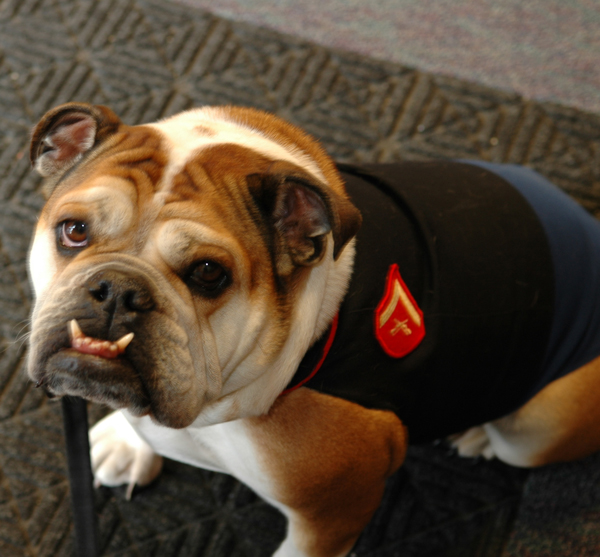
A bulldog mascot

- Crayon-eater is a self-deprecating term originating in the 2010s, playing on a stereotype of Marines being unintelligent by imagining Marines who eat crayons and drink glue.

=== Mottos and battle cries ===
- Oorah is a common battle cry among Marines, being similar in function and purpose to the Army, Air Force, and Space Force's hooah and the Navy's hooyah cries (to include an affirmative, a display of enthusiasm, and a greeting). Many possible etymologies have been offered for the term.
- Semper Fi, Mac was a common form of greeting in times past.
- Gung-ho became a common slogan; from Chinese gōnghé, "China Marines" took it to mean 'work together' and used it during World War II.
- Improvise, Adapt and Overcome has become an adopted mantra in many units
- Semper Gumby is a play on semper flexibilis. Purported to mean "always flexible", the true Latin translation is semper flexibilis; "gumby" is taken from the cartoon character Gumby. Semper Gumby is also popular among Navy personnel.

=== Veteran Marines ===
("Once a Marine, always a Marine.")

- "Veteran Marine" or "Prior service Marine" can refer to anyone who has been discharged honorably from the Corps.
- "Retired Marine" refers to those who have completed 20 or more years of service and formally retired or have been medically retired after less than 20 years service.
- According to one of the "Commandant's White letters" from General Alfred M. Gray, Jr., referring to a Marine by their last earned rank is appropriate.
- Marines that have left service with a less than full honorable discharge might still be considered Marines (depending on the view of the individual), however that title is also in keeping with a stigma, and many will avoid the issue altogether by addressing the individual by name with no other title.

=== Physical fitness and martial arts ===
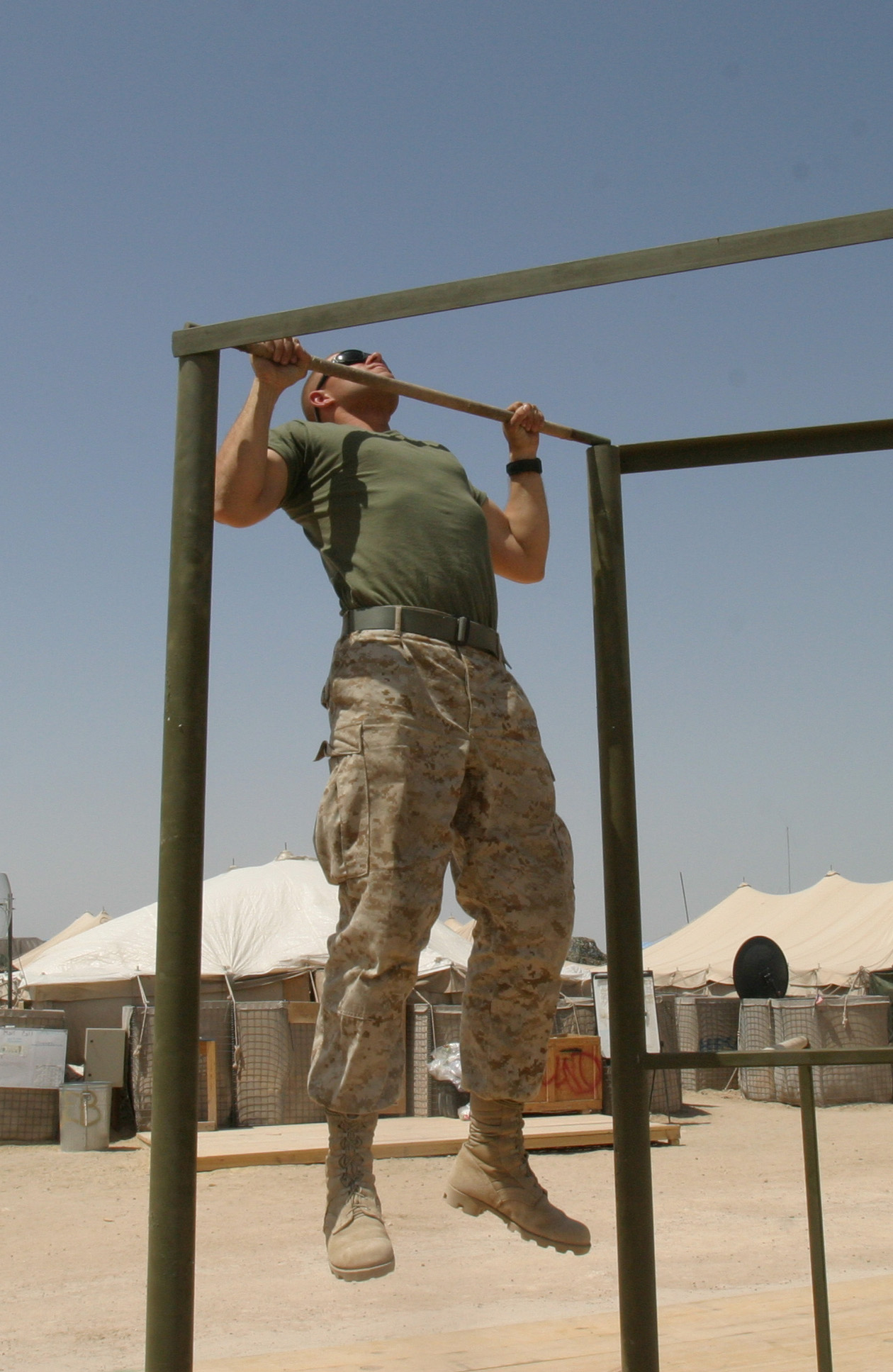
A Marine performs pull-ups

The Marine Corps places a high institutional value on physical readiness, preparing the individual's body for the rigors of combat. Mandatory participation in three hours weekly of physical exercise, termed "physical training" or PT, is considered a minimum starting point; further fitness is rewarded by better evaluation scores, which increase promotability, as well as benefits for winning athletic competitions. In addition, height and weight standards and body fat percentage ensure that Marines are fit and present a good military appearance. Chronic lack of physical fitness can be grounds for administrative punishment and even discharge in extreme situations. The Physical Fitness Test and Combat Fitness Test are performed annually to assess a Marine's fitness, and higher scores weigh in their favor for promotions. To encourage physical training, Commandant James T. Conway authorized a new physical training uniform based on a tracksuit and the development of the Combat Fitness Test to better simulate the specific stressors of combat.

For decades, Marines learned a variety of martial arts and other methods of hand-to-hand combat, but these were irregular processes that varied greatly between units and eras. Eventually, the Corps solidified its various teachings into the LINE combat system, but its inherent inflexibility was evident. In 2001, the Marine Corps initiated a program called Marine Corps Martial Arts Program (MCMAP). Because of an expectation that urban and police-type peacekeeping missions would become more common in the 21st century, placing Marines in even closer contact with unarmed civilians, MCMAP was implemented to provide Marines with a larger and more versatile set of less-than-lethal options for controlling hostile but unarmed individuals. It is also a stated aim of the program to instill and maintain the "warrior ethos" within Marines. The Marine Corps Martial Arts program is an eclectic mix of different styles of martial arts melded together and consists of boxing movements, joint locking techniques, opponent weight transfer, ground grappling, bayonet, knife and baton fighting, non-compliance joint manipulations, and blood restriction chokes. Marines begin MCMAP training in boot camp, earning the first of five belts.

== Marines in the public eye ==
The Marine Corps, like any other branch of the military, is most visible by the public through public affairs organizations and several presentation units. Dedication to proficiency in drill is a hallmark of the Silent Drill Platoon, Marine Band, and the Drum and Bugle Corps. In addition, the Corps released periodic recruiting commercials, often about one annually. The traditional tagline for the commercials is "The Few, The Proud, The Marines." While Marines do not have installations across the United States (unlike the Army and Air Force, Marine installations are concentrated in California, North Carolina, and the national capitol region), the direct link for most Americans to the Corps is the Marine recruiter, often recognizable in the Dress Blue uniform.

Marines make popular subjects for works of fiction. The Marine Corps has been depicted on many films, television shows, innumerable books, and even video games. Much of the Marines image is the result of carefully crafted public relations; President Harry S. Truman said the Marines have "a propaganda machine that is almost equal to Stalin's."

Since 2001, Gallup polls have asked "Which of the four major branches of the armed forces are the most prestigious?" Every year of the Gallup poll has shown that the American public regards the Corps as the most prestigious of the four branches of the armed forces of the Department of Defense. However, when ranked by importance, it did not score well until it tied the Army and Air Force in 2004, with the increase being attributed to the Iraq War.

== See also ==
- Culture of the United States
- List of U.S. Marine Corps acronyms and expressions
