= Hurrah (disambiguation) =

Hurrah, originally Huzzah, is an exclamation.

Hurrah may refer to:

- Hurrah, Florida, also known as Picnic, a small town in Florida, U.S.
- Hurrah!, British jangle pop band
- Hurrah (nightclub), a former New York City nightclub
- Hurrah Pass, a mountain pass in Utah, U.S.
- Hurrah (film), a 1998 Australian film

== See also ==
- Hip Hip Hurray (disambiguation)
- The Last Hurrah (disambiguation)
- Hooah, a U.S. Army battle cry
- Hooyah, a U.S. Navy battle cry
- Oorah (Marines), a U.S. Marine Corps battle cry
