= Hoorah =

Hoorah may refer to:

- Oorah (battle cry), a battle cry common in the United States Marine Corps since the mid-20th century
- An exclamation similar to Huzzah
