= MCRD =

MCRD may refer to:

- Marine Corps Recruit Depot Parris Island, South Carolina, United States
- Marine Corps Recruit Depot San Diego, California, United States
  - MCRD San Diego Command Museum
