= Amrit Sanskar =

One of the four Sikh Sanskars

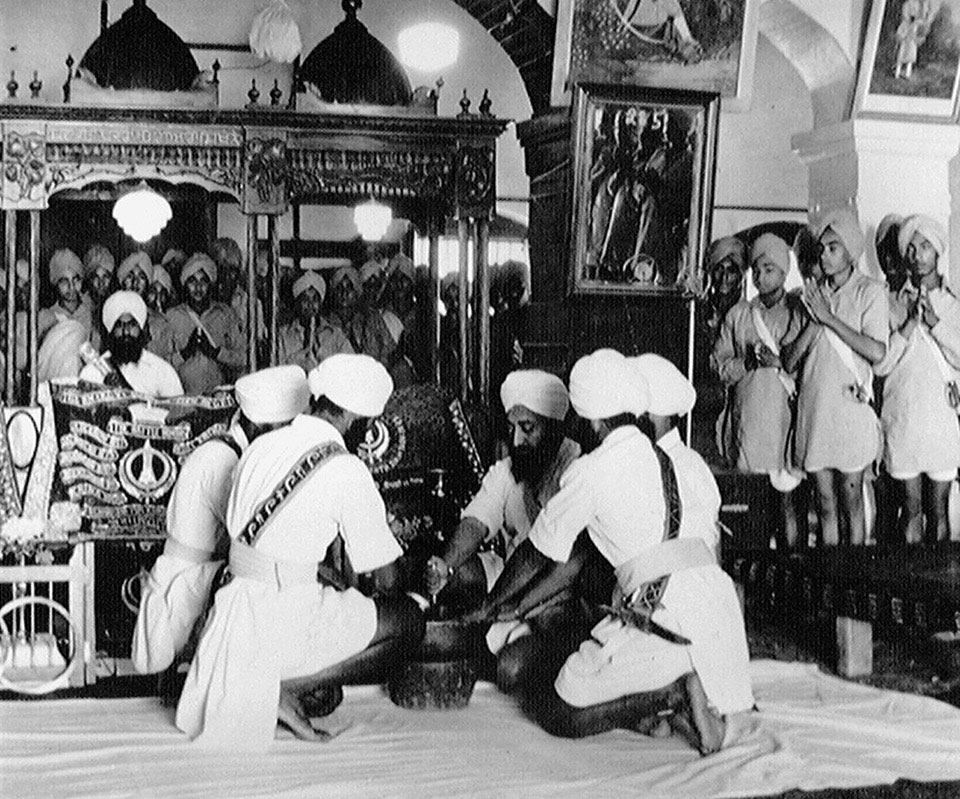
Photograph of the Sikh religious initiation ceremony ("Khande-di-Pahul") for new recruits to the Sikh Regiment, 1947

Amrit Sanskar (Punjabi: ਅੰਮ੍ਰਿਤ ਸੰਸਕਾਰ, romanized: Amrita sansakāra, pronunciation: [ãːmɾʱɪt̪ sә̃nskäːɚ], lit. "nectar ceremony") is one of the four Sikh Sanskars. The Amrit Sanskar is the initiation rite introduced by Guru Gobind Singh when he founded the Khalsa in 1699.

A Sikh who has been initiated into the Khalsa ('pure'; the Sikh brotherhood) is considered to be Amritdhari (baptised, lit. 'amrit taker') or Khalsa ('pure'). Those who undergo initiation are expected to dedicate themselves to Waheguru (Almighty God) and work toward the establishment of the Khalsa Raj.

== Names ==
The Amrit Sanskar ceremony has many alternative names, such as Amrit Parchar, Amrit Sanchar, Khande di Pahul, Khande Batte di Pahul (Punjabi: ਖੰਡੇ ਬਾਟੇ ਦੀ ਪਾਹੁਲ, romanized: Khaḍē bāṭē dī pāhula), or khande-baate da amrit.

== History ==
=== Charan-Pahul ===
The original Sikh initiation ceremony, ever since the guruship period of Guru Nanak, was known as Charan-Pahul (Punjabi: ਚਰਨ-ਪਾਹੁਲ, romanized: Carana-pāhula), Pagpahul, or Charan Amrit (Punjabi: ਚਰਨਾਮ੍ਰਿਤ, romanized: Caranāmrita, lit. 'elixir of the feet'). It involved pouring water over the toes of the Sikh guru and the initiates drinking that water. If the guru was not present in a certain area, water would be poured over the toes of the masand or sangatia responsible for the area of that particular manji (early Sikh religious administrative unit) and the initiates would drink that water instead. If neither the guru or a local religious head is present, such as in a distant or tiny community of Sikhs, then the initiate would dip their toe in water and the local congregation would drink it. This initiation ceremony finds mention in the Vaaran authored by Bhai Gurdas. The ceremony was a way of showing the humbleness of initiates to the faith. This practice continued until 1699, when it was replaced by Guru Gobind Singh's innovation.

According to the Dabestan-e Mazaheb, the 'sahlang' term referred to person(s) initiated into the Sikh religion by a masand, who acted as representatives on behalf of the Sikh gurus. Such Sikhs were termed as meli or masandia, and were differentiated from Sikhs who had received their initiation rites directly from a Sikh guru, whom were termed as Khalsa.

=== Khande-di-Pahul ===
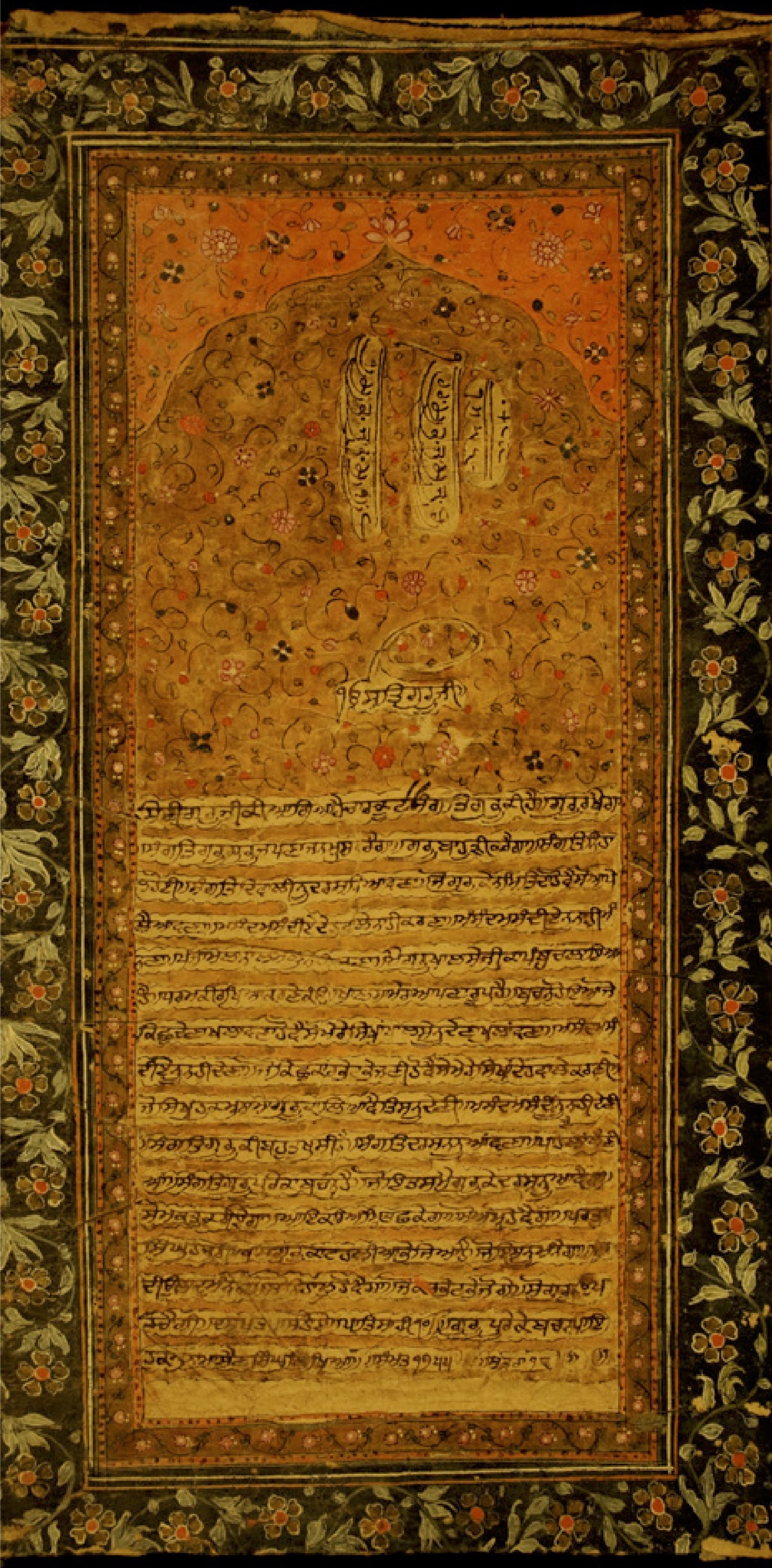
1698 hukamnama of Guru Gobind Singh with signature. The scribe is Bhai Saihna Singh. It orders all Sikhs to take Khande Ki Pahul and become Khalsa, avoid Minas, and recognize the Khalsa as the Guru's form. This hukamnama alludes to the idea of the ceremony and Khalsa predating its formalization as part of Sikh orthodoxy and orthopraxy in Anandpur in 1699.

Amrit Sanchar was formally initiated in 1699 when Gobind Singh established the order of the Khalsa at Anandpur Sahib. The day is now celebrated as Vaisakhi. This tradition had come to replace the prior Sikh initiation ceremony, in which the initiate would drink water that the Guru or a masand (designated official representing the Guru) had dipped his foot in.

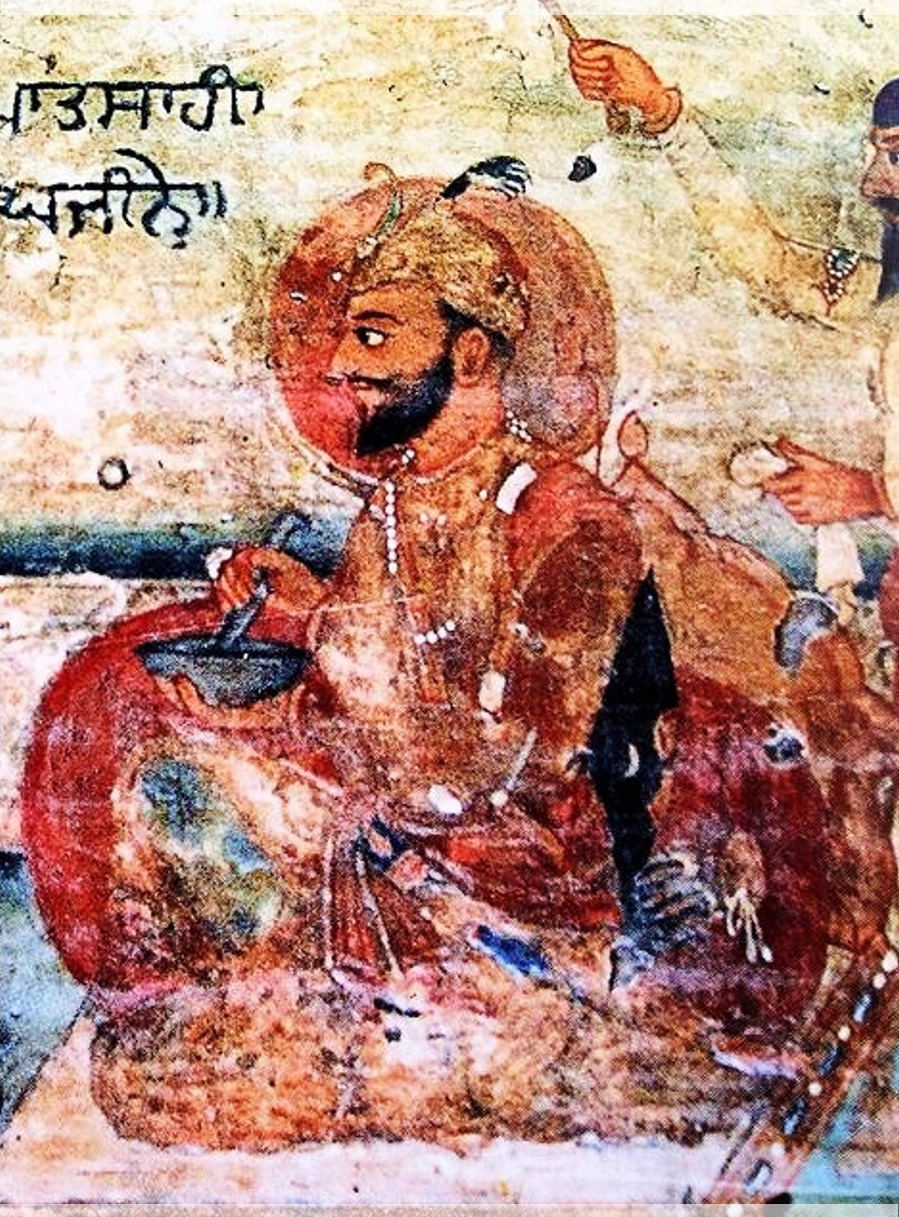
Sikh fresco from the original Akal Takht, Amritsar, of Guru Gobind Singh preparing Amrit, circa 19th century

Guru Gobind Singh addressed the congregation from the entryway of a tent pitched on a hill (now called Kesgarh Sahib). He drew his sword and asked for a volunteer who was willing to sacrifice his head. No one answered his first call, nor the second call, but on the third invitation, a man by the name of Daya Ram (later to be known as Daya Singh) came forward and offered his head to the Guru. Guru Gobind Singh took the volunteer inside the tent, and emerged shortly, with blood dripping from his sword. The Guru then demanded another head. One more volunteer came forward, and entered the tent with him. The Guru again emerged with blood on his sword. This happened three more times. Then the five volunteers came out of the tent unharmed. Everyone was very confused.

The Guru caused his five faithful Sikhs to stand up. He put pure water into an iron vessel and stirred it with a khanda or two edged sword. He then repeated over it the sacred verses which he appointed for the ceremony, namely, the Japji, the Jaap, Guru Amar Das's Anand, Chopai Sahib and Twe Parsad Swaiyas or quatrains of his own composition.

— Max Arthur Macauliffe, The Sikh Religion, volume 5 (1909), page 94

The ceremony involves stirring water in an iron bowl with a double-edged sword whilst reciting religious hymns, along with an admixture of sugar.

These five men came to be known as the Panj Pyare (the "beloved five"). The five men, who would be initiated into the Khalsa by receiving Amrit, included Daya Singh, Mukham Singh, Sahib Singh, Dharam Singh, and Himmat Singh. From then onward, Sikh men were given the name Singh ("lion"), and the women Kaur ("princess").

The next five (out of a total of ten) to undergo the Pahul were Ram Singh, Desa Singh, Tehal Singh, Ishar Singh, and Fateh Singh. This group is termed as the Panj Mukte.

According to the Guru Kian Sakhian, after the first ten baptisms (Panj Piare and Panj Mukte), around 20,000 men were ready to accept the baptism whilst a few rejected it. The list of men in-sequence who then underwent the Pahul were: Mani Ram, Diwan Bachittar Das, Ude Rai, Anik Das, Ajaib Das, Ajaib Chand, Chaupat Rai, Diwan Dharam Chand, Alam Chand Nachna, and Sahib Ram Koer. This group was then followed by Rai Chand Multani, Gurbakhsh Rai, Pandit Kirpa Ram Dutt of Mattan, Subeg Chand, Gurmukh Das, Sanmukh Das, Amrik Chand, Purohit Daya Ram, Ratna, Gani Das, Lal Chand Peshauria, Rup Chand, Sodhi Dip Chand, Nand Chand, Nanu Rai of Diwali, and Hazari, Bhandari and Darbari of Sirhind. As many as 80,000 men are said to have been baptized in a few days after Vaisakhi 1699. The ceremony is first attested to in literature in Bhai Jaita's Sri Gur Katha, which refers to the ceremony as Amrit Bidhi.

In 1903, it was reported that a commonly-understood, general practice was that initiates undergoing the ceremony must have reached the "age of reason", usually meaning they had reached the age of at least 10 years old. Around 1,200 persons were being baptized into the Khalsa at the Akal Bunga on an annual basis at that time in the very early 20th century.

=== Kirpan-di-Pahul ===
Kirpan-di-Pahul is a ceremony distinguishable from the Khande-di-Pahul in many ways. These include: the use of a kirpan sword to stir the amrit rather than a khanda sword, the recitation of fewer prayers during the ceremony and the practice of only one initiated Sikh administering the Amrit as opposed to the traditional Panj Pyaare. This form of the baptism ceremony was held for women. The practice is common in Dakhni Sikhs, with those being administered amrit through the kirpan being held to more lax standards when compared to those administered amrit through the khanda, which is known as khande-baate da amrit. Those who receive baptism through the kirpan often do not observe the Khalsa rules as stringently, with some not wearing a kirpan at all times. According to Birinder Pal Singh, the Kirpan-di-Pahul ceremony likely evolved to co-opt women from Hindu backgrounds of various caste and communal origins into the Sikh fold in the Deccan region. In 1903, a guide to the Golden Temple stated that women undergoing the ceremony at the Akal Bunga did not have the elixir for their baptism stirred with a double-edged, iron sword (khanda) like the male initiates, but rather with a single-edged, miniature, iron sword called a kard.

=== Choola ===
Choola is the practice of giving the children of Amritdhari Sikhs a handful of amrit, in-order to prepare them for undergoing the actual Amrit Sanchar initiation once they are older. It is also given during punishment of an Amritdhari Sikh who has committed a minor transgression against the rehat.

== Ceremony ==
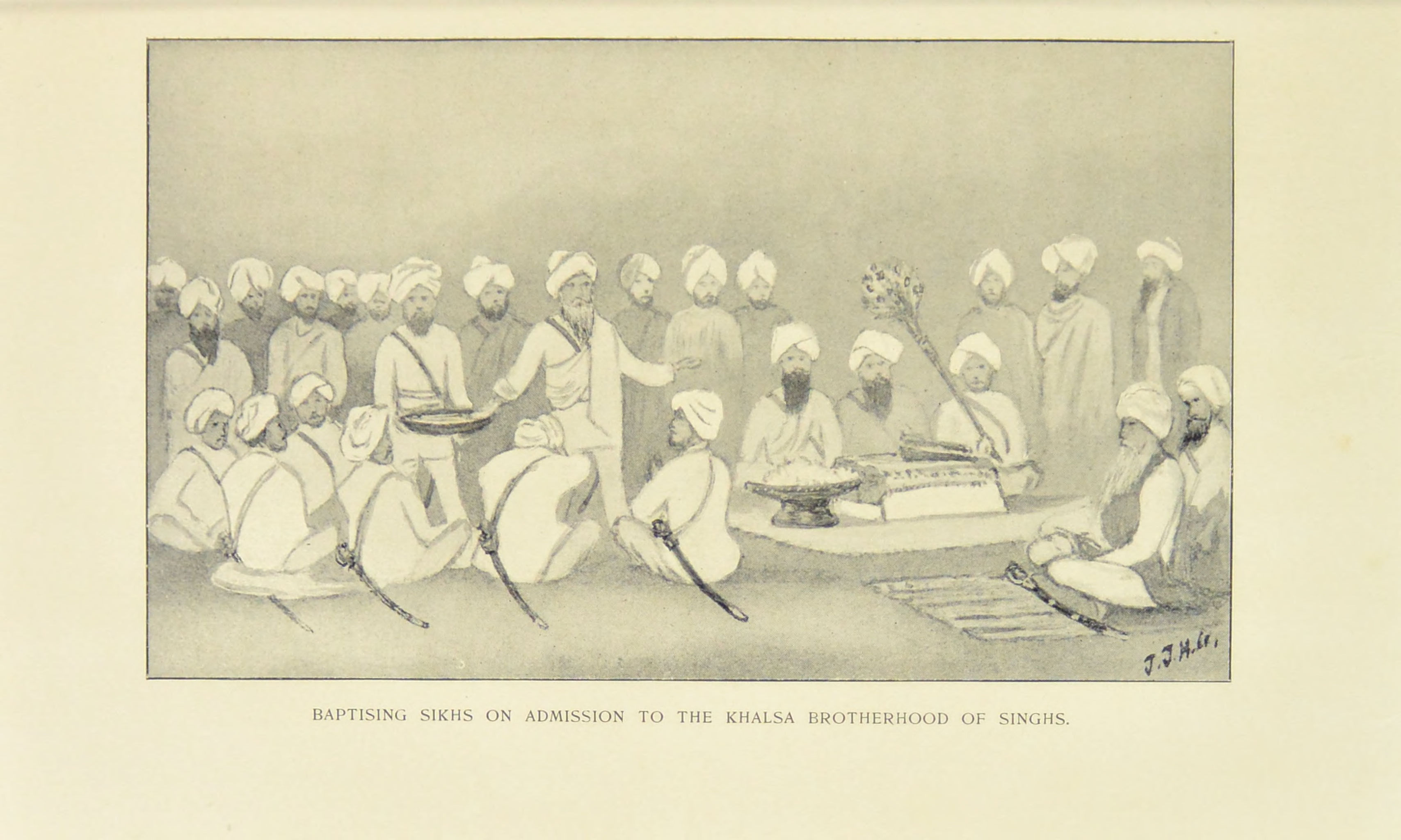
Illustration titled 'Baptising Sikhs on Admission to the Khalsa Brotherhood of Singhs' from The Sikhs (1904) by John James Hood Gordon

Rules of the ceremony include

- Being conducted in any quiet and convenient place. In addition to the Guru Granth Sahib, the presence of six Sikhs is necessary: one granthi ("narrator"), who reads from the holy text, and five others, representing the original five beloved disciples (pyare), to administer the ceremony.
- Taking a bath and washing of the hair prior to the ceremony is mandatory by those who are receiving the initiation and those who are administering.
- Any Sikh who is mentally and physically sound (male or female) may administer the rites of initiation if they have received the rites and continue to adhere to the Sikh rehni ("way of life") and wear the Sikh articles of faith (i.e. the Five Ks).
- There is no minimum age requirement, though it is rare for younger children since the individual should be able to understand the implications of initiation.
- The person to become Amritdhari must wear the five holy symbols (the Five Ks):
  1. Kesh (unshorn hair)
  2. Kirpan ("sword", i.e. a small dagger worn on the person)
  3. Kacchera (prescribed boxer shorts)
  4. Kangha (comb tucked in the tied-up hair)
  5. Karha (steel bracelet)
- He/she must not have on any jewellery, distinctive marks, or tokens associated with any other faith. He/she must not have his/her head bare or be wearing a cap. The head must be covered with a cloth. He/she must not be wearing any ornaments piercing through any part of the body. The persons to be Amritdhari must stand respectfully with hands folded facing the Guru Granth Sahib.
- Anyone seeking re-initiation after having resiled from their previous vows may be assigned a penance by the five administering initiation before being re-admitted.
- During the ceremony, one of the five pyare stands and explains the rules and obligations of the Khalsa Panth.
- Those receiving initiation have to give their assent as to whether they are willing to abide by the rules and obligations.
- After their assent, one of the five pyare utters a prayer for the commencement of the preparation of the Amrit and a randomly selected passage (hukam, a "Command of God") is taken from Sri Guru Granth Sahib.

The person being initiated must chant "Waheguru ji ka Khalsa, Waheguru ji ki Fateh" (essentially meaning "Almighty Lord, the pure; Almighty Lord, the victorious"). The salutation is repeated and the holy water is sprinkled on their eyes and hair, five times. The remainder of the nectar is shared by all receiving the initiation, all drinking from the same bowl. Sometimes portions of the Akal Ustat and 33 Savaiye compositions of Guru Gobind Singh found within the Dasam Granth is used during the ceremony.

After this, all those taking part in the ceremony recite the Mool Mantra and they are inducted into the Khalsa.

=== Aftermath ===
After successfully undergoing the ceremony, a new Amritdhari is expected to have the following traits:

- dharam nash, the rejection of any previous religious affiliations
- kirat nash, the rejection of any previous occupational affiliations
- kul nash, the rejection of any previous familial and caste affiliations
- karam nash, the rejection of any previous superstitious or ritual beliefs

== See also ==
- Amrita
