= Oorah =

Battle cry in the U.S. Marine Corps since the mid-20th century

Oorah is a battle cry common in the United States Marine Corps since the mid-20th century.

Several anecdotes attributed the phrase to John R. Massaro's time as a gunnery sergeant in the Reconnaissance Company, 1st Marine Division, in the mid-1950s. Massaro (who later became sergeant major of the Marine Corps) and other Marines who trained aboard the submarine USS Perch, beginning in 1949, used oorah in imitation of the vessel's klaxon horn (which sounded like arrugha). Others have attributed the phrase's popularization to Massaro's subsequent time at Marine Corps Recruit Depot San Diego, where use of the word spread.

Massaro has said that he did not originate the word (saying in 2015: "It was a phrase or a term originally coming from boarding a ship") and that the word was already in use in 1949.

== See also ==
- Hooah
- Hooyah
- Huzzah
- Semper fidelis
