= Hooray (disambiguation) =

"Hooray" or huzzah is an exclamation.

Hooray may also refer to:

- an exclamation of cheering
- Hooray for Boobies, a Bloodhound Gang album, released in censored forms as simply Hooray
- Hooray (horse) (born 2008), a British thoroughbred racehorse
- "Hooray", a song by Delays from the 2008 album Everything's the Rush
- "Hooray!", a song by the Smashing Pumpkins from the 2023 album Atum: A Rock Opera in Three Acts
- Hurray (game)

== See also ==
- Hip Hip Hurray (disambiguation)
