= The Last Hurrah (disambiguation) =

The Last Hurrah may refer to:

- The Last Hurrah, a 1956 novel by Edwin O'Connor
- The Last Hurrah (1958 film)
- The Last Hurrah (1977 film)
- The Last Hurrah (2009 film)
- The Last Hurrah, a 2012 6-part audio play starring Rik Mayall
- "The Last Hurrah" (The West Wing)
- The Last Hurrah of the Golden Horde, first collection of science fiction stories by author Norman Spinrad
- Last Hurrah for Chivalry, 1979 Hong Kong wuxia film directed and written by John Woo
- Larry Holmes vs. Muhammad Ali, a boxing match billed as "The Last Hurrah!"
- "Last Hurrah" (song), a 2019 song by Bebe Rexha
- The Last Hurrah: Sterling Price's Missouri Expedition of 1864, a 2015 nonfiction book

== See also ==
- Huzzah
- Hurrah (disambiguation)
