= Battle cry =

Yell or chant taken up in battle

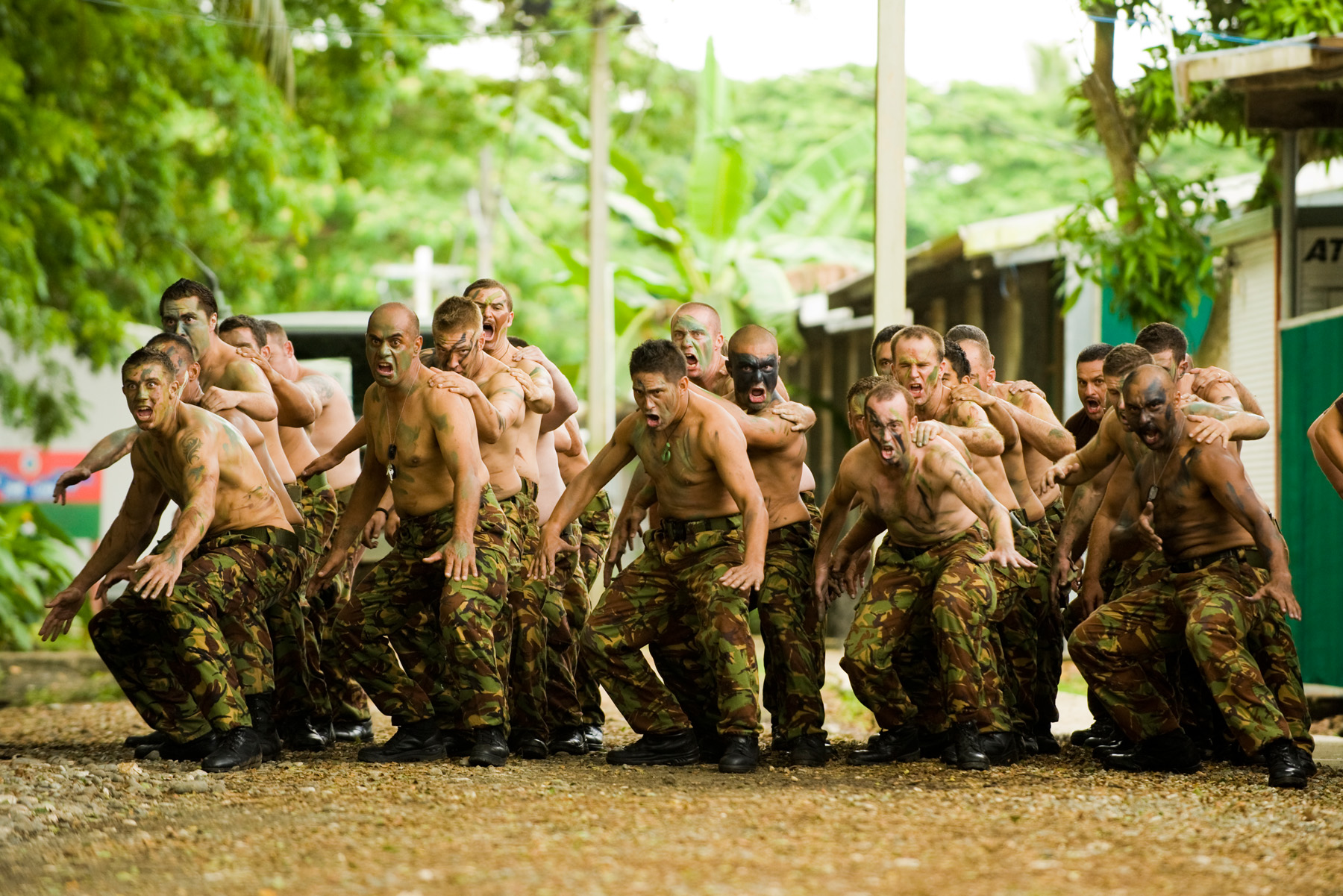
NZDF soldiers performing a battle cry

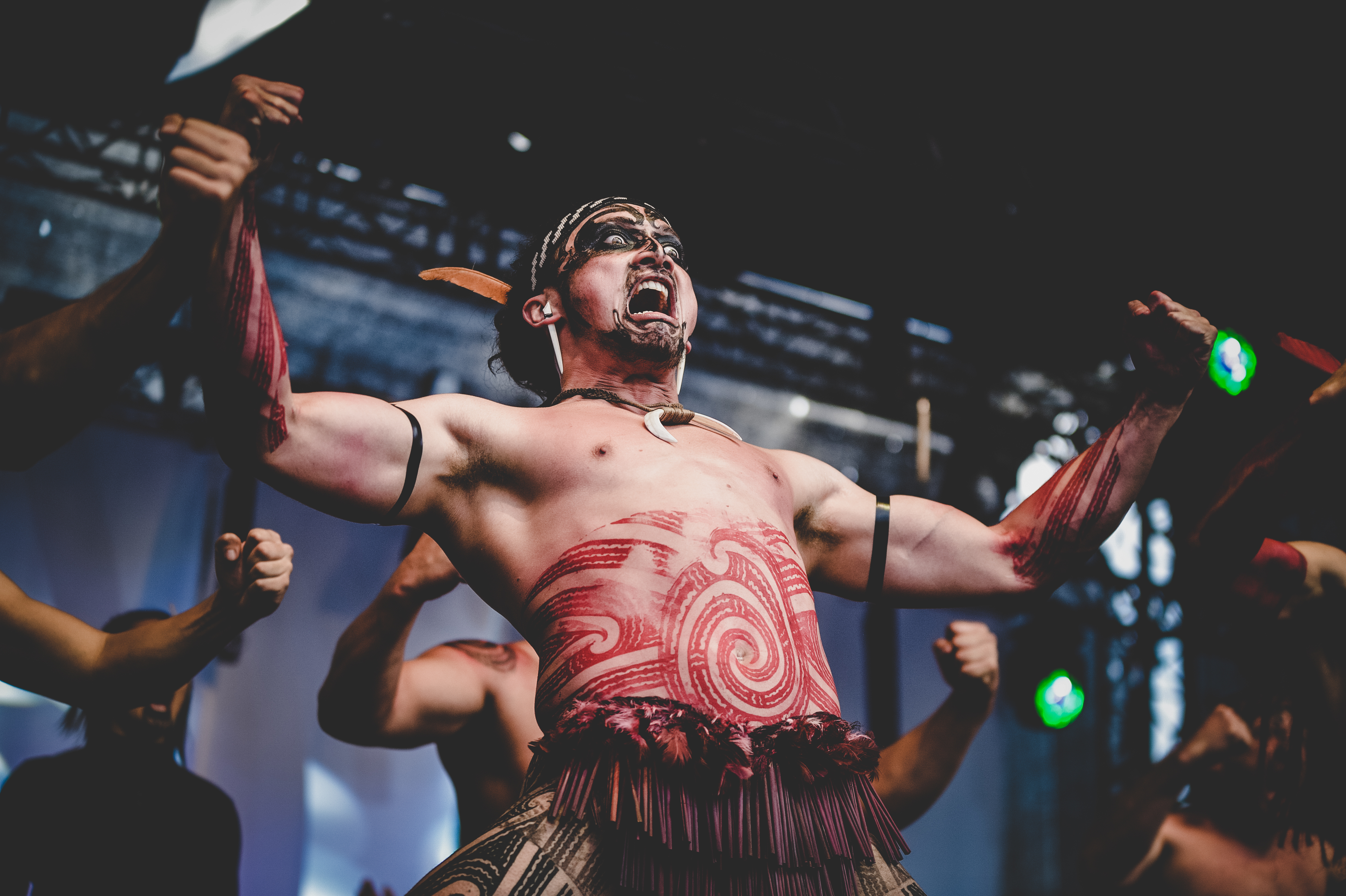
A Māori performer giving a Haka at a folk festival in Poland

A battle cry or war cry is a yell or chant taken up in battle, usually by members of the same combatant group. Battle cries are not necessarily articulate (e.g. "Eulaliaaaa!", "Alala"..), although they often aim to invoke patriotic or religious sentiment. Their purpose is twofold, both arousing aggression and esprit de corps on one's own side and causing intimidation on the hostile side. Battle cries are a universal form of display behaviour (i.e., threat display) aiming at competitive advantage, ideally by overstating one's own aggressive potential to a point where the enemy prefers to avoid confrontation altogether and opts to flee. In order to overstate one's potential for aggression, battle cries need to be as loud as possible, and have historically often been amplified by acoustic devices such as horns, drums, conches, carnyxes, bagpipes, bugles, etc. (see also martial music).

Battle cries are closely related to other behavioral patterns of human aggression, such as war dances and taunting, performed during the "warming up" phase preceding the escalation of physical violence. From the Middle Ages, many cries appeared on speech scrolls in standards or coat of arms as slogans (see slogan (heraldry)) and were adopted as mottoes, an example being the motto "Dieu et mon droit" ("God and my right") of the English kings. It is said that this was Edward III's rallying cry during the Battle of Crécy. The word "slogan" originally derives from sluagh-gairm or sluagh-ghairm (sluagh = "people", "army", and gairm = "call", "proclamation"), the Scottish Gaelic word for "gathering-cry" and in times of war for "battle-cry". The Gaelic word was borrowed into English as slughorn, sluggorne, "slogum", and slogan.

== History ==
=== Antiquity ===
- The war cry is an aspect of epic battle in Homer: in the Iliad, Diomedes is conventionally called "Diomedes of the loud war cry." Hellenes and Akkadians alike uttered the onomatopoeic cry "alala" in battle.
- The troops of ancient Athens, during the Medic Wars and the Peloponnesian War were noted for going into battle shouting "Alala!" or "Alale!", which was supposed to emulate the cry of the owl, the bird of their patron goddess Athena.
- Eleleu (ἐλελεῦ) was an ancient Greek war cry. The Suda states that people going into battle shouted ἐλελεῦ together with a rhythmic movement. As an example, it quotes Achaeus of Eretria's Philoctetes, where Agamemnon orders the Achaeans to take up their swords and sound the trumpet before crying, "ἐλελεῦ!"
- The Western Huns attacked with terrifying battle cries.
- One of the common Hindu war cries was "Hara Hara Mahadeva" meaning, "Hail to Mahadeva!" (Shiva).
- Another common war cry in India was "Jai Bhavani" meaning, "Hail goddess Bhavani!”
- A common war cry used in ancient Tamilakam was "Vetrivel, Veeravel", meaning, "Victorious vel, courageous vel." Vel is the spear of Murugan, the regional form of Kartikeya, the Hindu war deity. In the contemporary period, the battle cry "Vetrivel, Veeravel" is being used in the 191 Field Regiment of the Indian Army based in Madukkarai, Coimbatore.

=== Middle Ages ===
- During the Scottish wars of independence, Scottish soldiers used Alba gu bràth as a battle-cry, a phrase that means 'Scotland for ever' (literally, 'Scotland until judgement'.) This was depicted in the film Braveheart during which Mel Gibson, playing William Wallace, shouts the phrase to rally his soldiers just before a battle commenced.
- Each Turkic tribe and tribal union had its distinct tamga (seal), totemic ongon bird, and distinct uran (battle cry) (hence the Slavic urah "battle cry"). While tamgas and ongons could be distinct down to individuals, the hue of horses and uran battle cries belonged to each tribe, were passed down from generation to generation, and some modern battle cries were recorded in antiquity. On split of the tribe, their unique distinction passed to a new political entity, endowing different modern states with the same uran battle cries of the split tribes, for example Kipchak battle cry among Kazakhs, Kyrgyzs, Turkmens, and Uzbeks. Some larger tribes' uran battle cries:
  - Kipchak – "ay-bas" ("lunar head").
  - Kangly (Kangars) – "bai-terek" ("sacred tree").
  - Oguzes – "teke" ("mount")
- Desperta ferro! ("Awake iron!" in Catalan) was the most characteristic cry of the Almogavar warriors during the Crown of Aragon military campaigns across the Mediterranean from the 12th through to the 14th centuries.
- Deus vult! ("God wills it!" in Latin) was the battle cry of the Crusaders.
- Montjoie Saint Denis!: battle cry of the Kings of France since the 12th century.
- Santiago y cierra, España! was a war cry of Spanish troops during the Reconquista, and of the Spanish Empire.
- On 14 August 1431, the whole Army of the Holy Roman Empire (of the 4th anti-Hussite crusade) was defeated by the Hussites in the Battle of Domažlice. Attacking imperial units started to retreat after hearing Ktož jsú boží bojovníci ("Ye Who Are Warriors of God") choral and were annihilated shortly after.
- Allāhu Akbar (الله أكبر, "God is [the] Greatest") and Allāhu Allāh (الله الله, "God! God!") were used by Muslim armies throughout history. Al-naṣr aw al-shahāda (النصر أو الشهادة, "Victory or martyrdom") was also a common battle cry; the At-Tawbah 9:52 says that God has promised to the righteous Muslim warrior one of these two glorious ideals.
- Óðinn á yðr alla (Odin owns you all) – A reference to Odin's self sacrifice at Yggdrasil. Attributed to Eric the Victorious.

=== Pre-modern ===
- During the Sengoku period, "Ei ei ō!" (えいえいおう) was used by generals to boost morals of their soldiers before battle as a form of war cry.
- When suppressing peasants' rebellions in Germany and Scandinavia around 1500, such as in the Battle of Hemmingstedt, the Dutch mercenaries of the Black Guard yelled Wahr di buer, die garde kumt ("Beware, peasants, the guards are coming"). When the peasants counterattacked, they responded with Wahr di, Garr, de Buer de kumt ("Beware, Guard, of the peasant, [who is] coming").
- The Spanish cried Santiago ("Saint James") both when reconquering Spain from the Moors and during conquest in early colonial America.
- Polish "Winged Hussars" used to shout Jezus Maria ("Jesus, Mary") or Matka Boska ("Mother of God") during their charges.
- King Henry IV of France (1553–1610), a pleasure-loving and cynical military leader, was famed for wearing a striking white plume in his helmet and for his war cry: Ralliez-vous à mon panache blanc! ("Follow my white plume!").
- Burmese soldiers of the Konbaung Dynasty under Alaungpaya were recorded to shout Shwebo-Thar (Sons of Shwebo) during the Konbaung-Hanthawady War.
- Most of the jaikaras were popularized by Guru Gobind Singh. The Sikhs have a number of battle cries or jaikara: the most popular ones are as follows:
  - Bolnaji (Respectfully Utter) – Waheguru (Wondrous Enlightener)
  - Deg Teg Fateh (Victory to Charity and Arms) – Birdh ki Paij Panth ki jit (Rout of the Enemy Victory of the Sikh Path)
  - Bole So Nihal...Sat Sri Akaal ("Shout Aloud in Ecstasy... True is the Great Timeless One"),
  - Nanak naam charhdi kalaa (May Thy name be exalted O Nanak) – Tere bhaanae sarbatt daa bhalaa (and all people prosper by Thy grace)
  - Waheguru ji ka Khalsa (the Community of the Pure belongs to the Wondrous Enlightener) – Waheguru ji ki Fateh (Victory belongs to the Wondrous Enlightener)
  - Raj Karega Khalsa – (The Khalsa will rule) Aaakki Rahe Na Koye (And no opponent will remain)
  - Gaj ke jaikara gajaave fateh paave nihaal ho jaavae, Sat Sri Akaal gurbaar akaal hee akaal|| (excerpt from ardas of Buddha Dal prayerbook (gutka) praising the blessing of uttering jaikara proclaiming supreme truth).
- The Pashtun soldiers' war cry against the Mughals was Hu, Hu.
- The Rozvi army employed a war chant called Bayawabaya (see Rozvi Empire § Military).
- The Gurkha (Gorkha) soldiers' battle cry was, and still is, "Jai Mahakali, Ayo Gorkhali!" ("Victory to Goddess Mahakali, the Gurkhas are coming!")
- The "rebel yell" was a battle cry used by Confederate soldiers during the American Civil War.
- Finnish light cavalry troops in the Swedish Army in the 17th and 18th centuries would use the battle cry "Hakkaa päälle!" ("Cut them down!" in Finnish), lending them the name Hackapell.
- Irish regiments of various armies used and continue to use Gaelic War cries, "Faugh a Ballagh" ("Clear the way!") or "Erin go Bragh" ("Ireland Forever")
- The Swedish army in the 18th and 19th centuries would be issued with the command to attack with "För Fäderneslandet, gå på, Hurra!" ("For the Fatherland, onwards, Hurrah!")
- Argentine general José de San Martín is known in South America for his war cry: "Seamos libres, que lo demás no importa nada!" ("Let's be free, nothing else matters!").
- In the Texas Revolution, following the Battle of Goliad and the Battle of the Alamo, Texan soldiers would use the battle cry "Remember Goliad! Remember the Alamo!"
- In the Battle of Dybbøl in 1864, both Danish and German forces used "Hurrah" as a war cry.
- During World War I in the Italian Front of 1915. Before battle, Italian soldiers would yell "Savoia" or "Avanti Savoia", which is "Come on Savoy!" or "Onwards Savoy!" in Italian (compare "For the king!" among British soldiers of the same era).

=== Modern ===
- During World War II, Tennōheika Banzai (天皇陛下万歳, May the Emperor live for ten thousand years) served as a battle cry of sorts for Japanese soldiers, particularly in a "banzai charge". The most popular battle cry is "Ei ei oh" (エイエイオー), which is usually used at the start of battle.
- "Avanti Savoia!" (English: Go Savoy!) was the patriotic battle cry of the Italian Royal Army during World War I and to a lesser extent, World War II. Infantrymen would scream this motto when launching an offensive attack, namely against the Austro-Hungarians.
- During the Greco-Italian War (in WWII), the Greeks would shout "Αέρα!" (wind) as their battle cry.
- During the Korean War, the Korean People's Army used the phrase "김일성 수령님 만세" (transliterated gim-ilseong sulyeongnim manse, translated as "Long live the Great Leader Kim Il Sung").
- "Hooah" is the war cry of the United States Army, the United States Air Force, and the United States Space Force. "Oorah" is the war cry used by United States Marine Corps. "Hooyah" is the war cry of the United States Navy and the United States Coast Guard.
- The Slavic version, "Ura!" has been used by the Imperial Russian Army, the Red Army, Russian Ground Forces, alongside many more Eastern European armed forces. It was also used by Yugoslav Partisans as Juriš/Јуриш.
- "Merdeka atau mati!" (English: Freedom or death!) Used by Indonesian national army and freedom fighters (Indonesian: Pedjoeang/pejuang) during the Indonesian National Revolution.
- In Afghanistan, Norwegian troops of the Telemark Battalion would sometimes use the battle cry "Til Valhall!" (To Valhalla!) followed by Oorah.
- Mujahideen and jihadists in the Middle East and North Africa shout "Allahu Akbar" (God is the Greatest).
- During the Bangladesh Liberation War the Mukti Bahini would shout "Joy Bangla" ("Victory to Bengal" / "Long live Bengal") during their battles against the Pakistani military.
- During the Indochina War in Vietnam, the Viet Minh soldiers usually used "Xung phong" (English: Charge) whenever attacking the enemy. The same battle cry would be used later by PAVN and NLF forces during the Vietnam War.
- Each individual regiment of the Indian Army has a unique war cry. These chants are sonorous with the beliefs of individual castes and religions from which the troops belong to.
- Croatian armed forces during the Croatian War of Independence would use "Za dom spremni". One would start by saying "Za dom!" and the rest would follow with "Spremni!". It translates loosely to "For home – ready!" or "For homeland – ready!".
- Leeroy Jenkins is an internet meme, which has often served the purpose of an ironic or fatalistic parody of a battle cry, originating from a famous video of a World of Warcraft clan creating an intricate battle plan, before being party-wiped as a result of Leeroy Jenkins, who had been AFK at the time, charging in head-first. This gave rise to the phrase in first-person shooter games, where players will shout "LEEROOOOOOOOOOOOOOOOOY JEEEEEENKIIIIIIIIIINS!" as they charge at the enemy. The phrase has gained notoriety, making appearances in various non-World of Warcraft media.
- Various Kurdish groups such as PKK, YPG and Peshmerga use the following phrases "Bijî Kurdistan!" short for "Her Bijî Kurdistan" (English: Long Live Kurdistan), which is usually accompanied with "Her Bijî!" (English : Long live) "Yan Kurdistan Yan Neman" (English: Either Kurdistan or Extinction!)
- During the 2022 Russian invasion of Ukraine, "Slava Ukraini" (Слава Україні! English: Glory to Ukraine!), often accompanied by a reply of "Heroiam Slava" (Героям слава! English: Glory to the heroes!), became an internationally-known battle cry not only among domestic forces, but also among Western, mostly NATO allies.

== In Literature ==
- In Brian Jacques's Redwall series, the hares of the Long Patrol have the warcry "Eulalia!"

== See also ==
- Grito (Mexican shout)
- Alala
- Alarm call
- Battle Cry of Freedom
- Catchphrase
- Cheer
- Demoralization (warfare)
- Huzzah
- Kiai
- Military slang
- Mobbing call
- Slogan (heraldry)
- War dance
- Terrorist
- Suicide attack
