= Hip Hip Hurray (disambiguation) =

Hip hip hooray is a cheer called out to express congratulation.

Hip Hip Hurray or similar may also refer to:

== Film and television ==
- Hip Hip Hurray (TV series), a 1998–2001 Indian TV series
- Hip Hip Hurray (1984 film), a 1984 Hindi film
- Hip Hip Hurrah! (film), a 1987 Danish-Norwegian-Swedish drama film
- Hip Hip-Hurry!, a 1958 Warner Bros. Merrie Melodies animated short film
- Hip-Hip and Hurrah, a 2011–2013 Polish animated TV series
- Hip Hip Hurray (2026 film), a Gujarati film

== Music ==
- Hip! Hip! Hooray! (1907 musical), a musical by Gus Edwards and Edgar Smith
- Hip! Hip! Hooray! (1915 musical), a musical by Raymond Hubbell and R. H. Burnside
- "Hip Hip Hooray" (Sneaky Sound System song), 2004
- Hip Hip Hooray, a children's album from Play School (Australian TV series)
- Hip Hip Hura, a 1985 album by Chrisye
- "Hip Hip Hooray", a 2016 song by Dappy
- "Hip Hop Hooray", a 1992 song by Naughty by Nature

== Other uses ==
- Hip, Hip, Hurrah!, an 1888 painting by Peder Severin Krøyer

== See also ==
- Hooray (disambiguation)
- Huzzah
