= Hurrah Pass =

Mountain pass in Utah, US

- Interactive map of Hurrah Pass
- Elevation: 4,780 ft (1,460 m)
- Traversed by: Kane Springs Road

Third Approach
- Location: San Juan County, Utah, United States
- Coordinates: 38°28′55″N 109°37′30″W

Hurrah Pass (el. 4780 ft.) is a mountain pass in Utah.
