= Marine Corps Recruit Depot San Diego =

US Marine Corps base in San Diego, California

- San Diego, California
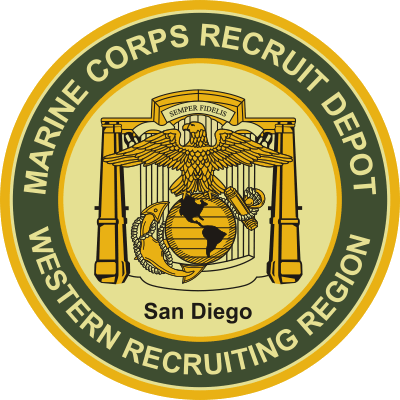
- Marine Corps Recruit Depot Historic District
- U.S. National Register of Historic Places
- U.S. Historic district
- Location within San Diego County, California Location within California Location within the United States
- Location: S of jct. of Barnett Ave. and Pacific Hwy., San Diego, California
- Coordinates: 32°44′31″N 117°11′50″W
- Area: 110 acres (45 ha)
- Architects: Goodhue, Bertram G.; Dawson Construction Co.
- Architectural style: Mission/Spanish Revival
- NRHP reference No.: 90001477
- Added to NRHP: January 31, 1991

Site information
- Type: Military base
- Controlled by: United States Marine Corps
- Website: mcrdsd.marines.mil

Site history
- Built: 1919
- In use: 1919–present

Garrison information
- Current commander: BGen David C. Hyman
- Garrison: Recruit training Drill instructor training Recruiter training

Marine Corps Recruit Depot San Diego (MCRD San Diego) is a United States Marine Corps military installation in San Diego, California. It lies between San Diego Bay and Interstate 5, adjacent to San Diego International Airport and the former Naval Training Center San Diego. MCRD San Diego's main mission is the initial training of enlisted male and female recruits living west of the Mississippi River. Over 21,000 recruits are trained each year. As of 2022, 1.5 million recruits have completed their boot camp training at the depot. It is also the home to the Marine Corps' Recruiter School and Drill Instructors School.

== History ==
The Marines made an amphibious landing in San Diego in 1846 from USS Savannah and USS Congress during the Mexican–American War. The Marines made a presence in San Diego again in July 1914, but ground was not broken for a permanent base until March 2, 1919. The initial proposal for the base came from Congressman William Kettner, who also proposed construction of Naval Training Center San Diego. The Marine base only became a reality due to the perseverance of its first commanding officer, Colonel Joseph Henry Pendleton (later a general and the namesake of Camp Pendleton). Before the commissioning of the base on Dutch Flats, the Marines were based in Balboa Park. The structures were designed by architect Bertram Goodhue in the Spanish Colonial Revival style, and they echoed the style used for the buildings of the 1915 Panama–California Exposition (also inspired by Goodhue). The base and its original buildings are now on the National Register of Historic Places listings in San Diego County, California.

On December 1, 1921, the base was formally commissioned as the Marine Advanced Expeditionary Base San Diego. In 1923, the Marine Corps Recruit Depot for the west coast was relocated to the new base in San Diego from Mare Island Naval Shipyard, Vallejo, California. On March 1, 1924, the base became officially the Marine Corps Base San Diego. It became the Marine Corps' recruit training center for the western United States. During World War II, the flow of recruits into the base surged, with 18,000 recruits arriving in one month. On January 1, 1948, the base was officially renamed Marine Corps Recruit Depot San Diego.

== Recruit training ==
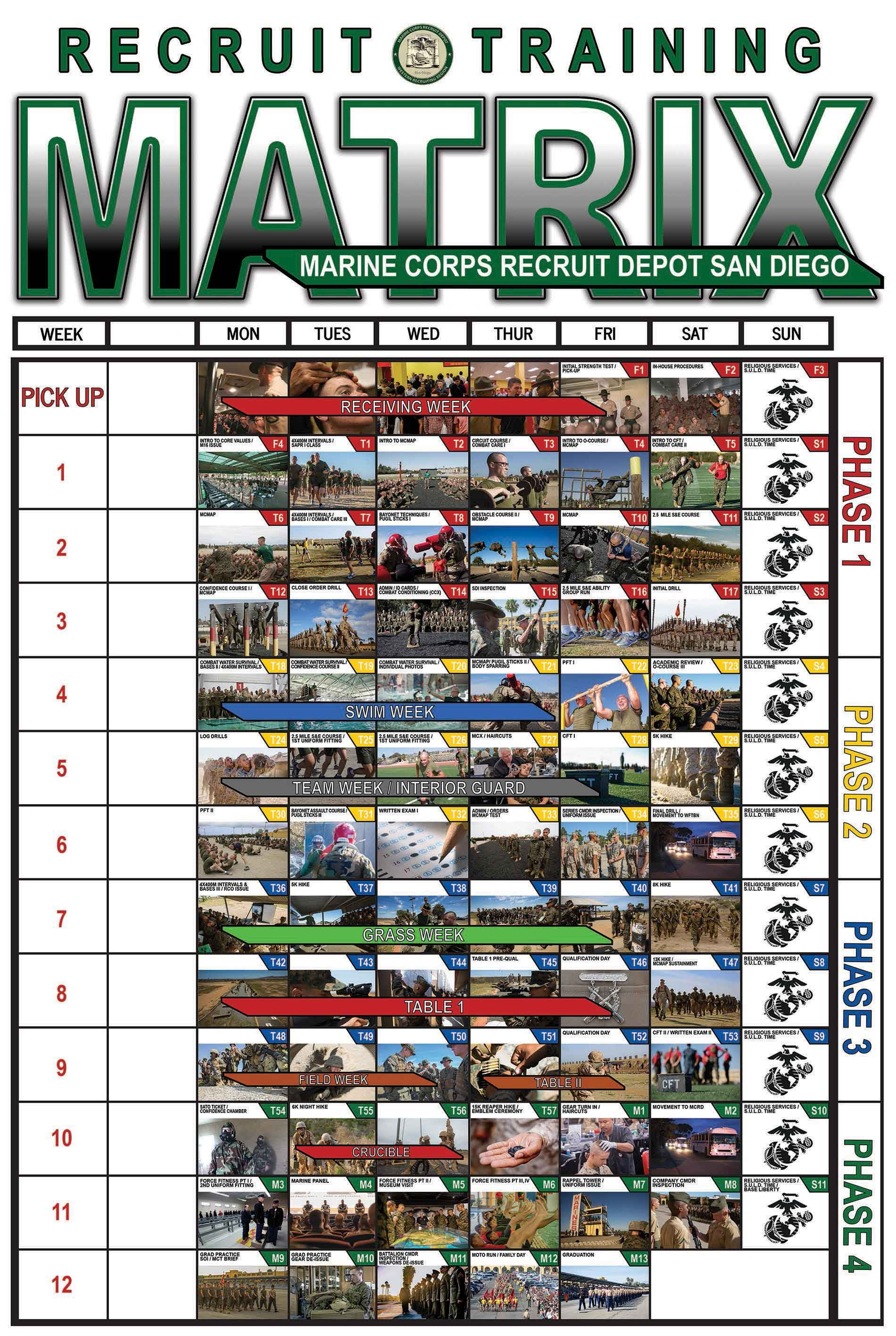
Recruit's training matrix

The base's main mission is to train new United States Marine Corps recruits, specifically males recruited from west of the Mississippi River, but also from some areas east of the river, such as Wisconsin, Michigan, the Chicago metropolitan area and New Orleans. Until 2021, all female recruits were trained at Marine Corps Recruit Depot Parris Island.

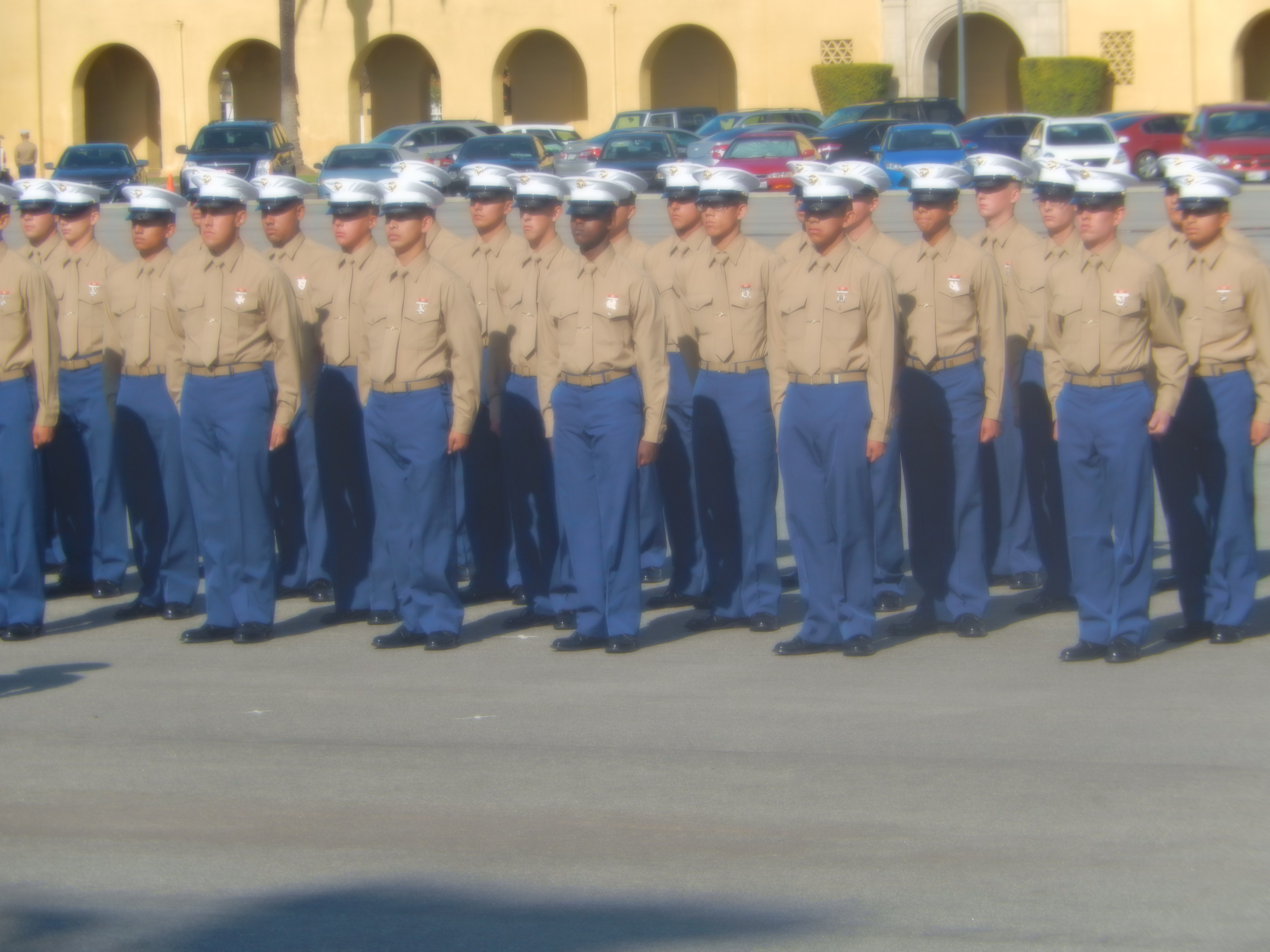
Marine Corps march in parade route at graduation from basic training in San Diego (December 20, 2013)

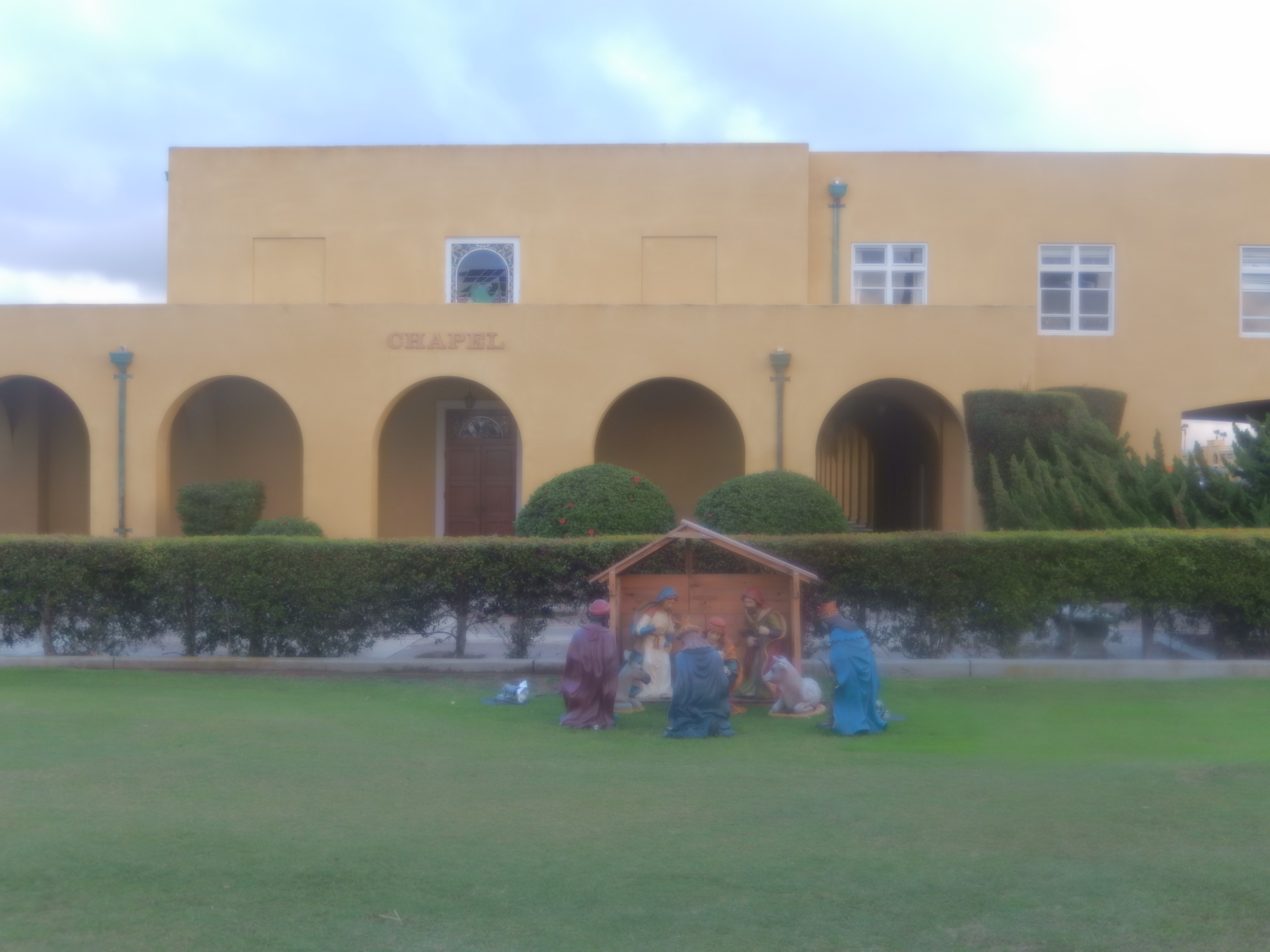
Chapel at Marine Corps Depot San Diego at Christmas season

Recruit training for those enlisted in the United States Marine Corps, includes a thirteen-week process during which the recruit becomes cut off from the civilian world and must adapt to a Marine Corps lifestyle. During training, drill instructors train recruits in a wide variety of subjects including weapons training, Marine Corps Martial Arts Program, personal hygiene and cleanliness, close order drill, and Marine Corps history. The training emphasizes physical fitness, and recruits must attain a minimum standard of fitness to graduate by passing a Physical Fitness Test. Recruits must also meet minimum combat-oriented swimming qualifications, qualify in rifle marksmanship with the M16A4 service rifle, and pass a 54-hour simulated combat exercise known as "The Crucible".

Unlike training at Parris Island, recruits must leave the depot to conduct field training. At Edson Range aboard Marine Corps Base Camp Pendleton, recruits fire on the rifle range, conduct field training, and undergo the Crucible. At the conclusion, recruits return to MCRD San Diego for Marine week and then graduation.

On December 14, 2020, the depot agreed to accept female recruits. On December 17, 2020, three women successfully completed training at the depot to become drill instructors. 60 female recruits would then begin training at the San Diego depot's boot camp in February 2021. Despite training alongside men, it was acknowledged that female drill instructors were put in charge of training the women recruits. On April 22, 2021, 53 of these female recruits became Marines after becoming the first women to complete boot camp training at the San Diego Depot.

== Tenant organizations and facilities ==
In addition to recruit training, MCRD San Diego is also home to the Drill Instructor's School for the Western Recruiting Region and the Recruiter's School for the entire Marine Corps.

U.S. Coast Guard units are also stationed at MCRD, including a USCG Pacific Area Tactical Law Enforcement Detachment and a USCG Maritime Safety and Security Team.

MCRD base is also home to the MCRD San Diego Command Museum.

Several schools pertinent to the Marine Corps mission are and have been based at MCRD. Among these was the "Sea School," which trained the Marine Detachments for duty aboard Naval vessels. The Communications and Electronics School was formerly located there.

The parade deck at MCRD San Diego serves both as a vital part of every recruit's training and as a memorial to the veterans of WWII, Korea, Vietnam, and the war on terror. It also divides the portion of the base dedicated to recruit training from the sections housing other schools and administrative personnel.

== Possibility of closure ==
Some politicians have pushed for the closure of MCRD San Diego, primarily because it occupies what is now extremely valuable land adjacent to the city's harbor and airport. Although the installation was not on the 2005 Base Realignment and Closure list proposed by the Pentagon, the Defense Base Closure and Realignment Commission asked the Pentagon for a written explanation as to why the MCRD was not proposed to be closed and consolidated into the depot at Parris Island. The Commission noted that the Navy and Air Force had successfully consolidated training facilities without risk to the mission or risk of loss of "surge capability" (the ability to quickly increase the rate of recruit training if circumstances make that necessary). They also noted that the military value of San Diego is lower than Parris Island due in part to encroachment and land constraints.

Closure meets heavy resistance from the Marine Corps, because of the status of the parade deck as a memorial to veterans of World War II, Korea, Vietnam, and Iraq, as well as the cost of relocation of the Depot. In a July 14, 2005, public response to the commission, Gordon R. England, the acting deputy secretary of defense, stated that the Department of Defense did not recommend San Diego's closure because it would create a single point of failure in regard to Parris Island's vulnerability to hurricanes, among other threats. He also noted that the payback on such a closure would take over 100 years, due to the need for new construction at Parris Island and the need to relocate rather than eliminate personnel from San Diego.

== In popular culture ==
=== Film and TV ===
- Vietnam War-era recruit training at MCRD San Diego is depicted in the 1970 TV film Tribes, starring Darren McGavin and Jan-Michael Vincent. Portions of the movie were filmed on location at MCRD.
- Recruits marching on the parade deck at MCRD San Diego are shown during the opening montage of the 1960s TV show Gomer Pyle, U.S.M.C..
- A gruff Marine sergeant and a handsome new recruit compete for the affection of a nurse in Tell It to the Marines starring Lon Chaney. This is a black and white silent movie released in 1926, filmed partly at MCRD San Diego.
