= Kard =

Type of Persian knife; equivalent in the Persian language for knife

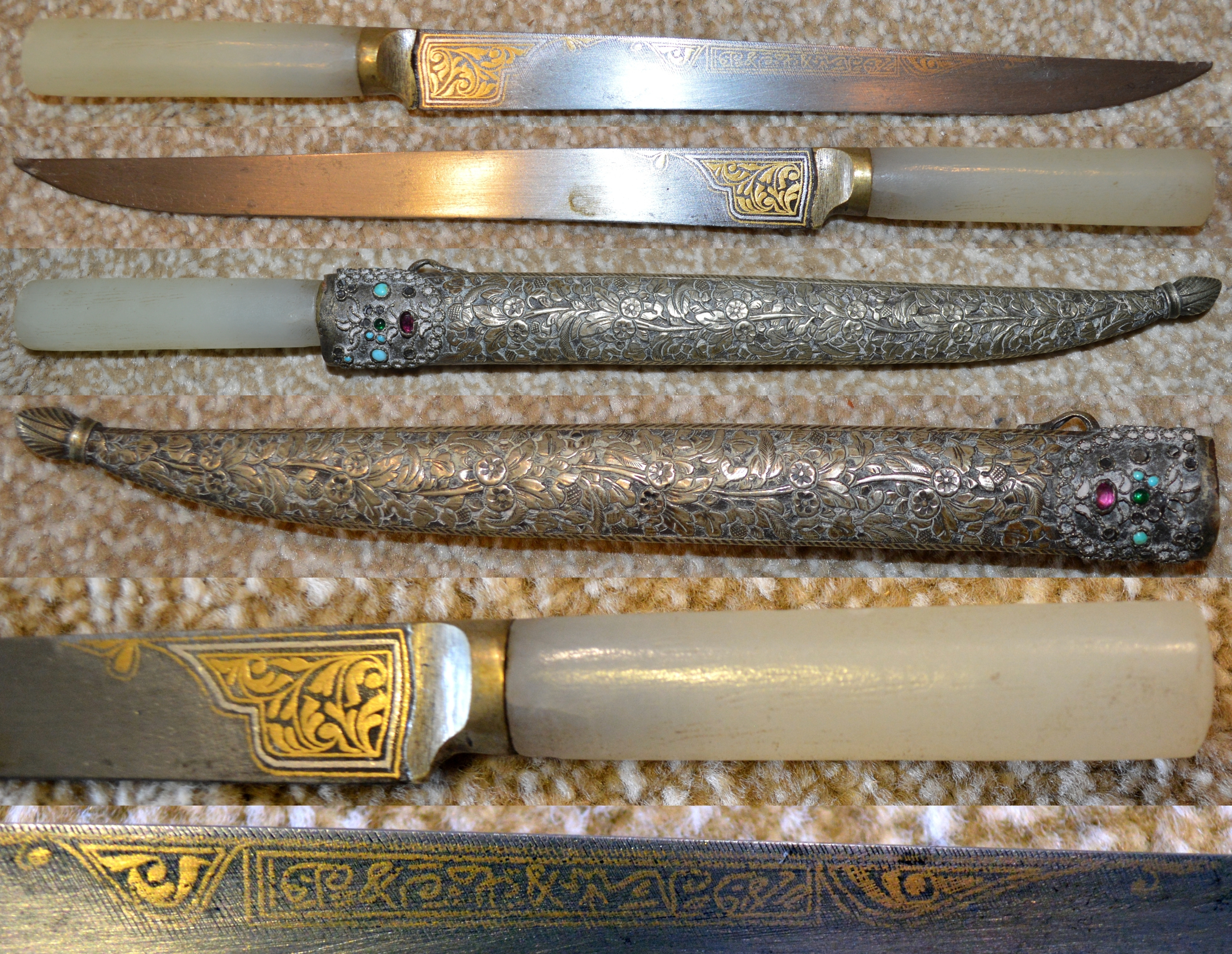
Ottoman kard dagger, 18th to 19th century, stone hilt with gold koftgari inscriptions, metal scabbard with carved decorations set with gems.

A kard (Persian: کارد, romanized: kārd, lit. 'knife') is the equivalent in the Persian language for knife.

In the specialist jargon, Kard is considered a type of knife found in the Persianate societies like Persia, Turkey, Armenia and all the way to India. Mostly used in the 18th century and before, it has a straight single edged blade and is usually no longer than 41 centimetres (16 in) in length. It has no guard, and usually the handle was bone, ivory, or horn. It was mostly a stabbing weapon, and commonly the point would be reinforced to penetrate chain mail. A major characteristic of a kard is that the hilt is only partially covered by the sheath.
