= Combat Fitness Test =

US Marine Corps physical fitness test

The Combat Fitness Test (CFT) is an annual physical fitness test of the United States Marine Corps. The purpose of the CFT is to assess a Marine's physical capacity in a broad spectrum of combat related tasks. The CFT was specifically designed to evaluate strength, stamina, agility, and coordination as well as overall anaerobic capacity. The CFT is a complement to the USMC Physical Fitness Test and measures the functional elements of combat fitness through execution of a series of events that represent every Marine's combat experience, emphasizing the ethos of "every Marine is a rifleman." All active duty and reserve Marines are required to conduct the Combat Fitness Test every year between the dates 1 July to 1 January. The test is designed to test each Marine's ability to perform in a high-intensity setting. The British Army formerly used a test of the same name which is currently known as the Annual Fitness Test.

== United States Marine Corps ==
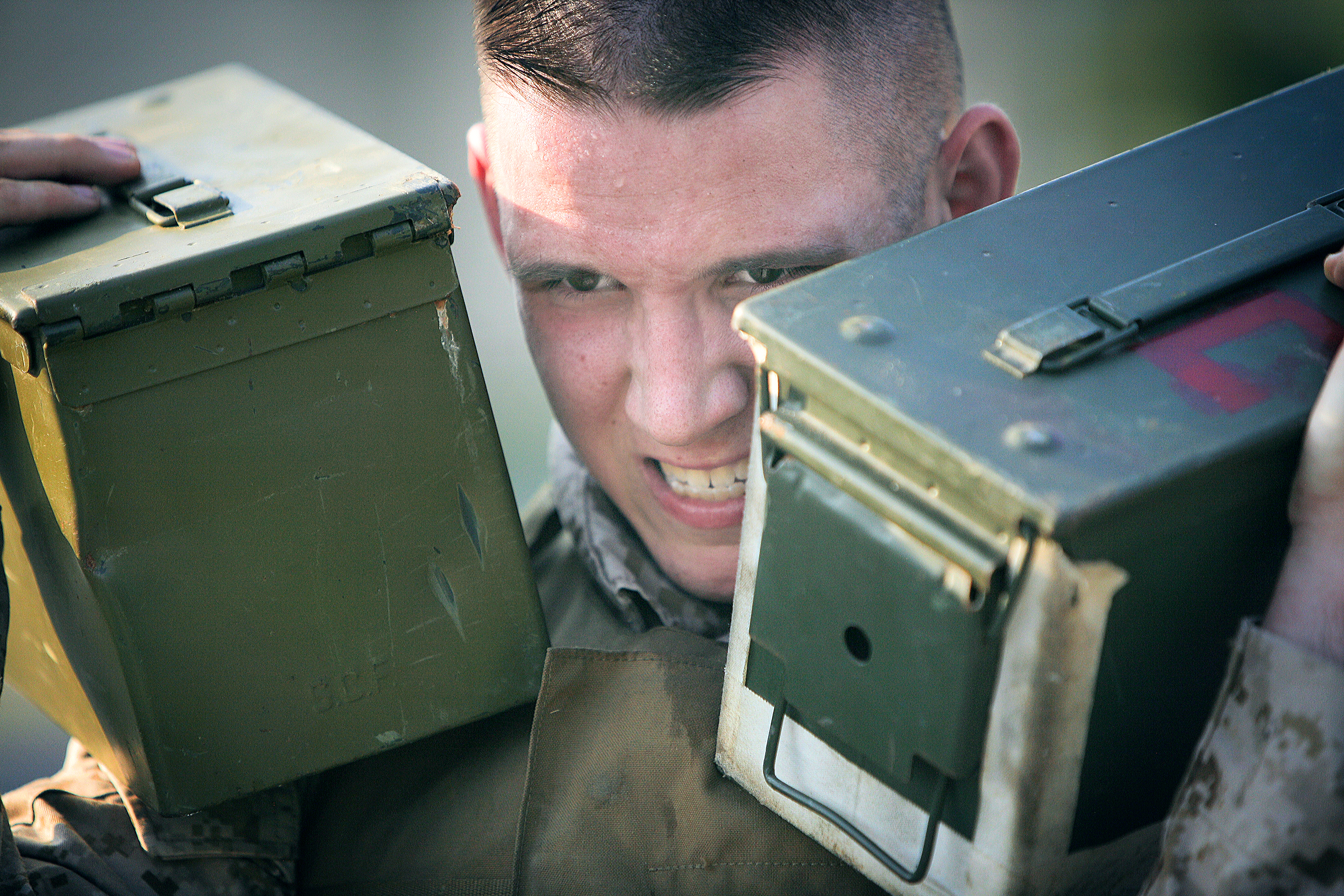
U.S. Marine holding two 30-pound ammunition cans on his shoulders during part of the combat fitness test at Marine Corps Air Station Iwakuni, Japan, on June 17, 2009

In the Marine Corps, the Combat Fitness Test has three events:

- an 880-yard "Movement to Contact" run in boots and utility pants
- two minutes of lifting a 30-pound ammo can over the head, earning 1–2 points for each number done in the time limit
- the "Maneuver Under Fire" drill is part obstacle course, part conditioning, and part combat test:
  - 10-yard sprint
  - 15-yard crawl (low then high crawl)
  - hauling a simulated casualty using two different carries: drag and fireman's carry over 75 yards zigzagging through cones
  - sprint while carrying two 30-pound ammo cans over 75 yards through the same cones
  - throwing a dummy hand grenade into a marked circle 22.5 yards away (adding 5 seconds to total time if missed, and subtracting 5 seconds if hit)
  - 5 pushups and a sprint with the ammo cans to the finish line.

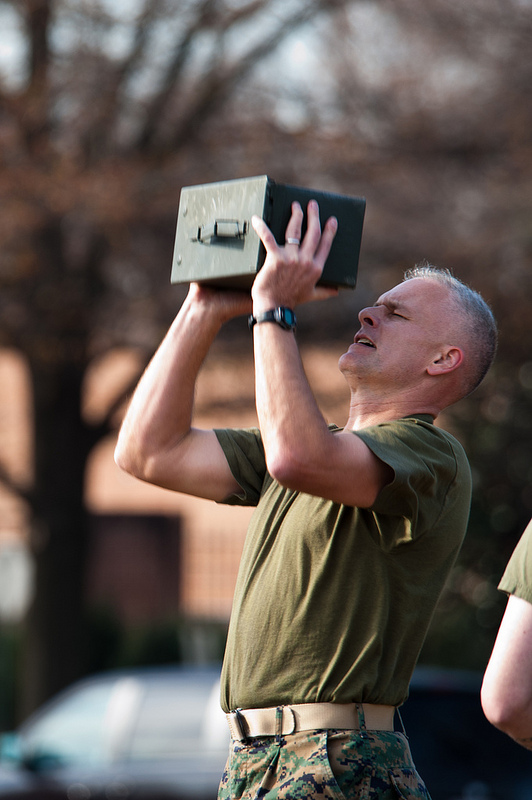
Major General Vaughn Ary, Staff Judge Advocate to the Commandant displays lifting 30 lb ammo can 100 times during combat fitness test on December 4, 2011.

This test was implemented in mid-2008 by Commandant of the Marine Corps James T. Conway as a more combat oriented version of, but supplement to, the Physical Fitness Test.

=== Scoring ===
Marine Corps CFT scoring became more stringent after 2017, and are scored the following way for males:

Movement to contact

Age 17-20: A perfect score of 100 is earned by completing this task in 2 minutes and 40 seconds or less. The minimum passing score is 3 minutes and 45 seconds.

Age 21-25: A perfect score of 100 is earned by completing this task in 2 minutes and 38 seconds or less. The minimum passing score is 3 minutes and 45 seconds.

Age 26-30: A perfect score of 100 is earned by completing this task in 2 minutes and 39 seconds or less. The minimum passing score is 3 minutes and 48 seconds.

Age 31-35: A perfect score of 100 is earned by completing this task in 2 minutes and 42 seconds or less. The minimum passing score is 3 minutes and 51 seconds.

Age 36-40: A perfect score of 100 is earned by completing this task in 2 minutes and 45 seconds or less. The minimum passing score is 3 minutes and 58 seconds.

Age 41-45: A perfect score of 100 is earned by completing this task in 2 minutes and 52 seconds or less. The minimum passing score is 4 minutes and 11 seconds.

Age 46-50: A perfect score of 100 is earned by completing this task in 3 minutes and 1 seconds or less. The minimum passing score is 4 minutes and 28 seconds.

Age 51+: A perfect score of 100 is earned by completing this task in 3 minutes and 5 seconds or less. The minimum passing score is 5 minutes and 7 seconds.

Ammo lift

A perfect score of 100 is achieved with 91 ammo can lifts. Points are deducted as follows:

- 100 pts for 113-115 lifts
- 98 pts for 88 lifts
- 97 pts for 87-86 lifts
- 96 pts for 85 lifts
- 95 pts for 84 lifts

Then the cycle begins again (roughly it is -5 pts for every 7 lifts less than 91 lifts, down to 33 lifts).

Marine Corps CFTs are scored the following way for females (age 17-26):

Movement to contact

A perfect score of 100 is earned by completing this task in under 3 minutes and 23 seconds. One point is deducted for each additional 2 seconds up to a final time of 5 minutes and 27 seconds (5.27).

Ammo lift

A perfect score of 100 is achieved with 91 ammo can lifts. Deducting points for this event is fairly straightforward: every lift less than 60 subtracts 1 point (except for lifts 52, 53, 38, 39, 23, and 24 which only subtract 1/2 a point).

Maneuver under fire

A perfect score of 100 is earned by completing this task in under 3 minutes and 1 seconds (3.01). One point is deducted for each additional 2 seconds up to the longest time of 5 minutes and 59 seconds (5.59).
