= Model 1850 Army Staff & Field Officers' Sword =

U.S. Army sword

Model 1850 Staff and Field Officer's Sword
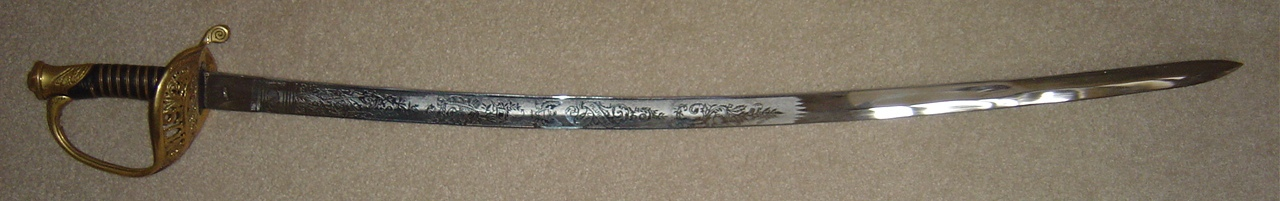
- A replica of a Model 1850 Staff and Field Officer's Sword
- Type: Dress sword
- Place of origin: United States

Service history
- In service: 1850–1872
- Used by: United States Army
- Wars: American Civil War

Specifications
- Blade length: 32 inches
- Scabbard/sheath: Leather or Steel

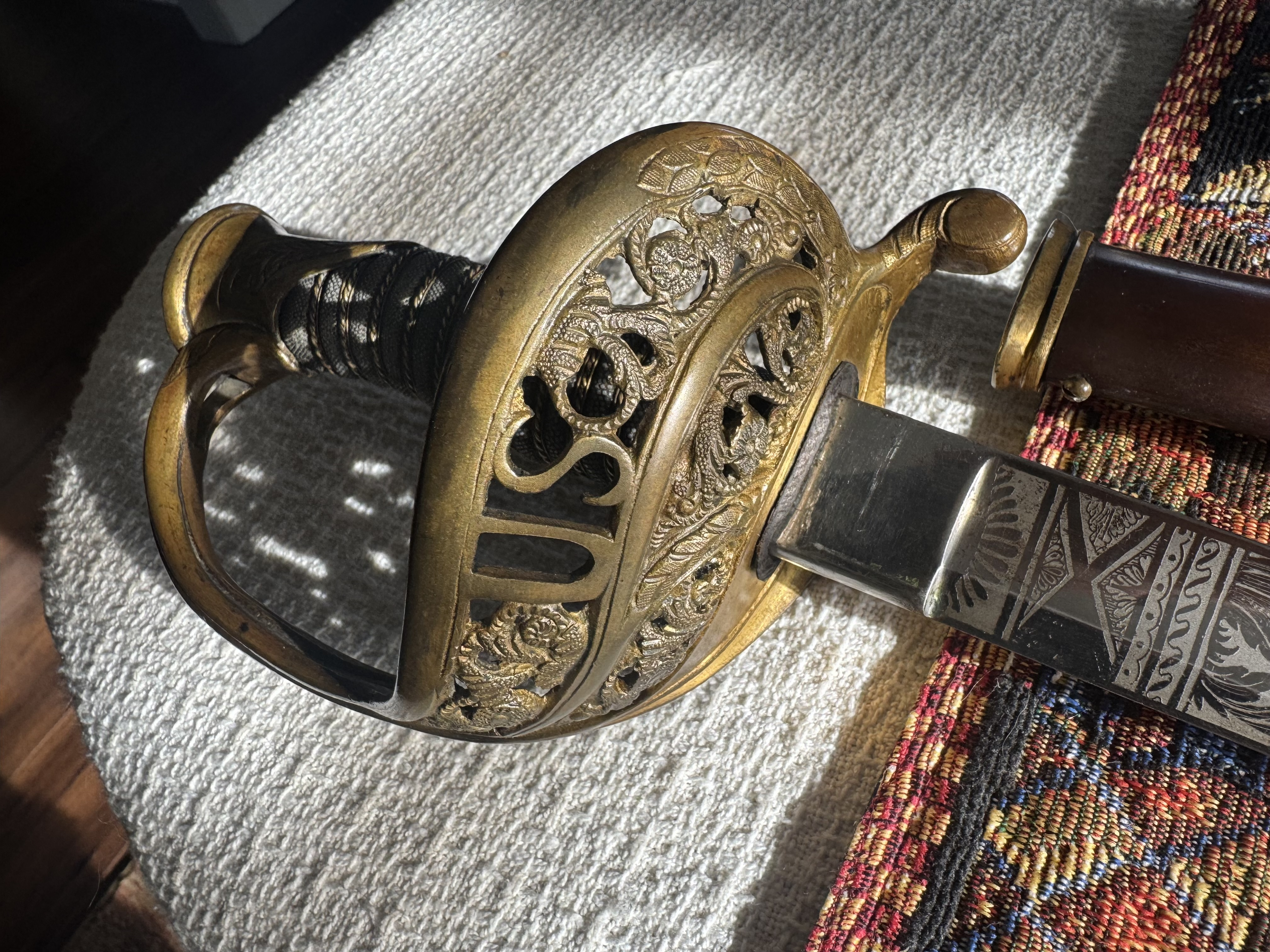
Hilt and handguard detail of a Model 1850 Staff & Field Officer Sword, this example manufactured by W. Clauberg, Solingen, Prussia.

The Model 1850 Army Staff and Field Officer's Sword was carried by all members of staff departments, Field Grade officers of Artillery and Infantry, Company Grade Officers of Light Artillery, Staff Officers and Aides-de-Camp between 1850 and 1872.

== Design ==
The Model 1860 was based on a French pattern.

== Adoption ==
Though other swords were allowed by the regulations, this model was by far the most popular sword carried by officers during the American Civil War.

During the years before the war, many Confederate officers, including General Robert E. Lee carried this sword in the Indian campaigns.

Although intended for officers of the rank of major and above, since swords were items of private purchase and not government issue, there was nothing to stop officers of any rank from owning one.

The Staff and Field Officers' Sword is distinct from the Model 1850 Army Foot Officer's Sword.
