= Model 1840 army noncommissioned officers' sword =

Model 1840 Army Noncommissioned Officer's Sword
- Type: Sword
- Place of origin: United States of America

Service history
- Used by: United States Army
- Wars: Mexican–American War; American Civil War

Production history
- Manufacturer: Ames Manufacturing Company

Specifications
- Blade length: 31 in (79 cm)
- Hilt type: Brass
- Scabbard/sheath: Leather scabbard

The Model 1840 noncommissioned officers' sword was adopted by the United States military in 1840. Based primarily on a sword used by the French Army, the model 1840 NCO proved somewhat heavy hilted and ill balanced. For over 70 years, it was widely used by the Army; today its usage is restricted to ceremonial occasions. The sword had a 31-inch (79 cm) blade (some being slightly longer), a cast brass hilt resembling the more expensive wire-wrapped leather grips, and a leather scabbard rather than the steel used by cavalry troopers and officers, although some makers, such as Emerson and Silver, issued a steel scabbard rather than leather to protect from wear. Leather scabbards were phased out beginning in 1868.

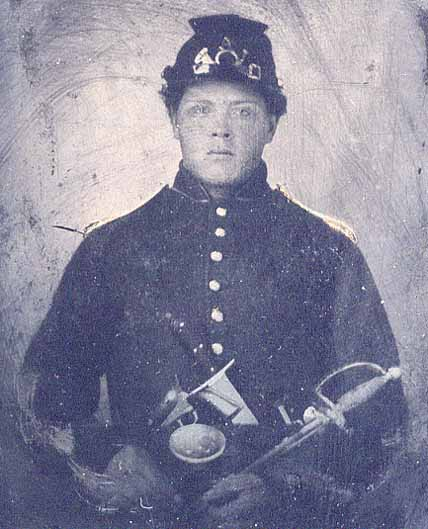
Union soldier armed with NCO sword, Bowie knife and revolver

== History ==
The sword replaced a weapon more commonly known as the Model 1832 foot artillery sword which was used by both the infantry and the artillery regiments from 1832 to 1840. Its wearing was granted to all sergeant ranks until it came out of use in 1875. Additionally first sergeants and above would wear a waist sash from 1821 to 1872. The sword was worn either on a white or black baldric or with an Enfield bayonet frog. A shorter version with a 26-inch blade was carried by musicians, this was called the Model 1840 musicians' sword.

The M1840 has had a long service life, seeing frontline service from the Mexican–American War to the American Civil War until the Spanish–American War. During the Civil War it wasn't always issued to volunteer regiments.

The primary contractor for the production of the M1840 NCO sword seems to have been the Ames Manufacturing Company. During the Civil War multiple companies were contracted by the U.S. government to manufacture edged weapons alongside Ames. Two of these companies, Emerson and Silver and Christopher Roby, manufactured M1840 NCO swords. The weapon was made with a blunt edge as swords at the time were sharpened only when they were expected to be used in action. The narrow blade was a compromise between cut and thrust actions, yet the thick spine favors stabbing over than slashing techniques. It was the main weapon of standard bearers (along with the Colt Army Model 1860 and Colt 1851 navy revolver) and hospital stewards, as well as a secondary weapon for infantry NCOs. The sword was also used by the Confederates who captured many after seizing state arsenals.

In 1868 the ordnance board recommended that no more leather sword, or bayonet scabbards be purchased, so after the leather ones were used up, a black Japanned steel scabbard was substituted, along with a new pattern leather frog. It remained in service as a ceremonial weapon until general orders No. 77 dated August 6, 1875 discontinued its use. A modern version of this sword with steel scabbard is currently permitted for wear by US Army platoon sergeants and first sergeants; in practice it is rarely seen outside the 3rd Infantry Regiment (the "Old Guard") and honor guards. Some army NCOs have this sword and wear it for social occasions, regardless of duty as a platoon sergeant or first sergeant. It is also widely used in Sergeants major promotion and retirement ceremonies, and at the United States Army Sergeants Major Academy at Fort Bliss, TX.
