= MCRD San Diego Command Museum =

Museum in San Diego, California, US

Coordinates: 32°44′30″N 117°11′52″W

- Established: November 10, 1987
- Location: Day Hall, Building 26; Marine Corps Recruit Depot San Diego; San Diego, California; United States
- Type: Military History
- Visitors: 150,000 yearly
- Director: Joanie Schwarz-Wetter

The MCRD San Diego Command Museum is a museum in Marine Corps Recruit Depot San Diego in San Diego, California. It exhibits historical items relating to the United States Marine Corps. It opened on November 10, 1987, and was officially designated as a command museum on January 8, 1993. It is located in Day Hall, Building 26.

== See also ==
- United States Marine Corps Boot Camp
