= Raj Karega Khalsa =

Sikh slogan

Raj Karega Khalsa (Punjabi: ਰਾਜ ਕਰੇਗਾ ਖਾਲਸਾ, romanized: Rāja karēgā khālasā, lit. 'the pure will rule') is a slogan representing the Sikh idea of sovereignty and it is recited at the conclusion of Ardas. Originally, the phrase was part of a short couplet that later came to become part of the daily Sikh supplication prayer.

The complete quote is ' Raaj Karega Khalsa, Aaki Rahe Na Koye'. Means only the Pure soul will rule over this world, aaki(opposite of Khalsa i.e. pure or pawitar) the enemy, the enemy here means, enemy of the soul like anger, lust, attachment, ego, greed will not be there, they will be defeated by the purity of the soul

== Description ==
Raj Karega Khalsa, lit. "the Khalsa shall rule," a phrase expressive of the will of the Sikh people to sovereignty, is part of the anthem which follows the litany or ardas recited at the end of every religious service of the Sikhs. Another view is that it refers to spiritual conquest of one's mind and achieving mukti (liberation) rather than territorial sovereignty. While the ardas is said by an officiant or any Sikh leading the sangat standing and facing Guru Granth Sahib, the anthem is recited aloud in unison by everyone present, with responses from the assembly.

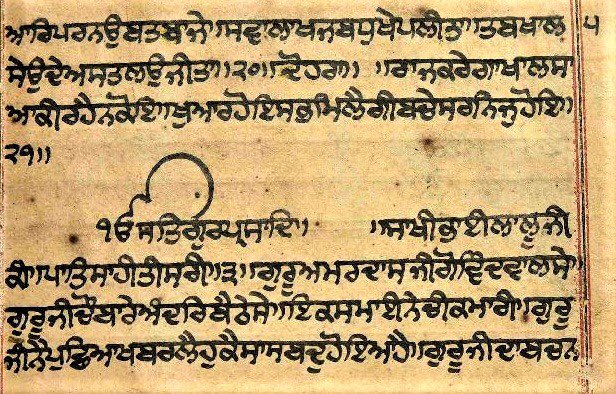
Raj Karega Khalsa section of an early 18th or 19th century manuscript of the Tankahnama by Bhai Nand Lal

Scholars date the composition to the year 1718 but scholar Harjinder Singh argues it was written down earlier between the years 1699–1708, originating in the ghazals of Bhai Nand Lal.

While not present in early Sikh scripture, it is found in the third dohra, or couplet, of Guru Gobind Singh's Guru Maneyo Granth verse, conferred upon the congregation upon the founding of the Khalsa in 1699. The couplet "Raj Karega Khalsa, Aki Rahe Na Koe. Khuar Hue Sabh Milenge, Bache Saran Jo Hoe" (The pure shall rule, no opponent will remain, those separated will unite and all the devotees shall be saved) is also attested at the end of Bhai Nand Lal Singh's Rehitnama.

The relevant portion of the original ardās which was recited in history is:

Delhi Takht Par Bahegi Aap Guru Ki Fauj,
Chattar Firega Sees Par Badi Karegi Mauj,
Raaj Karega Khalsa Aaakki Rahe Na Koye,
Khuaar Hoye Sab Milainge Bache Sharan Jo Hoye

The colonial British banned parts of this ardās as they feared its martial and potential political implications. Therefore, they mentioned not to say the first two stanzas and only start with "Raj Karega Khalsa. The translated ardās with the preceding lines included is:

On the Delhi throne, the Army of the Guru will sit,
The imperial umbrella will float over their heads and they will enjoy bliss,
The Khalsa will rule and no rebels shall exist,
The areas and people who are missing will be reunited, those who take refuge in it will be saved.

When the appropriate time came, the Sikh Army, in the command of Baba Baghel Singh, Sardar Jassa Singh Ahluwalia, Sardar Jassa Singh Ramgarhia and few other chieftains, conquered Delhi and did seva (service) of all the historical gurdwaras of Delhi. Even after conquering, they didn’t claim the crown and simply asked the ruler of Delhi to rule with “conscience” and not to put the ‘jizya’ tax on non Muslims. There are many places in Delhi showing the invasion of Delhi by Sikh Army, including Tis Hazari, Mori gate and many more.

The phrase symbolizes Sikh sovereignty, with W. H. McLeod translating it as follows:

raj kareg Khalsa, ak rahahi na ko.
khvar hoi sabb milainge, bachahi saran jo hoi.

Translation:

The Khalsa shall rule, no enemy shall remain.
All who endure suffering and privation shall be brought to the safety of the Guru’s protection.

—W. H. McLeod (1989)
