= United States Marine Corps Physical Fitness Test =

U.S. Marine Corps fitness test

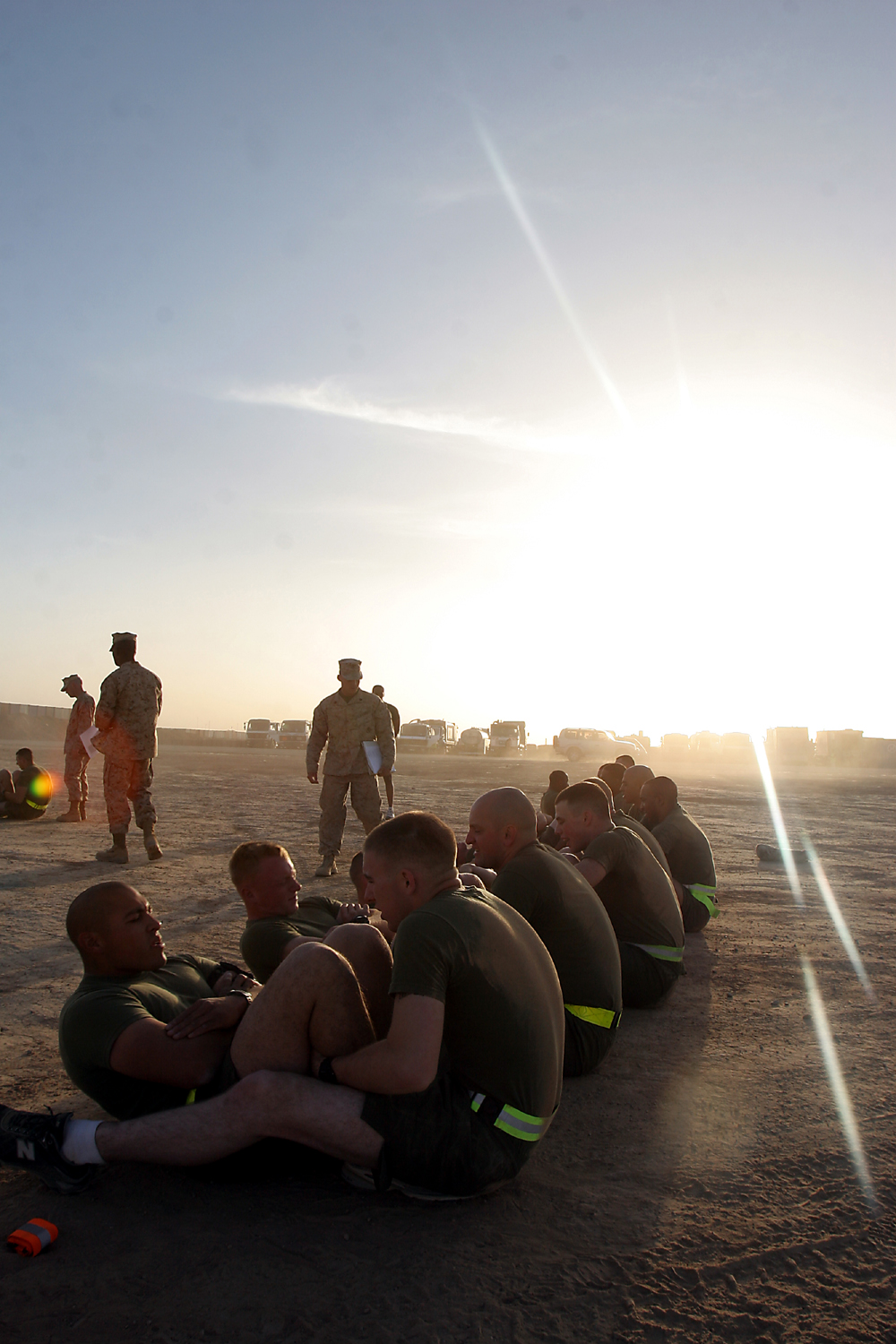
Number of crunches depends on age for a perfect score of 100 points for this event

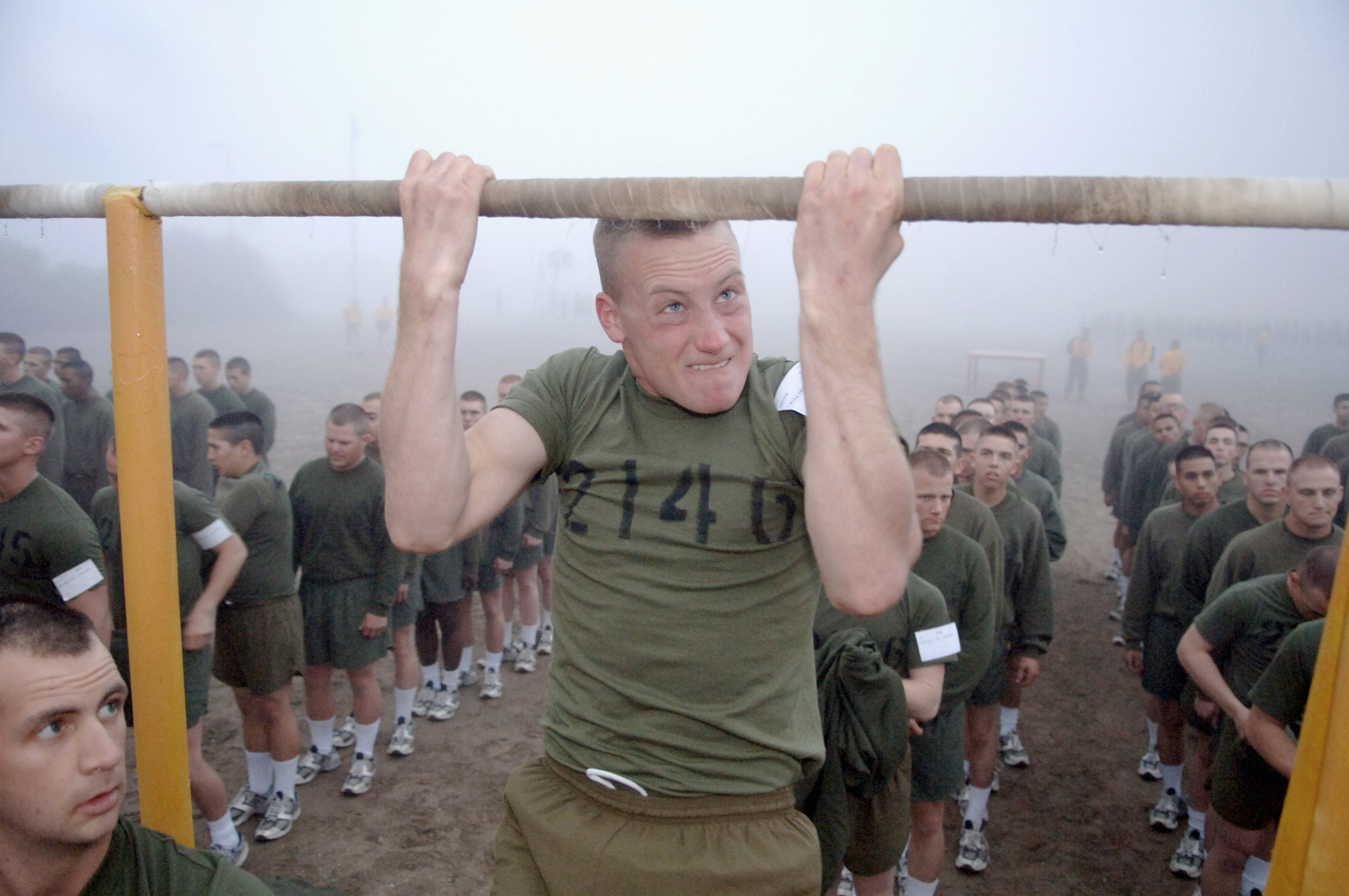
A Marine recruit performs pull-ups

A perfect score is achieved by completing the three-mile run in less than 18 minutes

The United States Marine Corps requires that all Marines perform a Physical Fitness Test (PFT) and a Combat Fitness Test (CFT) once each calendar year. The PFT is conducted between January 1 and June 30, and the CFT is conducted between July 1 and December 31. The same standards apply for reservists.

The PFT is a collective measure of general fitness Marine Corps-wide, and consists of three events:

1. Dead-hang pull-ups or push-ups
2. Abdominal crunches or planks
3. Three-mile run (or 5000-meter row, if requirements are met)

On October 1, 2008, the Marine Corps introduced an additional pass/fail CFT to the fitness requirements. The CFT is designed to measure abilities demanded of Marines in a war zone.

== Tests ==
=== Pull-ups or push-ups ===
For this test, Marines choose to either perform pull-ups or push-ups. However, the maximum score is only attainable if pull-ups are chosen.

The pull-ups may be done with either an overhand (pronated) grip or an underhand (supinated) "chin-up" grip. Changes in grip are allowed as long as the feet do not touch the ground and only the hands come in contact with the pull-up bar. The pull-up begins at the "dead-hang" with arms extended and the body hanging motionless. A successful pull-up is performed without excess motion, the body rising until the chin is above the bar, and body lowered back to the "dead-hang" position. There is no time limit.

Until 2017, male Marines were required to perform pull-ups, and female Marines performed the flexed hang instead of the pull-up. The flexed hang was started with the chin above the pull-up bar. The timer was started and did not stop until the arms became fully extended. The feet could not touch the ground or any part of the pull-up bar at any time. The Marine Corps had originally indicated that, as of January 1, 2014, female Marines would be required to perform a minimum of three pull-ups in order to pass the PFT. However, when more than half of female recruits were unable to meet this standard, the change was delayed. In 2017, the flexed-arm hang event was eliminated, and both male and female Marines were given the choice to do either push-ups or pull-ups for this event.

=== Crunches or planks ===
Before the PFT, Marines will indicate if they will attempt the plank or the abdominal crunch.

The abdominal crunch event is a timed event where the Marine must perform as many crunches as possible in two minutes.

The plank event consists of maintaining a proper plank position for as long as possible or until the max time to earn 100 points. The planking form prescribed is that forearms, toes, and fists or palms in contact with the floor at all times. The body must remain flat and parallel to the deck. The Marine must hold this position as long as possible with no pauses. Marines must achieve a duration 3:45 for a maximum score.

=== Run or row ===
The three-mile run event is a timed event where the Marine runs exactly three miles on reasonably flat ground, not on a treadmill, either indoors or outdoors, as quickly as possible.

Marines satisfying any of the following requirements can, instead of running, opt to row 5000 meters on a rowing ergometer:

- 46 years or older
- Injured (with appropriate approval)
- In postpartum period (with appropriate approval)

== Scoring ==
The scoring for each event in the test is dependent upon a Marine's sex and age group in all events, except for planking where all sexes and ages use the same scoring scale.

The minimum combined score required to pass the PFT is 150. The maximum possible score is 300.

Event scoring is designed so meeting the minimum score in each event is not enough to pass the PFT; additional points must be scored in at least one event to meet the passing threshold overall. Failure to meet the minimum requirement in any one event results in the failure of the entire test, regardless of the overall score.

Marines who pass the test are classified into classes based on performance:

- 1st class — 235 to 300
- 2nd class — 200 to 234
- 3rd class — 150 to 199
