= Hooah =

U.S. Army, Air Force, and Space Force battle cry

Hooah /ˈhuːɑː/ is a battle cry used by members of the United States Army. Originally spelled "Hough", the battle cry was first used by members of the 2nd Cavalry Regiment during the Second Seminole War in 1841, after Seminole chief Coacoochee toasted officers of the regiment with a loud "Hough!", apparently meaning "How d'ye do!" Since WWII, the word has been widely used throughout the U.S. Army and gained a more general meaning of "anything and everything except 'no'".

It is comparable to Oorah as used in the United States Marine Corps.

== Possible meanings ==
Some popular usages of hooah include:

- HUA means: "Heard, understood, and acknowledged" Also "Head Up Ass"

== See also ==
- Cheering
- HOOAH! Bar – a US military energy bar
- Hooyah – the United States Navy and United States Coast Guard equivalent
- Huzzah – a 16th-century equivalent
- Oorah (battle cry) – the United States Marine Corps equivalent
