= Hooyah =

Exclamation used by the United States Navy

Hooyah is the battle cry used in the United States Navy to build morale and signify verbal acknowledgment. It originated with special operations communities, especially the Navy SEALs, and was subsequently adopted by other Navy divisions.

It is comparable to Oorah in the United States Marine Corps and Hooah in the United States Army, the United States Air Force, and the United States Space Force.

== See also ==
- Hooah—the United States Army and United States Air Force equivalent
- Huzzah
- Oorah—the United States Marine Corps equivalent
