= Huzzah =

Exclamation

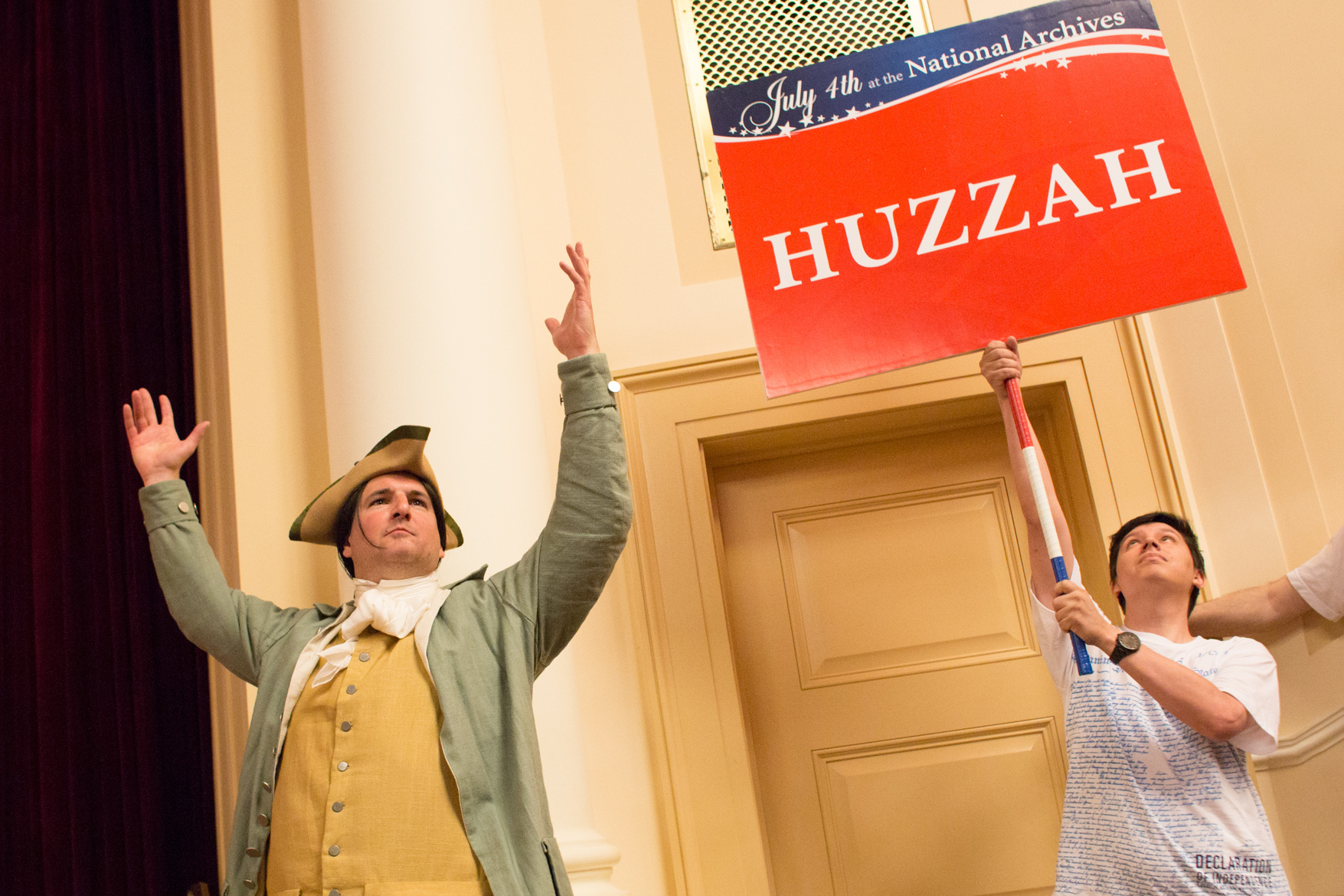
"Huzzah" on a sign at a Fourth of July celebration

Huzzah (sometimes written hazzah; originally spelled huzza and pronounced huh-ZAY, now often pronounced as huh-ZAH; in most modern varieties of English hurrah or hooray) is, according to the Oxford English Dictionary (OED), "apparently a mere exclamation". The dictionary does not mention any specific derivation. Whatever its origins, it has seen occasional literary use since at least the time of Shakespeare, as the first use was in 1573, according to Merriam-Webster.

== Use ==
Huzzah may be categorised with such interjections as hoorah and hooray. According to the Oxford English Dictionary, "In English, the form hurrah is literary and dignified; hooray is usual in popular acclamation".

In common usage, such as cheers at sporting events and competitions, the speaker need not make distinction, and the words are distinguished by regional dialect and accent.

=== Origin and military usage ===
The origin of the word in its various forms is unclear, but it may have been influenced by war cries from various languages: the Oxford English Dictionary (OED) suggests Norse, Dutch, Russian and Prussian words that may have played a part.

Contrary to popular belief, the word does not appear in William Shakespeare's original works. Written in three parts around 1591, Shakespeare's I, II, and III Henry VI were condensed by Charles Kemble in 1888 into a single text titled, Henry VI. Though Kemble's condensed version records the last line of Act III, Scene III as, "All. Huzza ! huzza ! huzza !— Long live the King !", this line does not appear in Shakespeare's original text, but is rather Kemble's own insertion between II Henry VI, Act IV, Scenes VIII and IX.

Often incorrectly used at Renaissance fairs and American Revolution reenactment, Huzzah was originally spelled "Huzza" and pronounced "huz-ZAY". In late 18th-century literature, words like "say", "play", and "day" were used to rhyme with Huzza, as in the song Keppel Forever:

"Bonfires, bells did ring; Keppel was all the ding,
Music did play;
Windows with candles in, for all to honor him:
People aloud did sing, 'Keppel! Huzza!'"

The OED notes that in the 17th and 18th centuries, it was identified as a sailor's cheer or salute, and suggests it was possibly related to words like heeze and hissa, which are cognates of hoist.

In the 18th and early 19th centuries, three 'huzzahs' were given by British Army infantry before a bayonet charge, as a way of building their morale and intimidating the enemy. In the book Redcoat: The British Soldier in the Age of Horse and Musket, military historian Richard Holmes indicates that this was given as two short 'huzzahs', followed by a third sustained one as the charge was carried out.

== See also ==
- Hip hip hooray
- Hooah
- Hooray Henry
- Hooyah
- Oorah
