= United States Marine Corps Recruit Training =

Program of initial training for USMC recruits

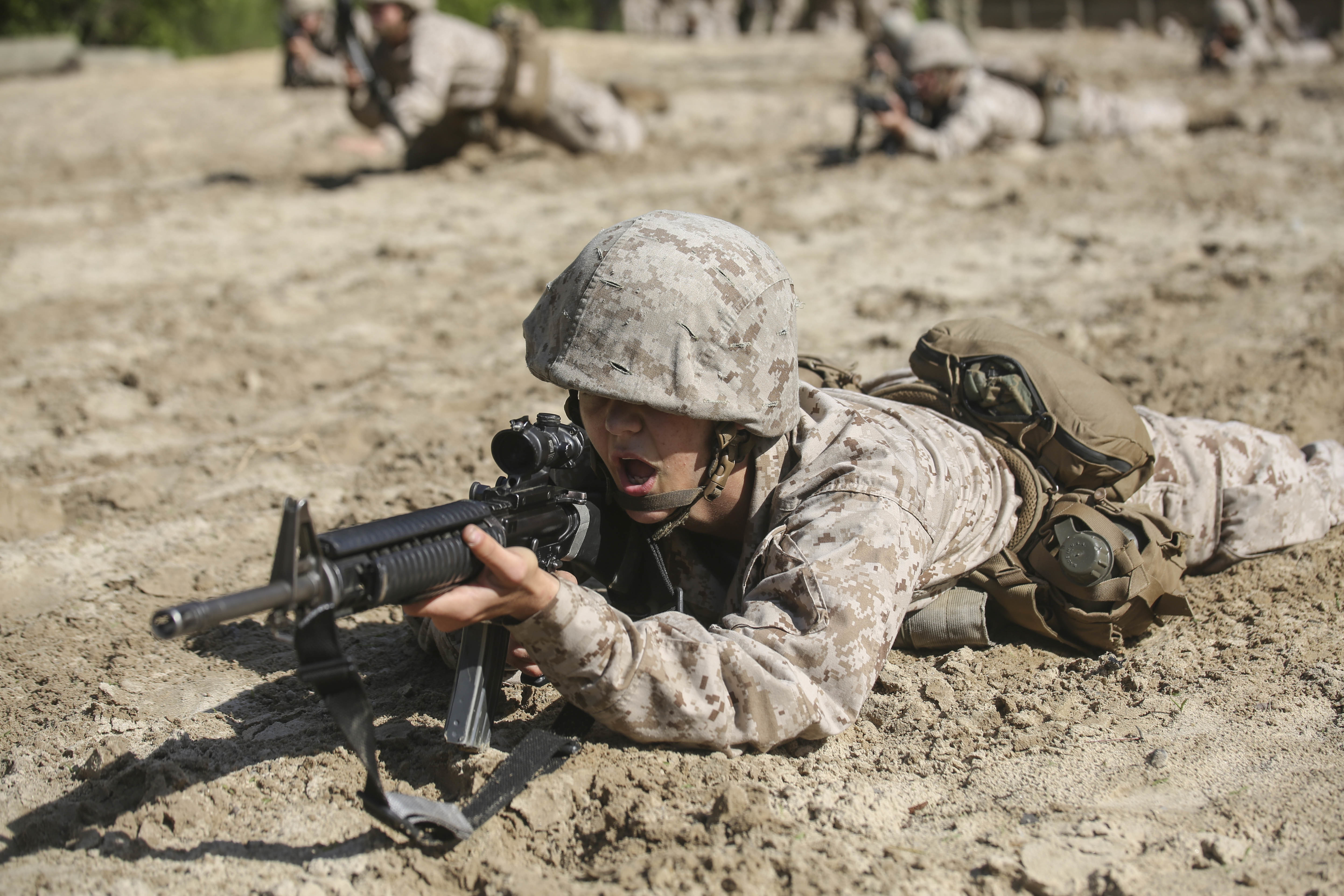
Recruits learn marksmanship fundamentals and must qualify with the M16 rifle to graduate.

United States Marine Corps Recruit Training (commonly known as "boot camp") is a 13-week recruit training program, including in & out-processing, that each recruit must successfully complete in order to serve in the United States Marine Corps.

Most enlisted individuals entering the Marine Corps, regardless of eventual active or reserve duty status, will undergo recruit training at one of the two Marine Corps Recruit Depots (MCRD): MCRD Parris Island or MCRD San Diego. Male recruits from the 8th, 9th and 12th recruiting districts (areas west of the Mississippi River except Louisiana and including parts of Illinois, Indiana, Wisconsin and Michigan) are sent to MCRD San Diego. All recruits from the 1st, 4th and 6th recruiting districts (and until 2021, all female recruits) are sent to Parris Island. Those desiring to become officers attend training at Officer Candidates School at Marine Corps Base Quantico in Virginia.

The only Marine Corps recruits not required to undergo such training are those selected for the United States Marine Band. Upon passing an audition and satisfying security and physical fitness requirements, they are granted the rank of Staff Sergeant and assigned exclusively to the band for a four-year enlistment.

== History ==
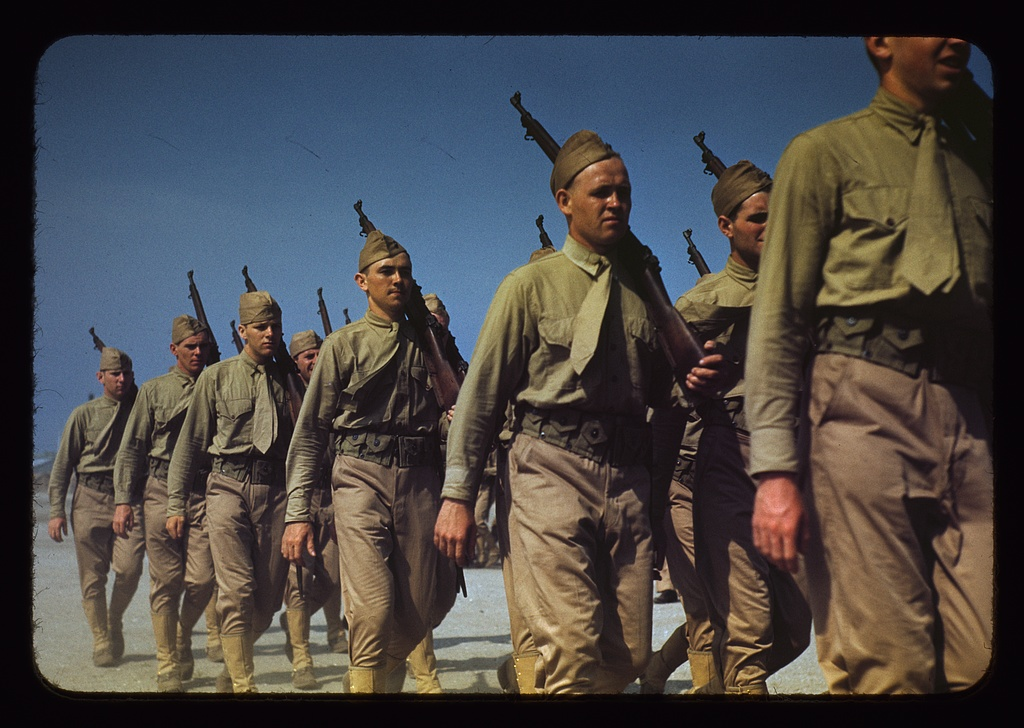
Recruits near the end of training at MCRD Parris Island, May 1942

In the earliest years of the Corps, training was performed by the individual Marine barracks where the individual was recruited before being assigned to a permanent post. Marine non-commissioned officers were responsible for instructing privates in discipline, drill, weapons handling and other skills. In approximately 1808, Commandant Franklin Wharton established a formal school for recruits at Marine Barracks, Washington, D.C., but no records indicate that this served as a centralized recruit depot, and the training regimen remained inconsistent and primitive because of manpower shortages and lack of funding. For example, recruits at Washington were hastily formed into a battalion in July 1861 and drilled as they marched on their way to the First Battle of Bull Run.

In 1911, Commandant William P. Biddle standardized a mandatory two-month recruit training program (including drill, physical exercise, personal combat and intensive marksmanship qualification with the M1903 Springfield rifle) and set up four training depots at Philadelphia, Norfolk, Puget Sound and Mare Island, California. In 1912, Mare Island became the sole training depot for the west coast. In 1915, the Norfolk depot was shifted to its current location at Parris Island, and was merged with the Philadelphia depot. As the United States entered World War I, the number of recruits being trained surged from 835 at any given time to a peak of 13,286, while follow-on training was provided at Quantico and in France. During the summer of 1923, the West Coast recruit depot was moved from Mare Island to its current location in San Diego, and the training program was modified to include three weeks of basic indoctrination and three weeks on the rifle range; the final two weeks were occupied in bayonet drill, guard duty, drill and ceremonies.

With the September 1939 Nazi German invasion of Poland, Congress authorized an increase in manpower in preparation for a possible entry of the United States into World War II and the Marine Corps recruit training syllabus was halved to four weeks to accommodate the influx of personnel. After standards and marksmanship plummeted as a result, the seven-week schedule was returned and additional training was given at Camp Lejeune or Camp Pendleton, based on specialties, before being assigned to a unit. An additional segregated depot was established at Montford Point for roughly 20,000 African American recruits; integration occurred by 1949. Overall, half a million recruits were trained by the end of the war at the three depots.

During the Korean War, training was shortened from ten weeks to eight but was returned afterward to ten. The Ribbon Creek incident in 1956 led to considerable scrutiny and reform in recruit training, such as an additional layer of command oversight. During the early 1960s, the training period was increased to 13 weeks, including three weeks of marksmanship training at the Rifle Range. The Vietnam War-era syllabus was shortened to nine weeks and again saw infantry recruits attend follow-on training at Lejeune and Pendleton.

== Overview ==
In Helmet for My Pillow, his World War II memoir, journalist Robert Leckie writes of Marine Corps Recruit Training:

It is a process of surrender. At every turn, at every hour, it seemed, a habit or a preference had to be given up, an adjustment had to be made. Even in the mess hall we learned that nothing mattered so little as a man's own likes or dislikes ... Worst in this process of surrender was the ruthless refusal to permit a man the slightest privacy.

Leckie adds: "If you are undone in Parris Island, taken apart in those first few weeks, it is at the rifle range that they start to put you together again".

=== Marine Boot Camp Structure ===
Duration: 13 weeks

Locations:

- MCRD San Diego (for recruits west of the Mississippi)
- MCRD Parris Island (for recruits east of the Mississippi)

Phases:

1. Phase 1 (Weeks 1–4) – Forming, discipline, drill, initial strength tests, swim qualification.
2. Phase 2 (Weeks 5–9) – Rifle marksmanship, field training, combat conditioning.
3. Phase 3 (Weeks 10–13) – The Crucible, final testing, and earning the title “Marine.”

Daily structure: 0400–2100, constant motion, strict schedules, physical training, marching, drill, and classes. Recruits average 12–15 miles of travel on their feet per day, usually wearing boots.

=== Daily schedule ===
A day typically begins at 0400 hours, or 4:00 AM. Reveille is sounded, and all recruits present themselves for accountability. After personal hygiene and morning clean-up, recruits perform physical training (on Monday through Saturday). After the morning meal, the recruits begin the day's scheduled training, which may include classes, drills or martial arts. On Sundays, recruits are offered the morning to attend various religious services and take personal time ("square-away time"); the latter may be used to engage in personal activities such as writing letters, working out, doing laundry, or preparing uniforms and equipment.

After the noon meal, the day's training continues until the evening meal, typically around 17:00 to 18:00 (5:00 to 6:00 pm). After this time, recruits will have hygiene time to shower and clean their weapons and the barracks. Recruits are then given approximately one hour of square-away time, during which they remain under the supervision of their drill instructors (DIs) and may not leave the squad bay. In preparation to sleep, recruits may hydrate, pray together for five minutes, ensure footlockers and rifles are locked and often recite the Rifleman's Creed or Marines' Hymn before lights-out. Lights-out can range from 20:00 to 22:00 (8:00 to 10:00 pm), depending on the next day's activities. Throughout all of recruit training, a guard, or ”firewatch", is posted for the entire night. Four recruits at a time stand one-hour shifts, during which they keep order in the squad bay, clean, or carry out any tasks assigned by the DIs. Extra firewatch is frequently assigned as punishment for minor infractions.

=== Organizational structure ===
Recruits are organized by regiment, battalion, company, platoon, squad and often fireteam. A Recruit Training Regiment is composed of three recruit training battalions for males and one battalion to train female recruits. All three of the male battalions are made up of four companies, while the female battalions comprise three companies. Each company is broken down into two series, designated as Lead and Follow, which may have between one and four platoons, depending on the number of recruits in the company at the time the training cycle begins. Each company is much like a class at a civilian education institution; each company begins and finishes recruit training together (with the exception of those who are dropped for medical or personal reasons to a different company), thus each of the companies will be at a different stage in the thirteen-week training cycle.

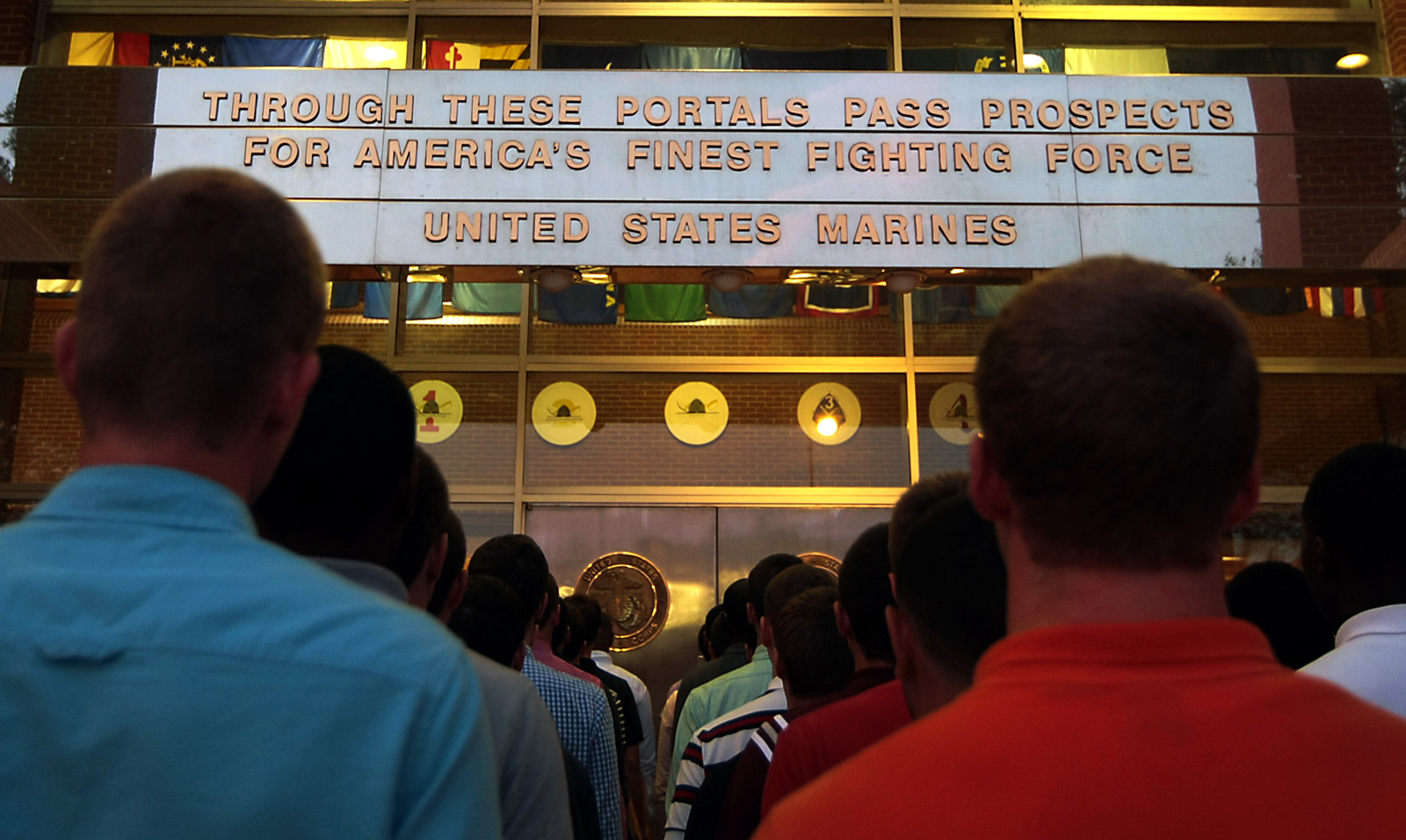
New recruits prepare to step through the silver doors of the receiving building at MCRD Parris Island, an action which symbolizes the transition from civilians to recruits and the beginning of them becoming United States Marines.

Each series is broken down into a number of platoons, usually from two to four in each. These platoons will be the basic unit for recruit training, assigned a four digit number as identification. Drill instructors are assigned to each platoon and will usually stay from the beginning to the end of training. The senior drill instructor of each platoon will select recruits to billets of responsibility, to mimic command and staff positions of a Marine unit. The selections often change on the whims of the drill instructors and can include:

- The platoon guide, the senior-most recruit responsible for carrying the platoon's guidon
- Four squad leaders, each in charge of one-fourth of the platoon; DIs may choose to further subdivide their squads into four-man fire teams
- A scribe, responsible for maintaining administrative records such as the interior guard schedule
- A whiskey locker recruit, known as a whiskey pig, responsible for maintaining the platoon's supplies
- House mouse, who cleans the normally off-limits drill instructors' offices
- A Prac/Knowledge recruit, responsible for leading the platoon in memorizing and reciting academic knowledge

=== Drill Instructors ===
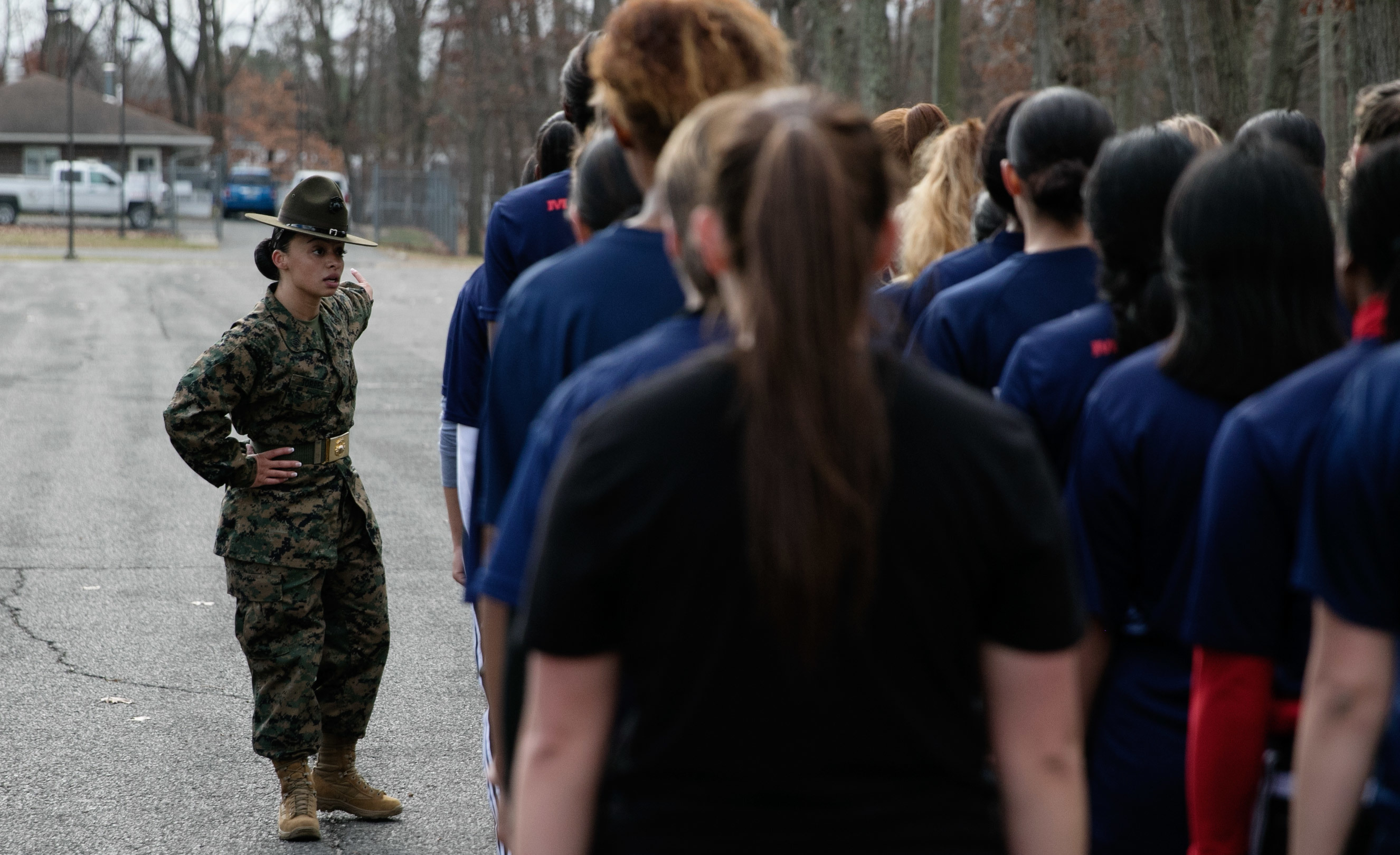
A drill instructor directing Marine poolees

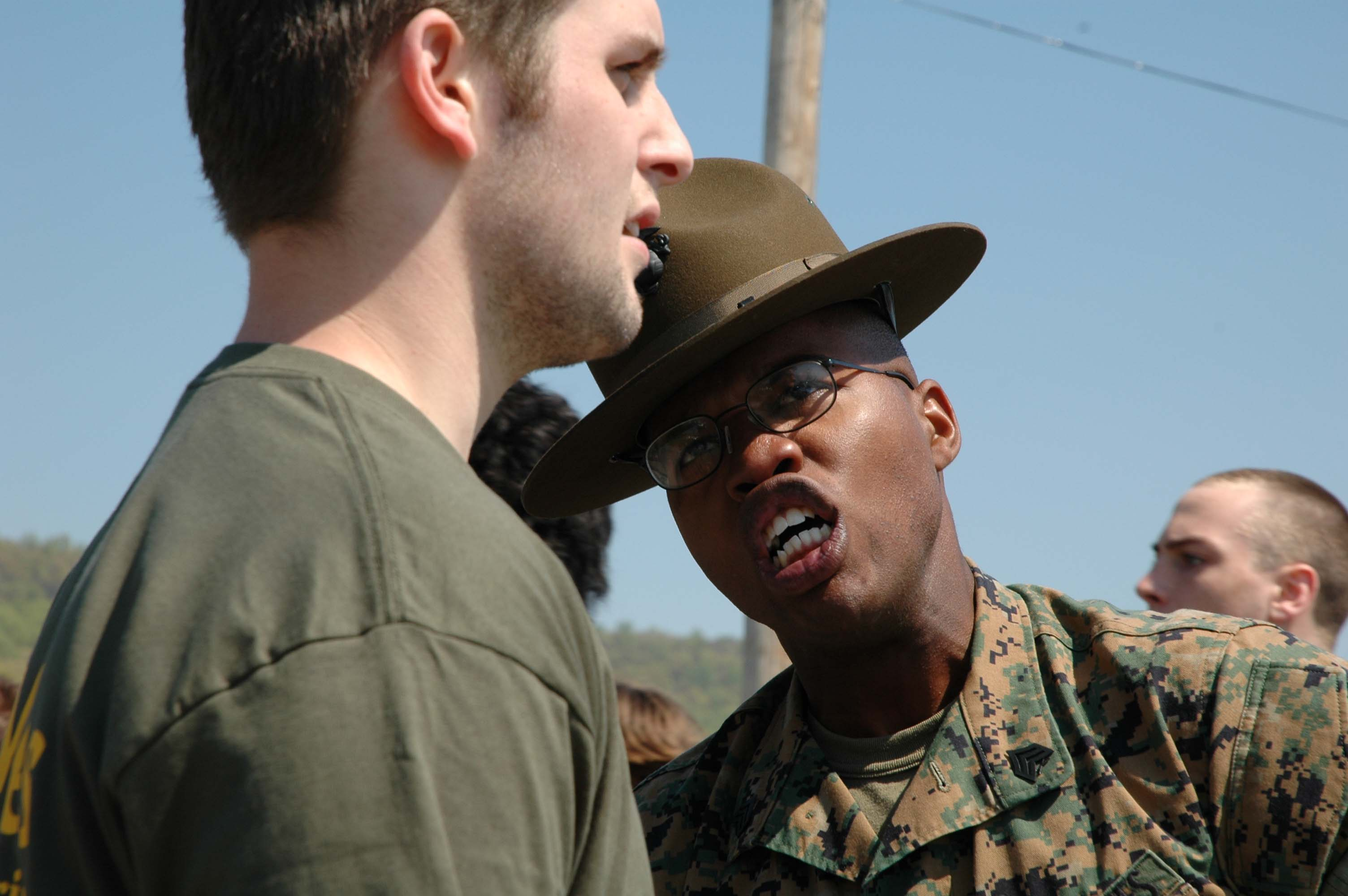
A drill instructor yells at a delayed entry program poolee.

The drill instructor (DI) serves a central role in the training of Marine recruits. Trainees are frequently met with psychological tactics, typically verbal abuse, by the DI to invoke a sense of fear, discipline, dedication, and other traits that the instructor deems desirable. As one magazine describes it:

[T]he Marine boot still steps from the recruit train with 74 other victims in his platoon to face crushing defeat at the hands of a merciless staff-sergeant drill instructor and his two assistants. For eight weeks, the DI attacks his blundering confusion with rigid discipline and a blistering barrage of vocal abuse until the boot is bullied and battered into a Marine. He's a "meathead," "goon," "skinhead," "idiot," "yardbird," or "numb" ... Slightest mistakes are greeted with tirades. To a sheepish boot who blinks at him during a chewing out, the DI roars. "Eyes front! Why do you stare at me? Do I fascinate you, meathead?" ... During vicious upbraidings, [the recruit] is continually reminded that he should have joined the Army instead of the Marine Corps.

In his World War II memoir With the Old Breed, Eugene Sledge describes Corporal Doherty, his DI, as having:

[T]he coldest, meanest green [eyes] I ever saw. He glared at us like a wolf whose first and foremost desire was to tear us limb from limb. He gave me the impression that the only reason he didn’t do so was that the Marine Corps wanted to use us for cannon fodder to absorb Japanese bullets and shrapnel so genuine Marines could be spared to capture Japanese positions ... Most Marines recall how loudly their DIs yelled at them, but Doherty didn't yell very loudly. Instead he shouted in an icy, menacing manner that sent cold chills through us.

Sledge describes an incident in which several of the recruits in his platoon left their quarters to observe the aftermath of a nearby plane crash: "When we got back to our area, Corporal Doherty delivered one of his finest orations on the subject of recruits never leaving their assigned area without the permission of their DI. We were all impressed, particularly with the tremendous number of push-ups and other exercises we performed instead of going to noon chow." He writes:

[W]e didn't realize or appreciate the fact that the discipline we were learning in responding to orders under stress often would mean the difference later in combat—between success or failure, even living or dying ... By the end of eight grueling weeks, it had become apparent that Corporal Doherty and the other DIs had done their jobs well. We were hard physically, had developed endurance, and had learned our lessons. Perhaps more important, we were tough mentally. One of our assistant drill instructors even allowed himself to mumble that we might become Marines after all.

Sledge concludes "I disliked [Doherty], but I respected him. He had made us Marines".

Each platoon is assigned three or more DIs, sometimes informally referred to as "hats" because of their distinctive Campaign hat. The DIs of a platoon are responsible to the series commander, a level of command added below that of the company commander, as a safety measure put into place following the Ribbon Creek incident. Drill instructors are trained at the DI schools at each MCRD. Those DIs who successfully complete three years or a total of 30 months of duty are eligible to receive the Drill Instructor Ribbon.

By 2021, the two U.S Marine Corps depots in Parris Island and San Diego each had female drill instructors training female recruits.

=== Physical strength and fitness ===
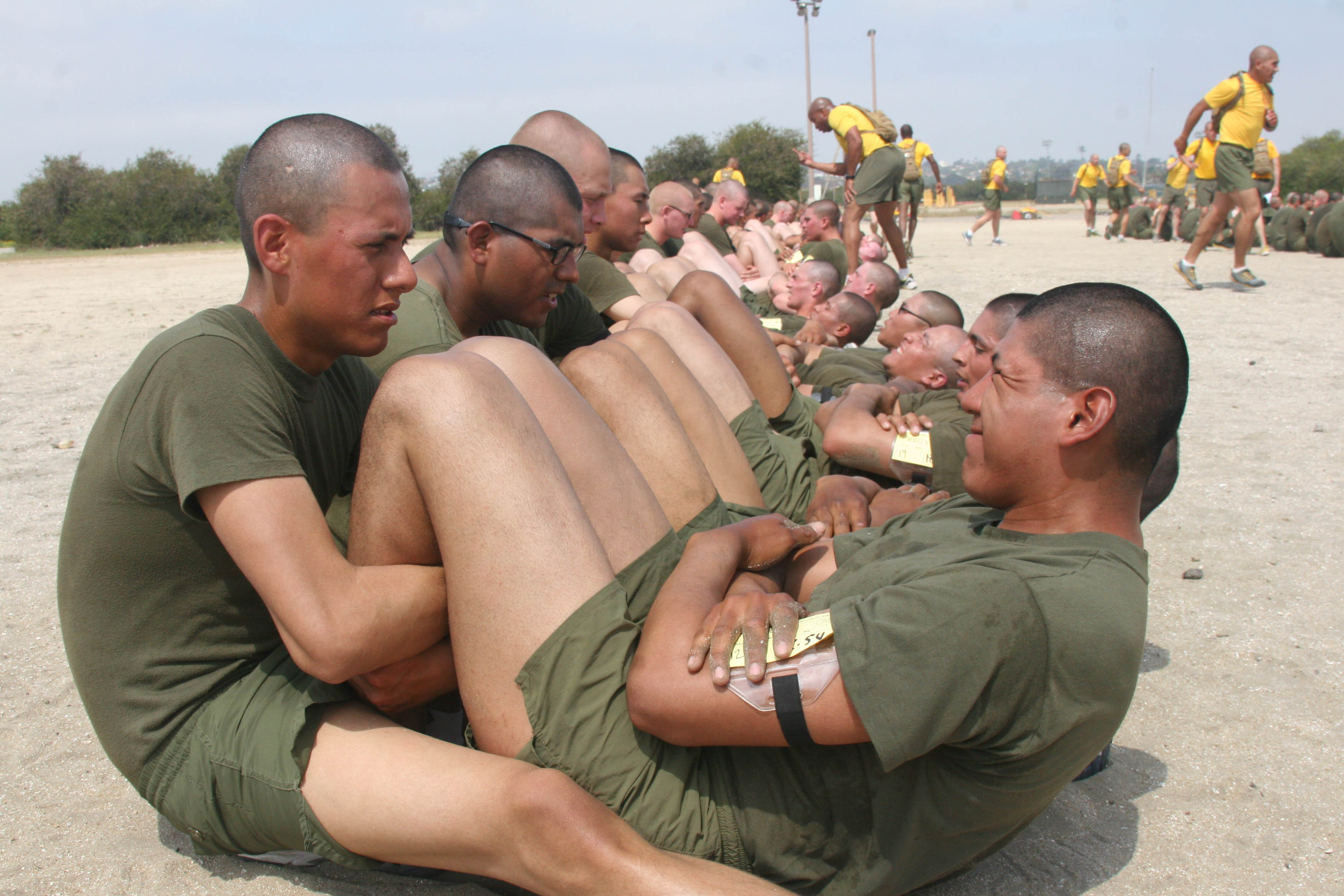
Recruits during their first PFT

The United States Marine Corps requires each recruit to pass the Initial Strength Test (IST) upon arriving to the Marine Corps Recruiting Depots. The three tests consist of pull-ups/push-ups, crunches/ planks, and a 1.5-mile run. The minimum requirements are as follows:

Initial Strength Test (IST) Minimum Requirements
Tests	Male	Female
Pull-ups/Push-ups	3 Pull-ups or 34 Push-ups	1 Pull-up or 15 Push-ups
Plank/Crunches	44 Crunches or 40 seconds Plank	44 Crunches or 40 seconds Plank
1.5 miles	13 minutes 30 seconds	15 minutes

Throughout recruit training, recruits will run the Physical Fitness Test (PFT) 2-3 times. The PFT requires higher standards on each of the three tests. Pull-ups/push-ups and crunches/planks are the same as the IST, but the run is increased to 3 miles. The requirements for each test varies depending on which group an individual falls under depending on age. Prior to 2017, women did flexed arm hangs instead of pull-ups. As a result of the change, the option of push-ups instead of pull-ups was included in the fitness tests. Any individual that chooses to do push-ups will only be able to score a maximum score of 70, compared to a maximum of 100 on all other tests.

=== Final Expected Standards ===
The 3-mile run is the final event of the PFT and evaluates stamina and cardiovascular conditioning. Minimum passing time for male recruits (ages 17-26) is 28 minutes. Minimum passing time for female recruits (ages 17-26) is 31 minutes. A perfect score (100 points) requires a time of 18 minutes or less for males, and 21 minutes or less for females. Recruits do not have a single, official 10-mile "ruck test" in boot camp, but the training program does include several progressive conditioning marches (hikes) that can be that long or longer. These hikes are part of field training and build endurance, strength, and tactical proficiency, often involving carrying gear or simulated weight. The final, culminating event of boot camp, the Crucible, involves a substantial amount of marching and physical exertion over several days.

Event	Minimum Standard (Male)	Minimum Standard (Female)	Competitive Goal (Both)
3-mile run	28:00	31:00	Sub-24:00
Pull-ups	3	1	15+
Crunches	62	62	100+
Plank	1:10	1:10	2:30+
Ruck	10–12 mi / 45 lb	10–12 mi / 45 lb	<2 hrs 30 min

=== Diet, additional fitness and medical care ===
Before arriving at recruit training, all prospective recruits undergo a physical examination by a doctor at a Military Entrance Processing Station. Recruits receive their initial weigh-in during the forming phase. If the recruit is under or over the height and weight standards, the recruit is placed on double rations if underweight or in a "diet" status if overweight. Recruits on double rations, or "double rat recruits", are given twice the usual amount of food. Conversely, diet recruits are put on a strict diet composed of fewer calories and lower-fat foods such as baked fish and rice.

All recruits receive three meals per day (also known as "chow time"), except during the Crucible. These are either served at the mess facility while in garrison, a boxed A-ration when traveling to a mess facility is not practical, or a Meal, Ready-to-Eat during field training. Meal time can last 30 minutes or less, depending on how quickly the platoon gets in line at the chow hall. Recruits are mandated a minimum of 20 minutes to consume each meal.

In some cases, recruits may fail to meet certain physical fitness standards or may inadvertently suffer an injury which prevents them from continuing training. These two types of recruits are moved from their initial training platoon and company to the Special Training Company (STC), which retains a disciplined, "boot camp" style environment while being oriented to the improvement of the individual recruit's physical and mental ability to train. The STC is divided into three platoons. While platoons in normal U.S. military parlance denote a group of around 15-20 personnel, each STC platoon is as large as necessity dictates and may often contain 500 or more recruits along with their assigned drill instructors and other personnel.

Recruits who fail the initial fitness test, as well as those who fail to perform adequately later in training, are dropped to the Physical Conditioning Platoon (PCP) at STC, informally known as the "Pork Chop Platoon" or "Donut Brigade". Recruits in PCP are engaged in a vigorous regimen of physical exercise to prepare them for re-entry into training. Recruits who are injured become part of the Medical Rehabilitation Platoon (MRP), in which they are closely monitored and treated by naval medical personnel while receiving implicit instruction about the Marine Corps and performing whatever small tasks, such as cleaning, they may be capable of. In some cases, it may be necessary for a recruit who has recovered from illness or injury in MRP may need to be moved to PCP to regain an appropriate level of physical fitness and avoid further injury or illness before they eventually rejoin a training platoon.

Finally, there is the Evaluative Holding Platoon (EHP). This is a generalized platoon that encompasses all recruits who for any reason are unable to continue with their training platoon and are being evaluated for possible discharge. This platoon may include recruits who have failed to adapt to the conditions of the Marine Corps' boot camp or have refused to continue training. Any recruit in Special Training Company is carefully assessed for physical, mental and moral fitness and when he or she is considered to be prepared to resume training will generally be placed with a platoon at the last training level the recruit had completed.

Medical care is provided by the Naval medical personnel: doctors, physician assistants and corpsmen.

=== Rivalry ===
The intense nature of recruit training lends itself to competition and rivalry between recruits at every level, from squads and platoons up to the rivalry between the two recruit depots. Each platoon in a given company competes to win trophies for having the highest collective scores in marksmanship, close order drill, academic testing and the final physical fitness test. Platoons that do poorly are sometimes nicknamed the "booger" platoon. In addition to the formal tests, platoons will continuously compete in everyday activities. The most frequent competitions involve seeing which platoon can recite knowledge the loudest. While each company will be at a different point in the training cycle at a given time and thus not able to compete directly, graduates and drill instructors foster an atmosphere of friendly rivalry. However, the rivalry between MCRDs Parris Island and San Diego is much more pronounced. Marines trained at San Diego are often referred to as "Hollywood Marines" because of the base's location in Southern California.

== Training schedule ==
Recruit training is 13 weeks, which includes a week of receiving followed by 12 rigorous weeks of training. In February 2018, the Marine Corps added a 4th phase to the matrix that previously only had 3 phases. This 4th stage allowed for an additional week after the Crucible. This week allows new Marines to adjust from being a recruit to actually being a Marine. Both MCRD Parris Island and San Diego follow the outline of a 4 phase matrix, however, individual weeks and days vary. The following schedule breakdown is of recruit training at MCRD San Diego.

=== Phase 1 ===
==== Receiving week ====
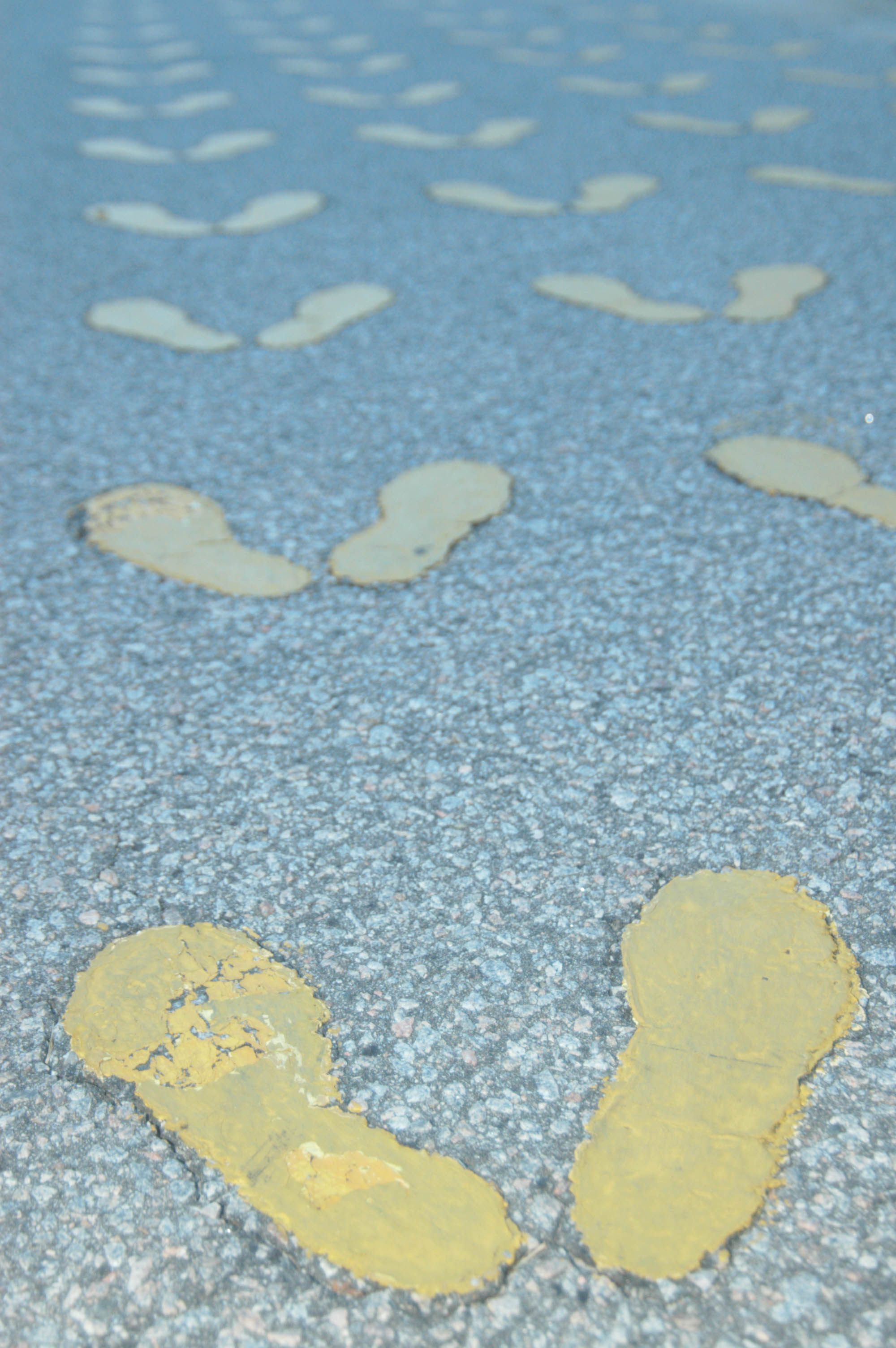
The first activity of a new recruit is to stand in his or her first formation, marked by these yellow footprints.

The initial period of Marine Corps Recruit Training is called the Receiving Phase, which begins as the new recruits are on the bus en route to their Recruit Depot. Recruits arrive at the depot late at night and are received by a drill instructor, who acquaints them with the Uniform Code of Military Justice, to which they are now subject. Disembarking from the bus, they line up on rows of yellow footprints painted on the concrete, their first formation, and learn how to stand at attention.

The recruits are given the opportunity to phone their next of kin and inform them of the recruit's safe arrival, are instructed as to items considered contraband and are given a "last chance" to dispose of such items without penalty. Contraband discovered in receiving will either be destroyed or mailed home at the expense of the next of kin. The Marine Corps has a strict zero tolerance policy on drug abuse (prescription or otherwise), and recruits that are found to have any in their possession will be prosecuted under the UCMJ and discharged immediately. They are issued utility and physical training uniforms and toiletries. From here, the males receive their first military haircut, which leaves them essentially bald. Females are instructed in the authorized hairstyling, which allows hair to be short enough to not touch the collar or in a bun.

The remainder of receiving involves completing paperwork, receiving vaccines and medical tests and storing civilian belongings under the eye of drill instructors set aside specifically for receiving. This takes approximately three days, usually without the opportunity to sleep, and ends with the Initial Strength Test (IST).

From this point, recruits experience "Black Friday", where they meet their permanent DIs. They also meet their company commander, usually a captain, who orders their DIs to train them to become Marines and has them recite the Drill Instructor's Creed. At this point, recruit training truly begins. Recruits are familiarized with incentive training as one of the consequences of disobedience or failure to perform to a DI's expectations. The DIs physically, psychologically and mentally harass the recruits, including yelling at maximum volume and intimidation, to elicit immediate compliance to instructions. The remainder of receiving is made as confusing and disorienting for the recruits as possible to help distance the recruits from civilian habits and to prepare them for Marine Corps discipline. The final "moment of truth" is offered to recruits who have been dishonest about their eligibility, such as drug use, judicial convictions or other disqualifying conditions.

==== Weeks 1–3 ====
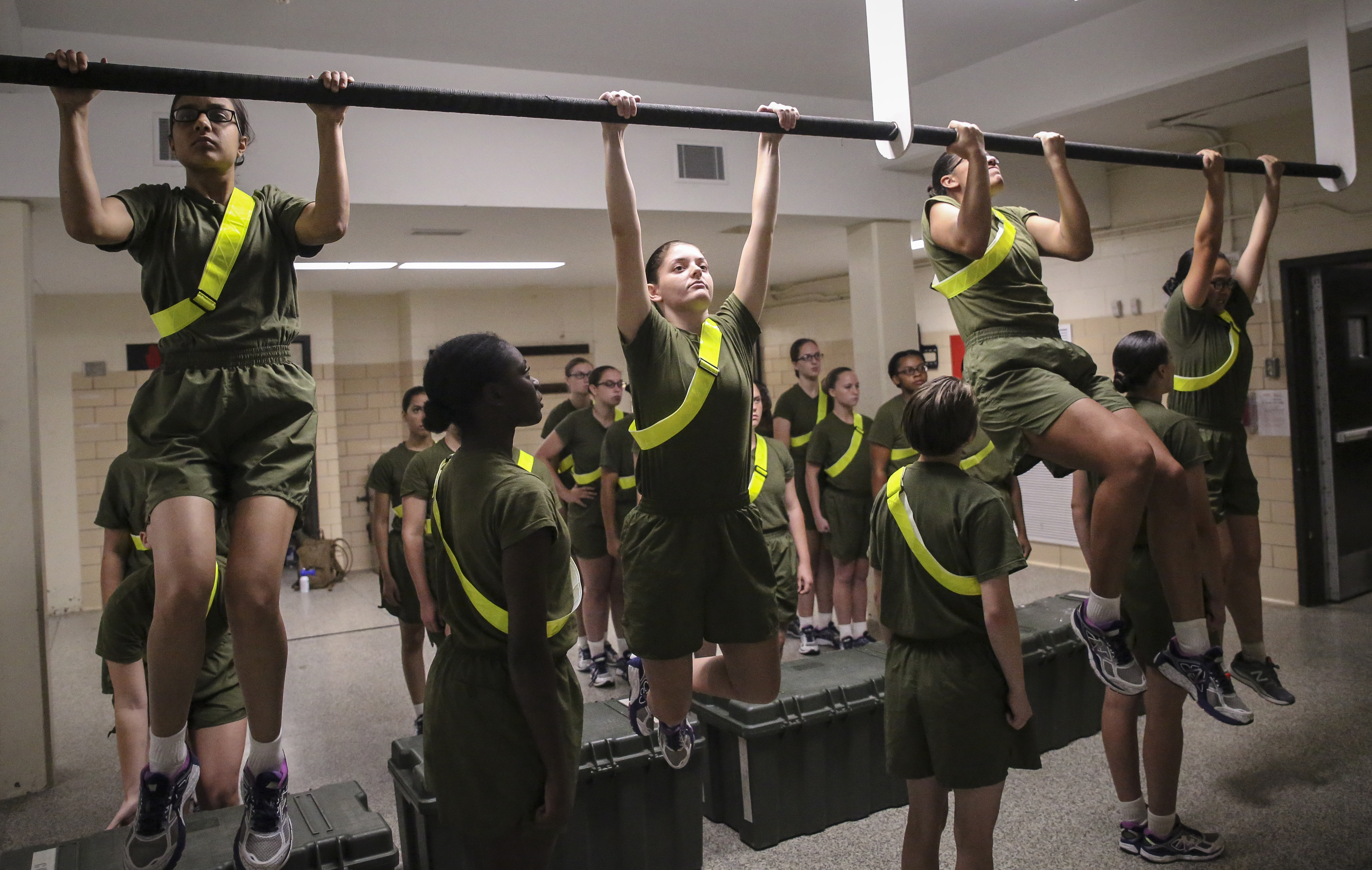
Recruits training in barracks

Phase one lasts approximately four weeks including receiving. Discipline will begin to be instilled in recruits by disorienting them and effectively cutting them off from civilian habits and mindsets, as well as reinforcing the mental and physical standards needed to perform under stressful situations that will be simulated in subsequent phases and experienced in combat situations. Recruits are required to learn and strictly use language and terminology typical to the Marine Corps, often derived from naval terminology.

The purpose of the first phase is to psychologically break down the recruit. At this point, civilian thoughts and habits are considered detrimental to training, so they are squashed during this period by intense physical training, unchanging routines, strict discipline and heavy instruction. The process is designed to enable recruits to learn to survive in combat situations and generally to adapt to, and overcome, any unexpected situation. One of the principal ideals learned during this period is that recruits are not to think of themselves as individuals—they are not permitted to use first person or second person pronouns. Instead, recruits are required to use third-person referrals, such as referring to themselves as "this recruit" and accomplish all tasks with teamwork. Any actions that put the benefit of an individual over the benefit of the other recruits are not permitted, and recruits are expected to conform to a standard that does not tolerate personal deviance or eccentricities. Speed, intensity and volume when speaking are valued as well.

The bulk of first-phase education consists of classes about the Marine Corps and its history and culture, first aid, rank structure and insignia, protocol, customs and courtesies, the 11 General Orders, aspects of the five paragraph order, prepare equipment for use (such as how to properly make a rack), regulations regarding uniforms, and other topics. Recruits learn through the use of rote memorization and mnemonics—recruits are expected to be able to recite a passage or quote in unison, without error and on demand.

Close order drill is an important factor in recruit training and begins from their first formation on the yellow footprints. In the first phase, they learn all of the basic commands and movements, memorizing the timing through the use of "ditties", or mnemonics, that help synchronize a recruit's movements with the rest of the platoon. Constant repetition and practice are used to facilitate muscle memory, so that any given movement can be rendered immediately and accurately upon order without hesitation. To aid in this development, drill movements are worked into other parts of daily life to help increase the platoon's synchronization and muscle memory—this same technique is used with other non-drill activities as well. For example, a recruit is instructed to hold his/her food tray in a similar fashion to holding the butt of a rifle during "shoulder arms".

During this phase, recruits are familiarized with their rifle. This weapon, never referred to as a "gun", stays with the recruit through the entirety of recruit training, being locked in an armory in the recruit's squad bay at night or when not in use. Platoons will stack their rifles and post a guard on them during situations where retaining them is impractical, such as during indoor classes or chow. Recruits must memorize the rifle's serial number, the four weapons safety rules, the four weapons conditions and go through preparatory lessons in marksmanship. In addition, recruits use the rifles in close order drill and will spend considerable time cleaning their weapons.

Recruits begin work toward earning their tan belt in the Marine Corps Martial Arts Program (MCMAP). Physical training gradually becomes more intense as recruits get stronger and their bodies are accustomed to the strain. Periodic fitness tests assess which recruits need more attention, and those who consistently fail to meet the minimum are in danger of being sent to the PCP. Recruits will conduct pugil stick bouts and are introduced to various courses, including, obstacle, combat and circuit. There is also training on combat care, to address how to care for individuals who become injured. The final week of first phase includes an inspection from the senior drill instructor and the initial drill competition against other platoons. By the end of the first phase, recruits can march, respond to orders, and keep up in physical fitness.

=== Phase Two ===
==== Week 4: Swim Week ====
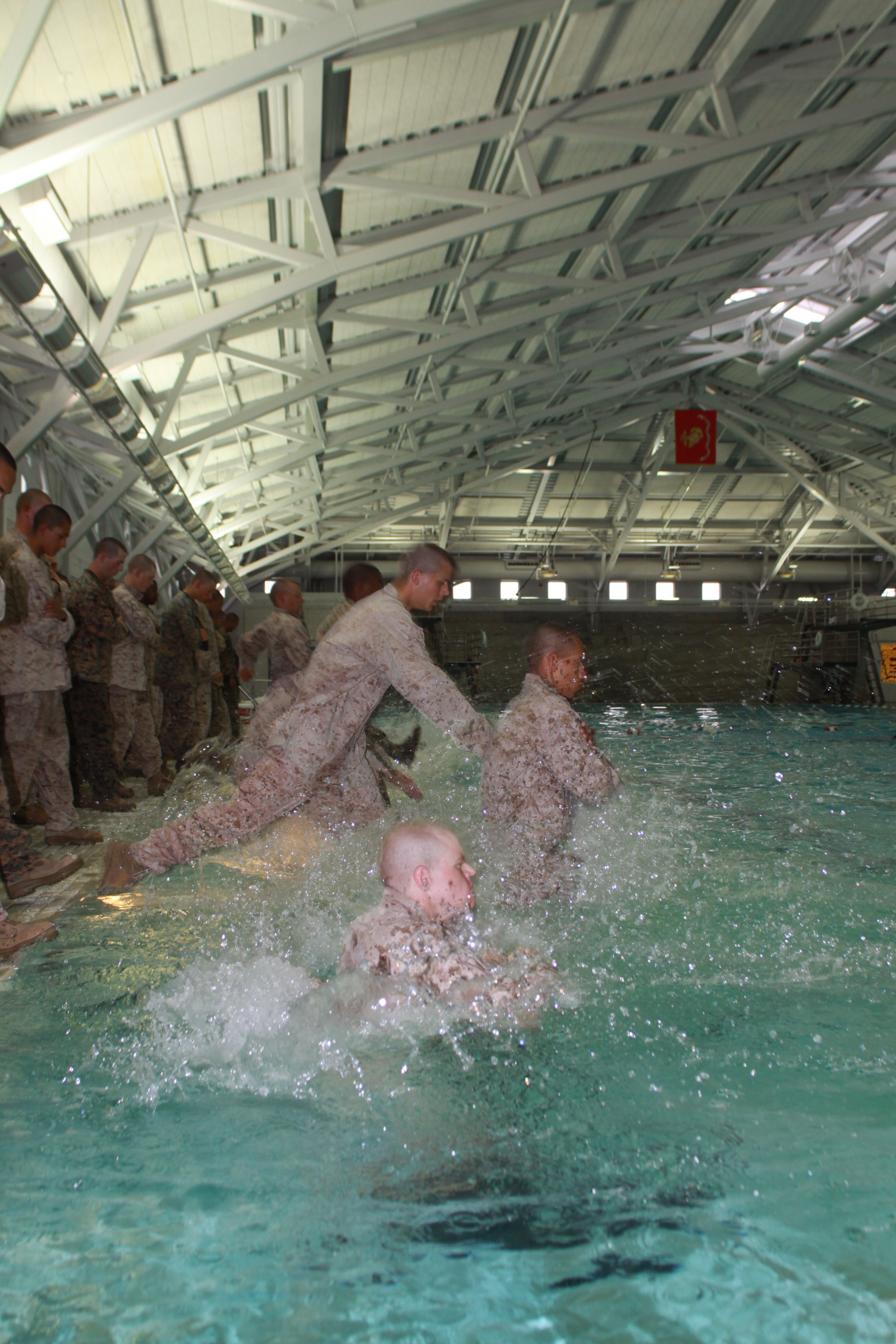
Recruits during Combat Water Survival

Swim week consists of four days of water survival qualifications exercises followed by MCMAP and pugil sticks, the first physical fitness test and an additional obstacle course. Recruits are taught swimming and water survival. This is the first event where failure to pass will result in a recruit being dropped to a different company to restart training and attempt to qualify again. If a recruit fails twice, he or she will be evaluated to see if a third chance is warranted, or if the recruit will be deemed unable to qualify and administratively separated from service. Certain MOSes require a more advanced swim qualification in boot camp; recruits who fail to achieve this qualification may be reclassified into a different MOS. Completion of Combat Water Survival training is necessary for graduation from recruit training.

The following exercises are completed in order to meet the Combat Water Survival qualifications:

- 25-meter swim
- 10-foot jump followed by 25-meter swim
  - Recruits must follow proper technique while jumping in order to perform the skill safely
- Tread water: 3 minutes
- Shed gear: remove rifle, helmet and vest within 10 seconds
- Swim with pack: 25 meters

==== Week 5: Team Week/Interior Guard ====
Recruits will continue building physically throughout this week, by performing log drills and strength and endurance courses. They are given the opportunity to have their first uniform fittings and receive haircuts. The week ends with their first Combat Fitness Test and a 5-kilometer hike. Team week gives recruits the opportunity to complete other jobs unsupervised by drill instructor and instead with other Marines. These tasks help to build a team atmosphere that will benefit later in recruit training as well as in each recruit's career. Team week is accompanied by lessons in interior guard. These classes teach recruits the importance of guard duties, such as fire watch. These lessons include fundamentals and tasks to be accomplished while on guard, along with consequences that can occur if duties are not completed accordingly.

==== Week 6 ====
The week begins with the second of three Physical Fitness Tests. Recruits will learn to master the use of a bayonet, as well as complete the final pugil stick training. An inspection will be completed by a commander, and recruits will be given their first written exam on material they learned thus far during recruit training. Recruits will learn to master the guide and brake in order to safely lower themselves down the 60-foot rappel tower. Recruits will be issued uniforms; this is the first time that the uniforms they wear will say U.S Marine Corps.

=== Phase 3 ===
==== Week 7: Grass Week ====
Because MCRD San Diego is located in the center of a dense urban area and adjacent to San Diego International Airport, it is impractical to conduct rifle qualification and field training there. Instead, recruits are sent to the Edson Range at Marine Corps Base Camp Pendleton. This week is partly spent in a class setting to learn about marksmanship principles of the M16 rifle and how to shoot efficiently. When not in class, recruits are "snapping in," or practicing their firing positions. Recruits are taught how to shoot by a marksmanship instructor and must learn four positions: sitting, prone, kneeling, and standing. They spend nearly the entire week mastering these firing positions, learning to use the rifle combat optic (RCO) and being able to adjust to additional challenges such as weather. At the end of the week, recruits will complete an 8-kilometer hike.

==== Week 8: Table I ====
Table I is to teach recruits to shoot from a distance. The distances are from 200, 300, and 500 yards. Half of the platoons will fire the standing, sitting, kneeling and prone positions—the other half will mark targets in the pits. After a break for lunch the roles are then reversed. Friday of that week is qualification day, where recruits must qualify with a minimum score in order to earn a marksmanship badge and continue training. Each shot will be given a score of 5, 4, 3, 2, or miss (0). After 50 shots, recruits will have the opportunity to receive a perfect score of 250 for Table I. The week ends with a 13-kilometer hike.

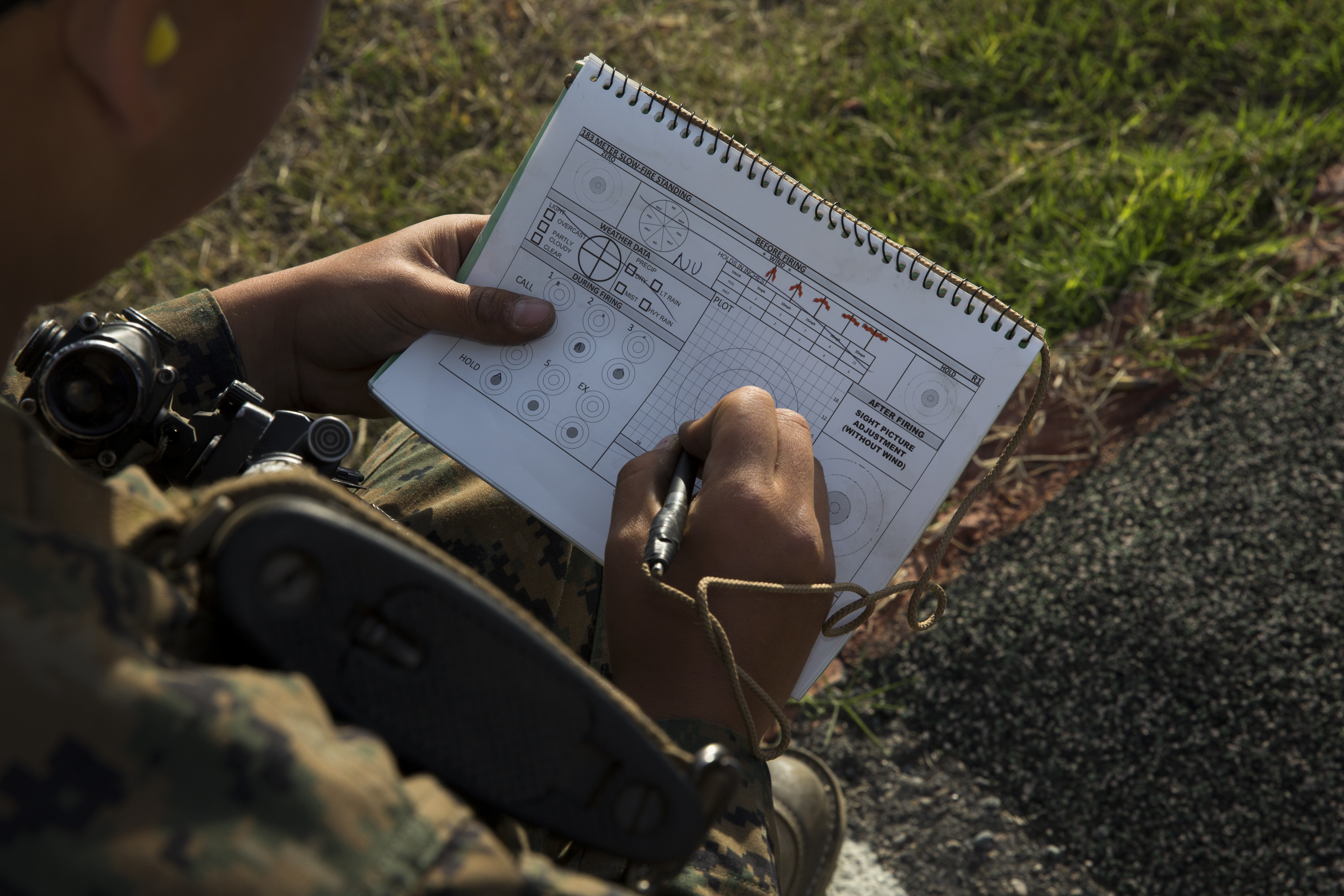
Recruit recording data at Edson Range

==== Week 9: Field Week/Table II ====
Week 9 begins with field week, where recruits will have to learn to navigate the land with only a map and compass. Table II is to follow field week; recruits will practice shooting at a much closer range of 25 yards and 100 yards. They will have 50 rounds and will be scored 2,1, or miss (0). They will be able to score a maximum of 100 points.

The recruits qualify for different levels of rifle qualifications, the score from Table I & Table II qualifications are added to meet the following levels:

Rifle Qualification Levels
Marksman	250-279
Sharpshooter	280-304
Expert	305-350

=== Phase 4 ===
==== Week 10: The Crucible ====
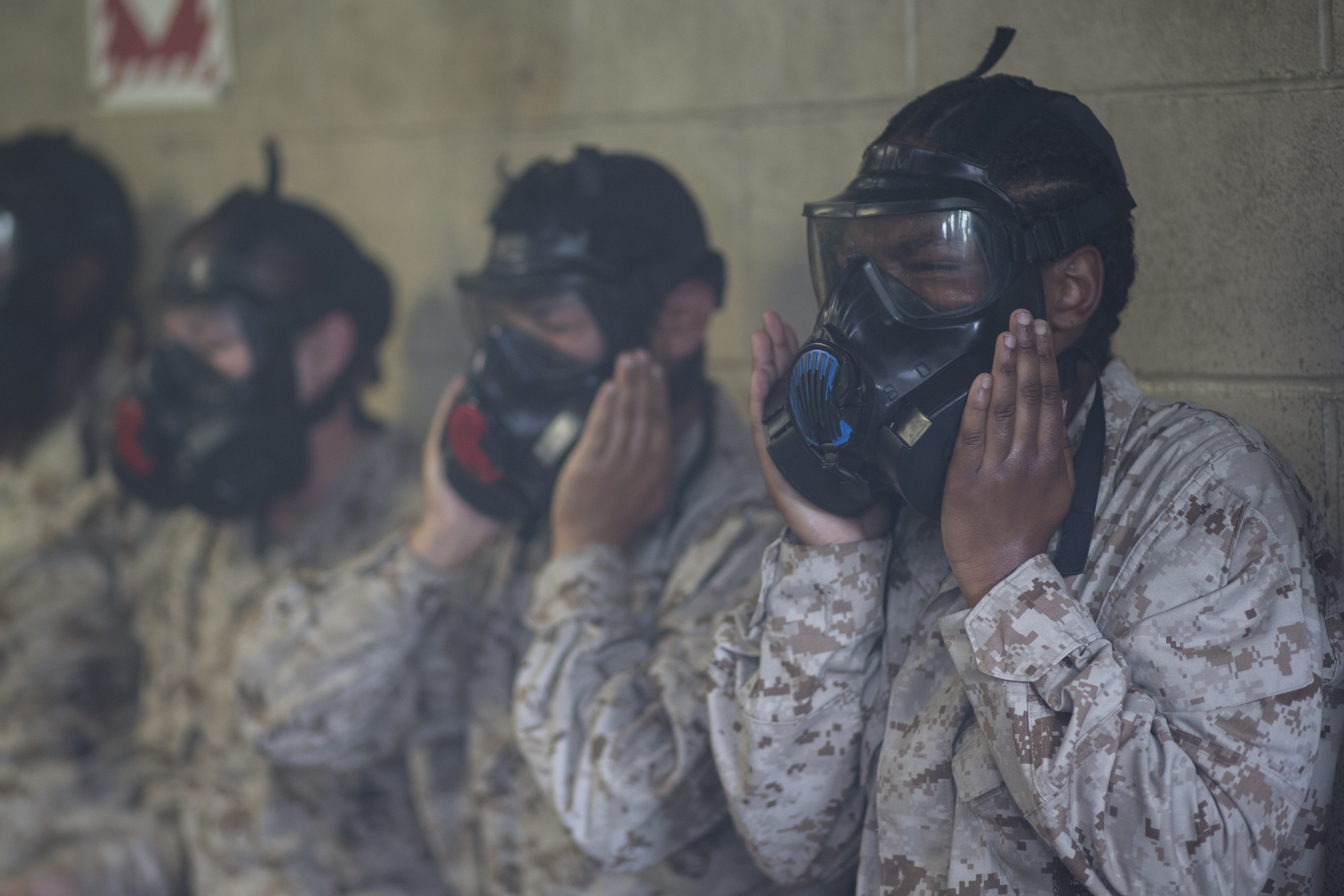
Recruits experiencing the Confidence Chamber

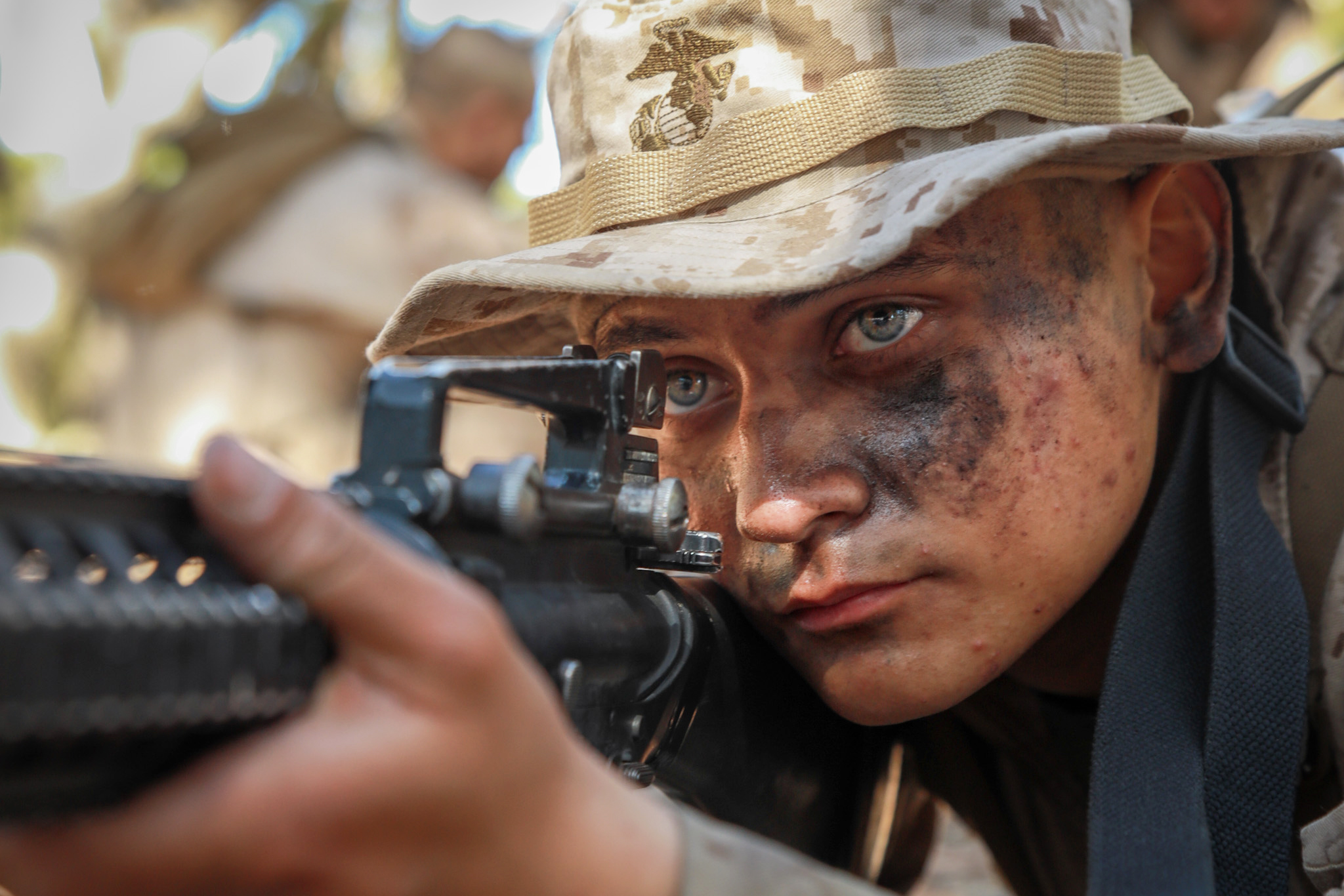
A Marine Corps recruit provides simulated security during the Crucible at Marine Corps Recruit Depot Parris Island, S.C. (2025).

At the beginning of week 10, recruits complete their second written exam, make travel arrangements to get home after graduation, and endure the Confidence Chamber. Recruits must enter an enclosed building filled with CS gas and perform various movements with their gas mask, including the removal of the gas mask. Recruits who attempt to flee the gas chamber are ordered back in—a failure to comply results in the recruit being dropped.

The Crucible is the final test in recruit training and represents the culmination of all of the skills and knowledge a Marine should possess. Designed in 1996 to emphasize the importance of teamwork in overcoming adversity, the Crucible is a rigorous 54-hour field training exercise demanding the application of everything a recruit has learned until that point in recruit training and includes a total of 48 miles of marching. It simulates typical combat situations with strenuous testing, hardship and the deprivation of food and sleep. Recruits are given two MREs (a self-contained, individual field ration). The recruits are only allowed six hours of sleep through the entire 54-hour event. Recruits are broken into squad-sized teams (possibly smaller) and placed under the charge of one drill instructor.

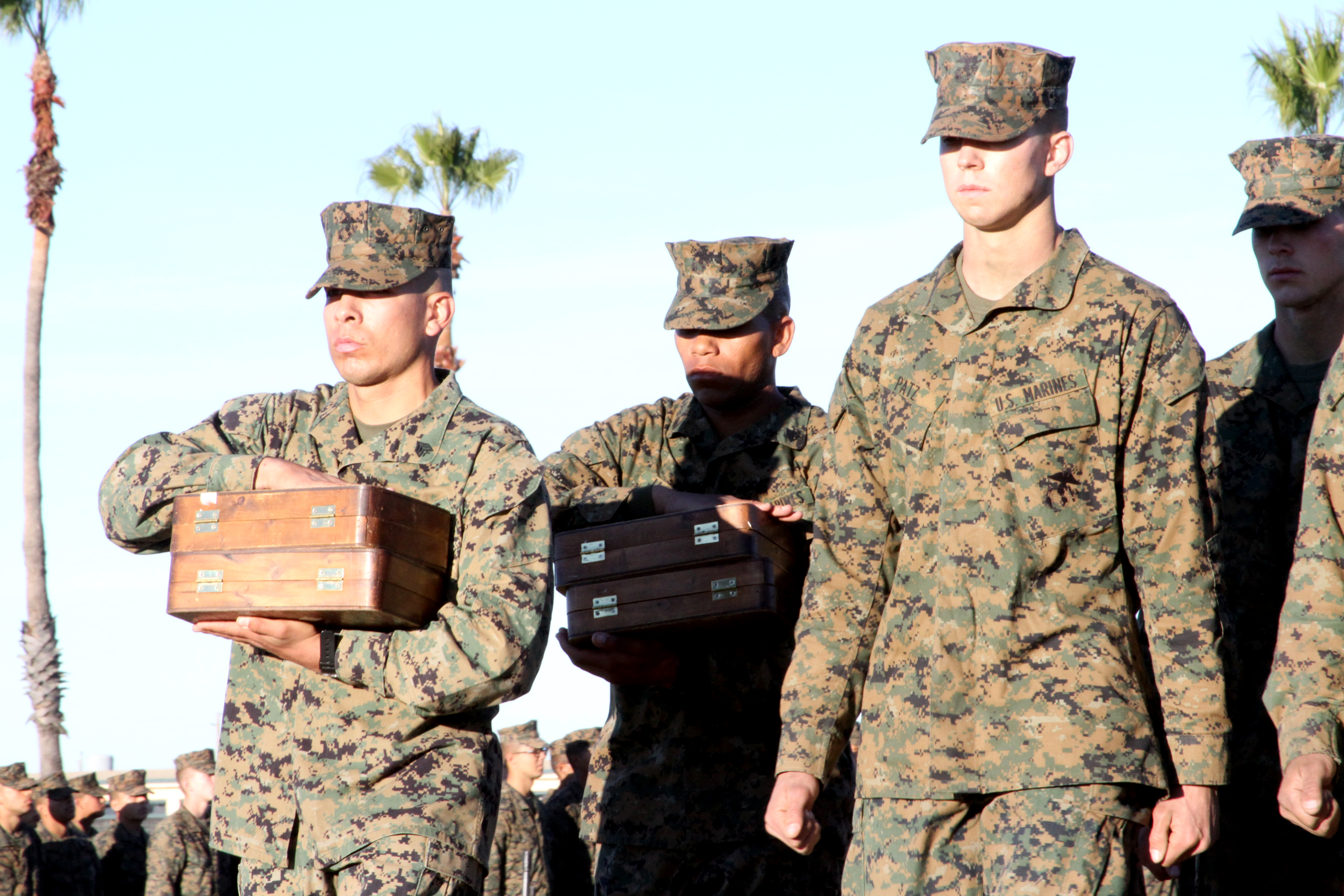
Drill instructors prior to handing out the Eagle, Globe, and Anchor after completing the crucible

Throughout the Crucible, recruits are faced with physical and mental challenges that must be accomplished before advancing further. Teamwork is stressed, as the majority of tasks are impossible without it—each group must succeed or fail as a whole. The others will fail unless every recruit passes through together, requiring the team to aid their fellow recruits who struggle in the accomplishment of the given mission. Also stressed are the Corps' core values of "Honor, Courage, and Commitment"—events sometimes present a moral challenge. Many challenge events are named after Marine Medal of Honor recipients or otherwise notable Marines, and drill instructors will often take the time to read the citation of the award and hold a guided discussion with the recruits to evaluate their moral development. Drill instructors are also vigilant for those recruits who succeed and fail in leadership positions.

Some of the challenges encountered during the Crucible are team and individual obstacle courses, day and night assault courses, land navigation courses, individual rushes up steep hills, large-scale martial arts challenges, and countless patrols to and from each of these. These challenges are often made even more difficult by the additions of limitations or handicaps, such as the requirement to carry several ammunition drums, not touching portions of an obstacle painted red to indicate simulated booby traps, and evacuating team members with simulated wounds.

On the final day of the Crucible, recruits are awoken and begin their final march. The final destination and what the recruits read and are addressed on there varies by location:

- For those in San Diego, the summit of "The Reaper", a 700-foot mountain where Merritt A. Edson's Medal of Honor citation from the Battle of Edson's Ridge from the Guadalcanal campaign rests.
- For those on Parris Island, the steel scale replica of the Marine Corps War Memorial on the Peatross Parade Deck reproducing Raising the Flag on Iwo Jima, Joe Rosenthal's photograph of the flag raising atop Mount Suribachi during the battle for the island.

After the address, the drill instructors will award the recruits the Eagle, Globe, and Anchor (EGA) emblem, signifying them as full-fledged Marines. Immediately after this, Marines hike back down The Reaper and are then offered the "Warrior's Breakfast", where they are permitted to eat as much as they like, even of previously forbidden foods, such as ice cream. During this meal, the new Marines have the opportunity to eat and talk with their drill instructors informally for the first time.

==== Week 11: Marine Week ====
The new Marines will be given additional time with the drill instructor but are provided with the opportunity to now ask the questions they could not before. These new Marines will be responsible for themselves and be able to use what they have learned over the past 10 weeks. During this week, Marines are instructed in some of the recruit behaviors that are no longer appropriate as Marines, such as referring to oneself in the third person. They will have their final uniform fitting, along with a blood drive, and a visit to the Marine Corps Museum on base at MCRD San Diego. Lastly, they will have an inspection by the company commander.

==== Week 12: Family Day/Graduation ====
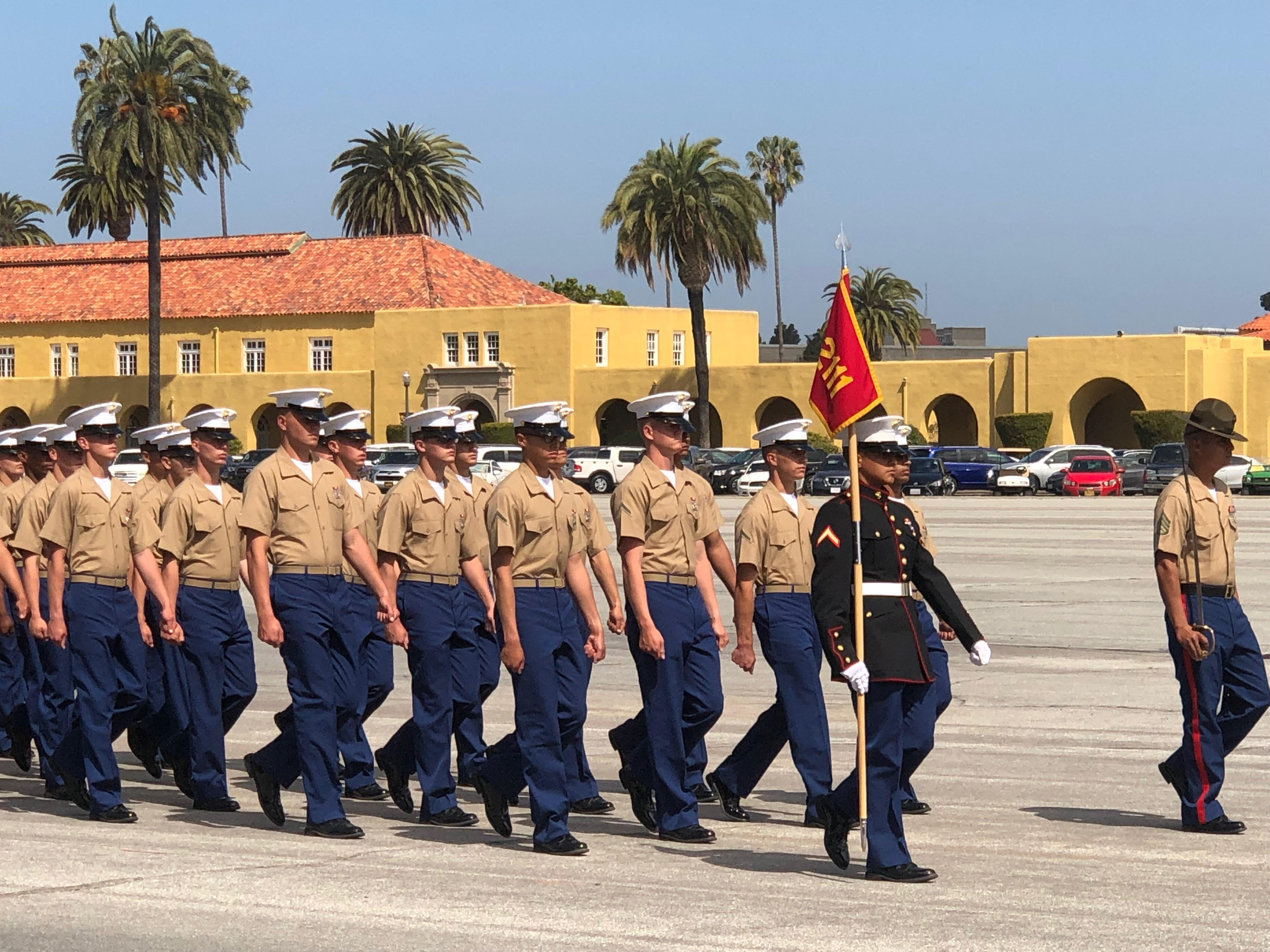
Marines marching during MCRD San Diego graduation ceremony

Week 12 begins with graduation practice, liberty, and a final commander inspection. The last full day before graduation is called Family Day. The public day begins early with a "Motivational Run", when the new Marines run (by company, then by platoon) yelling Marine Corps cadences past their families, circling the base and ending at the parade deck. After a brief ceremony explaining to the families what type of training they have gone through, the newest Marines are dismissed to on-base liberty with their families from late morning until early evening. During this time, they are free to roam about the base and show their families around, although they are not permitted in certain areas, nor are they permitted to leave the base. During the last night, some platoons allow the new Marines to host a show, where they perform skits regarding humorous moments during training, especially of their drill instructors.

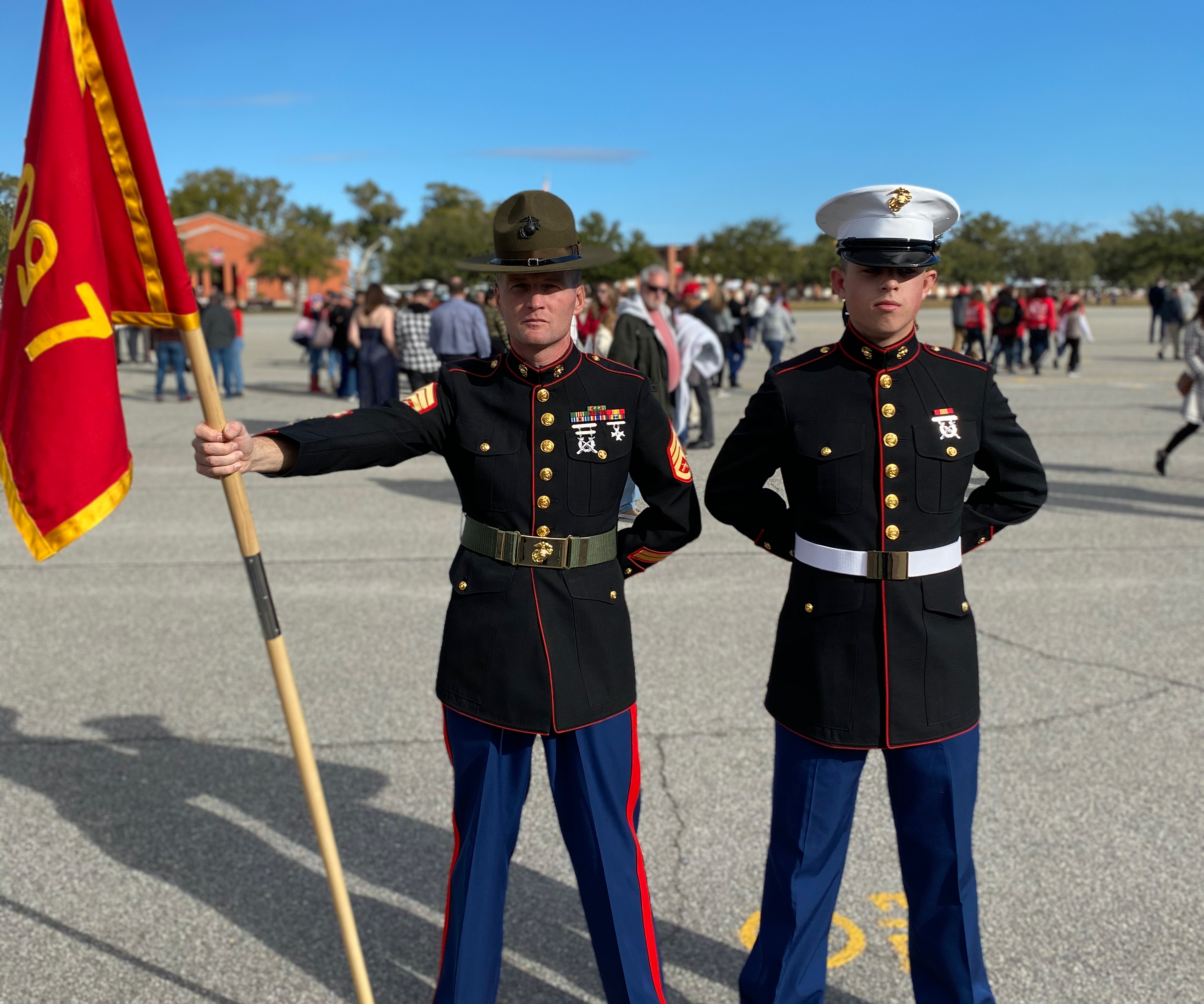
A new U.S. Marine stands with his drill instructor on graduation day.

The next morning, the new Marines form for their graduation ceremony, march across the parade deck, have their guidons retired, and are dismissed from recruit training by their senior drill instructors.

== Continuing education ==
After this rigorous recruit training, these new Marines will receive ten days of leave and possibly more if they are assisting their local Marine recruiter with recruiting. The leave is a time to rest and reflect on what they have accomplished, as well as incorporate their newly found discipline into their civilian life. They are expected to conduct themselves during leave as a disciplined Marine would and maintain their physical and mental fitness. After the leave has expired, Marines will attend the School of Infantry (SOI); East Coast graduates will attend SOI East at Camp Geiger, while West Coast graduates return to Camp Pendleton for SOI West. Non-infantry Marines will attend a course called Marine Combat Training for 29 days, then proceed to the appropriate school for their Military Occupational Specialty (which vary in length). Infantry Marines attend the Infantry Training Battalion for 59 days. Then these newly trained Marines are assigned to their first unit in the operating forces.

== Educator Workshops ==
The Marine Corps hosts Educator Workshops for high school teachers and influencers such as principals and counselors at both MCRD Parris Island and MCRD San Diego so that they are better able to advise students considering the Marine Corps about what Recruit Training includes and what opportunities the Marines offer. Each is a week-long interactive event that covers such Recruit Training events as receiving, a Black Friday drill instructor speech, PT and IT, obstacle courses and rifle range practice along with Q & A sessions with Marines and recruits.

Workshops may require no prior military service and no spousal military service within the last 10 years, but retired Marines have participated in the workshops as educators. Members of the media are also allowed into the workshops.

College educators, athletic coaches and music educators and directors have separate workshops at Recruit Command at Marine Corps Base Quantico.

== Incidents ==
There have been a number of recorded incidents of death and/or abuse during Marine Corps basic training.

=== Ribbon Creek ===
On the night of 8 April 1956, Staff Sergeant Matthew McKeon, a junior drill instructor at the Marine Corps Recruit Depot Parris Island, marched his assigned platoon into Ribbon Creek, a swampy tidal creek. The incident resulted in the deaths of six Marine recruits. In the end, McKeon was found guilty of negligent homicide and drinking on duty. The sentence was nine months of confinement at hard labor, rank reduced to private, a $270 fine and a bad conduct discharge. After a review of the evidence and numerous high-profile Marines providing strong and positive testimony to McKeon's character, the Secretary of the Navy later reduced the sentence to three months in the brig, reduction to private with no discharge and no fine. McKeon went back on active duty. He was never able to regain his former rank and was medically retired from the Marine Corps in 1959 as a corporal because of a back injury.

=== Wounding of Henry W. Hiscock ===
On 3 January 1976, Private Henry W. Hiscock was shot through the hand by a round from an M16 rifle fired by drill instructor Sergeant Robert F. Henson from fifty yards away. Henson, attempting to frighten Hiscock, had loaded a blank round into his rifle, stating that he was going to kill Hiscock and then firing the weapon at Hiscock as he ran away. Once firing the blank shot, Henson chambered another round believing it also to be blank, but in fact the round was live and struck Hiscock. Later reports indicated that prior to firing the second round, Hiscock had been told by other drill instructors that Henson was seriously intending to kill him and that he had best "say goodbye" to his platoon.

After the incident, Henson and other drill instructors attempted to cover up what had happened, submitting false reports that Hiscock had cut his hand in the rifle range latrine and also had coerced other recruits who had been on the range that day to stay silent out of fear of reprisal. Henson faced a court martial, at which he pled guilty to eight charges, including the shooting and hazing of Hiscock, and for attempted cover-up of the incident. He was given a one-year sentence (of which he would only serve two months), a reduction in rank, and a bad conduct discharge. The cover-up led to several criminal convictions.

=== Death of Lynn E. McClure ===
Private Lynn E. McClure died on 13 March 1976 after being beaten during a mock bayonet drill at Marine Corps Recruit Depot San Diego, on December 5, 1975, leading to accusations of boot camp brutality. McClure never regained consciousness after the beating. He died in the Veteran's Administration hospital in Houston, Texas. An autopsy revealed he had "suffered massive skull and brain damage".

Three drill instructors and a captain faced court martial for his beating and death, with charges including negligent homicide and involuntary manslaughter. In addition, a colonel in command of the training regiment and another captain, for "dereliction in the performance of duties", received non-judicial punishment.

On 29 June 1976, the first drill instructor, Sgt. Bronson, was found not guilty on all seven charges, including involuntary manslaughter. On 19 July 1976, a second drill instructor, Sgt. Wallraff, who was the supervisor of the acquitted drill instructor, was found guilty of "dereliction of duty" as he 'negligently failed to insure' that Bronson 'was experienced in the supervision of pugil stick training and knowledgeable' in the proper procedures."

In September 1976, the Marine Corps concluded all legal proceedings against those involved. Formal reprimands, without discipline, were given to a colonel, two captains, and a drill instructor. All the original charges were dismissed or received acquittals.

Following the McClure's death, the Marine Corps, under the leadership of the commandant, General Louis H. Wilson, initiated changes in recruit training, including improved screening of both drill instructors and recruits.

=== 2006–2007 recruit abuse at MCRD San Diego ===
In 2007, recruit abuse at MCRD San Diego received widespread attention due to the number of recruits involved.

In August 2007, Sergeant Jerrod M. Glass was charged with 225 counts of abusing recruits between 23 December 2006 and 10 February 2007. None of the alleged abuse resulted in serious injury. Sgt. Brian M. Wendel was charged with two counts of assault, three of maltreatment, one of damaging personal property, as well as concealing serious offenses, dereliction of duty, and making false official statements. Sgt. Robert C. Hankins also faced a court-martial in the case.

Prosecutors had recommended Glass spend two years in the brig and receive a bad-conduct discharge. Captain Christian Pappas, the lead prosecutor in the case, argued that Glass slapped, beat and ridiculed nearly all 40 recruits in his platoon for two months, showing a "complete disregard and contempt" for rules that ban such maltreatment. Pappas told the jury that Glass had struck recruits with flashlights and tent poles, choked a recruit, and made recruits drink water until they vomited.

On 15 November 2007, Glass was found guilty on charges of eight counts, including "cruelty and maltreatment, destruction of personal property, assault and violating orders on how to properly treat recruits". He was sentenced to six months in the brig and was given a bad-conduct discharge for abusing 23 recruits. He also received a reduction in rank to private and pay forfeiture. He had faced a maximum sentence of 10 years of confinement, dishonorable discharge, reduction in rank, and forfeiture of pay and benefits.

After his conviction, Glass gave an interview in which he asserted that the behaviors he was convicted of were taught to him by senior drill instructors, and were condoned by them and those higher up in the command chain; that these were long-standing training practices.

In December 2007, Wendel was found not guilty of the charges of abuse, maltreatment, and making a false statement. He was convicted of disobeying an order and dereliction of duty.

=== Recruit suicide and conviction of Joseph Felix ===
Following the suicide of a Muslim recruit at MCRD Parris Island in March 2016, the Marine Corps launched an investigation. They found "unchecked" abuse by junior drill instructors. As a result, six drill instructors, including Gunnery Sergeant Joseph Felix, were charged; and, the commanding officer of the recruit battalion was fired.

In November 2017, Felix was convicted of multiple counts of abusing recruits, as well as violation of a lawful general order, dereliction of duty, making a false official statement, and drunk and disorderly conduct. He was sentenced to 10 years confinement, with reduction to grade E-1, total forfeitures and a dishonorable discharge. His abuse was mostly directed at Muslim recruits, and is believed to have led to the suicide of Pakistani-American recruit Raheel Siddiqui. Felix's appeal was denied in 2019.

=== Suicides of drill instructors ===
In 2025, The Washington Post and Military.com reported that there were higher rates of suicide among drill instructors, compared to other Marines. Part of the reason, according to a 2019 study conducted by the Marine Corps, was that the Corps lacks adequate services for those struggling with their mental health, and a culture that stigmatizes those who seek help.
