= 3/2 =

3/2 may refer to:

== Numbers and dates ==
- The fraction three-over-two (3/2), equal to one and one-half (1 1/2), or in decimal form 1.5
- March 2 (month-day notation)
- 3 February (day-month notation)

== Photography ==
- A common aspect ratio (image)

== Music ==
- A triple metre time signature
- Perfect fifth, an interval whose frequency ratio is 3 to 2
- Triplet (music)
- Hemiola

== Military ==
- 3rd Battalion, 2nd Marines
