= Rother =

Rother may refer to:

== General ==
- Rother (surname) (also sometimes spelled Röther)
- Rother District, a local government district in East Sussex, England
- Rother FM, former independent local radio station for Rotherham, South Yorkshire, England
- Rother Kuppe, a mountain in Bavaria, Germany
- Rother Ochsen, a tavern in Stein am Rhein, Switzerland
- HMS Rother, two Royal Navy warships
- SS Rother (1914), a British ship

== Rivers in England ==
- River Rother, East Sussex, in East Sussex and Kent
- River Rother, West Sussex, in Hampshire and West Sussex
- River Rother, South Yorkshire, in Derbyshire and Yorkshire

== See also ==
- Rother Valley (disambiguation)
