= Rothert =

Rothert is a surname. Notable people with the surname include:

- Harlow Rothert (1908–1997), American shot putter
- Henry Rothert (1840–1920), American politician and school administrator
- Stanisław Jerzy Rothert (1900–1962), Polish journalist and sprinter

== See also ==
- Rother (surname)
