= Series commander =

Position in the United States Marine Corps

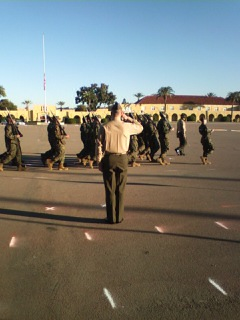
The Series Commander reviews his troops as they pass for Initial Drill.

The Series Commander is a United States Marine Corps officer assigned to a recruit training company who is responsible for the conduct and instruction of Marine recruits and Marine Corps Drill Instructors within one of the two series, lead or follow. Series Commanders are typically of the rank of first lieutenant (O-2) or captain (O-3), and they are assisted in their duties by a Series Chief Drill Instructor (MCRD San Diego) or a Series Gunnery Sergeant (MCRD Parris Island).

The Series Commander is primarily charged with supervision and safety during recruit training. Before a recruit is allowed to run the Obstacle Course or the Confidence Course, the Series Commander must run the course first and check each obstacle for any unsafe conditions. The Series Commander will then oversee his Drill Instructors as they lead the recruits through the course. The Series Commander also serves as a verifying officer and safety officer during the Rifle Range, A-Line, Basic Warrior Training, and The Crucible.

Though Series Commanders do not train recruits in the same way as Drill Instructors do, they do conduct PT, lead conditioning hikes, conduct hygiene and uniform inspections, make on the spot corrections, and teach classes covering Marine Corps policies on Hazing, Fraternization, and Equal Opportunity. Additionally, the Combat Training Pool, Martial Arts Instructors, Academic Instruction Company, and Crucible Training Company are all commanded by former Series Commanders. A Recruit Training Battalion Operations Officer will most likely be a former Series and Company Commander from that Battalion.

The role was also created to provide another layer of authority to monitor more closely the individual drill instructors, as a result of the Ribbon Creek incident. Throughout the training cycle, every recruit is interviewed personally by the Series Commander to ensure their drill instructors have acted in accordance with the proper orders and policies. The purpose of these interviews is twofold; first, it allows individual recruits access to a commissioned officer, and second, it allows the Series Commander the opportunity to speak with each recruit in his series individually throughout the course of boot camp. Underlying the policy in the Standard Operating Procedures for Recruit Training against recruit abuse, recruit interviews are also used to ensure recruits are not physically or verbally abused by their drill instructors or any other personnel in the training command.

== Responsibilities ==
- Ensure the welfare and safety of each recruit in his care.
- Provide positive leadership to the Marines assigned to him for duty.
- Support by example and authority the letter and spirit of the Standard Operating Procedures for Recruit Training.
- Ensure the Drill Instructors train recruits in accordance with the Recruit Training SOP.
- Evaluate the effectiveness of the recruit training process and recommend improvements or corrections as necessary.
- Maintain the objectivity and integrity of the recruit training process.
- Lead by example ensuring strict compliance with core values, Commandant of the Marine Corps' vision for recruit training and the Commander's Intent.
- Foster spirit and discipline within the series through positive leadership; ensure that drill instructors are routinely given objective and accurate written performance assessments.
- Ensure the safety, health, and welfare of recruits and drill instructors.
- Maintain accountability of personnel and equipment within the series.
- Responsible for screening all pick-up and drop evaluation folders and recruits.

== See also ==
- Marine Corps Recruit Depot Parris Island: Drill Instructors (Drill Instructor Pledge)
