= Emile Zola Berman =

American lawyer

Emile Zola Berman (November 3, 1902 – July 3, 1981) was an American criminal defense lawyer famed for his defense of persons accused in controversial cases, including the assassin of Robert F. Kennedy, Sirhan Sirhan, and a U.S. Marine Corps drill instructor involved in the death of six recruits.

== Early life ==
Berman was named after the French novelist Émile Zola (1840–1902). During World War II he was an intelligence officer in the 10th Air Force in Burma where he received the Distinguished Flying Cross and the Bronze Star. He was discharged as a lieutenant colonel.

== Career ==
Berman first became nationally known in 1956 when he defended U.S. Marine Corps Staff Sergeant Matthew McKeon who was accused of manslaughter after leading men into a creek during a training exercise on Parris Island. Six of the men drowned, but Berman was able to get an acquittal on the most serious charges. In 1969, Berman was part of the defense team of Sirhan Sirhan, the assassin of Robert F. Kennedy. Berman received criticism for defending an avowed anti-Zionist but countered his critics by stating that he was defending Sirhan's rights and not his beliefs.
