= Rother Valley =

The Rother Valley is the valley of the River Rother, of which there are at least three in England. Rother Valley may refer to:

- Rother Valley (UK Parliament constituency), a parliamentary constituency in Yorkshire, named for the Yorkshire and Derbyshire River Rother
- Rother Valley Country Park, a public park in the valley of the Yorkshire and Derbyshire River Rother
- Rother Valley Railway, a railway taking its name from the Sussex and Kent River Rother

See also:

- Rotherham College of Arts and Technology, in Yorkshire, into which the former Rother Valley College merged in 2004
