= Death of Jason Rother =

American Marine

Jason Rother
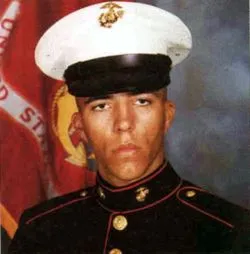
- Born: July 16, 1969; Minneapolis, Minnesota, U.S.
- Died: August 31, 1988 (aged 19); Mojave Desert, California, U.S.
- Burial place: Fort Snelling National Cemetery
- Military career
- Allegiance: United States
- Branch: United States Marine Corps
- Service years: 1987–1988
- Rank: Lance corporal
- Units: 3rd Battalion, 2nd Marines, 2nd Marine Division

Jason Rother (July 16, 1969 – August 31, 1988) was a 19-year-old United States Marine who was abandoned in the Mojave Desert during a training exercise, causing his death from dehydration and exposure. His death is now commonly used as a lesson taught to members of the military about the importance of accountability and responsibility.

== Death ==
Rother was a lance corporal assigned to Kilo Company, Third Battalion, Second Marine Regiment, Second Marine Division (K Co., 3/2, 2 MARDIV) based at Camp Lejeune, North Carolina. In August 1988, the unit was sent to the massive Marine Corps Air Ground Combat Center Twentynine Palms (MCAGCC) for desert warfare training in the Mojave desert. 1stLt Allen Lawson was assigned the task of posting road guides on the night of August 30, 1988, along the route position of a battalion night movement exercise. No concrete plan was made for the Marines to be returned to their units. Lawson disobeyed the order to place road guides in pairs, got lost, forgot where he had placed Rother, and along with Sergeants Thomas Turnell and Christopher Clyde who were responsible for Rother, failed to report he was missing upon completion of the exercise. Over 40 hours had passed without anyone in the battalion knowing or saying that Rother was missing. Only once acting squad leader Corporal Harbison realized late in the afternoon on September 1 that he had not seen Rother all day did an investigation commence into his unaccounted-for status.

Several searches were launched with helicopters, thermal imaging gear, and over 1,000 Marines on foot. Rother was not carrying a map or compass, had very little water, and weighed only 135 pounds (61 kg). The first search discovered he had left behind some of his gear and made an arrow out of stones where he had originally been dropped off. That search, and several others, failed to locate him. Rother's remains would not be found until December 4, over three months after his disappearance. All that was left were skeletal remains. It was believed that Rother likely died less than 24 hours before the first search was launched and that the temperature on the day had reached 107 °F (42 °C). Tracing the distance, it was found that Rother had hiked over 17 miles (27 km) and was only two miles (3.2 km) from the base.

== Legacy ==
The Marine Corps commandant General Alfred M. Gray Jr. ordered an outside investigation which resulted in the court-martial of 1st Lieutenant Lawson, finding him guilty of dereliction of duty and sentencing him to discharge and four months in military prison.

== See also ==
- Ribbon Creek incident
- Lee Mirecki incident
- Kurkse tragedy
