= 3rd Battalion, 2nd Marines =

US Marine Corps unit

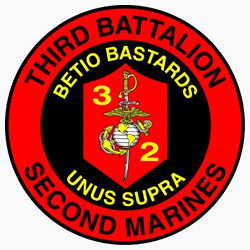
- 3/2 Insignia
- Active: 18 January 1941 – 27 March 1946; 28 December 1950 – present
- Country: United States of America
- Branch: United States Marine Corps
- Type: Light infantry
- Role: Locate, close with and destroy the enemy by fire and maneuver
- Part of: 2nd Marine Regiment; 2nd Marine Division
- Garrison/HQ: Marine Corps Base Camp Lejeune
- Nickname: "Betio Bastards"
- Mottos: "Unus Supra" (Latin) "One above" "We quell the storm, and ride the thunder!" Most Recently: "Strength and Honor"
- Colors: Red, Black, & Gold
- Engagements: World War II: Battle of Guadalcanal; Battle of Tarawa; Battle of Saipan; Battle of Tinian; Battle of Okinawa; Operation Desert Storm; Somalia Civil War: Operation Restore Hope; Yugoslav Wars: Operation Joint Guard; Operation Deliberate Guard; War on terror: Operation Iraqi Freedom; Operation Enduring Freedom

Commanders
- Current commander: LtCol Shawn. P. Connors

3rd Battalion, 2nd Marines (3/2) is an infantry battalion in the United States Marine Corps based in Marine Corps Base Camp Lejeune, North Carolina. Comprising approximately 1000 marines and sailors and nicknamed the "Betio Bastards", they fall under the command of the 2nd Marine Regiment of the 2nd Marine Division.

== Subordinate units ==
- H&S Company
- Kilo Company
- Lima Company
- Weapons Company

== History ==
=== World War II ===
The unit was activated 18 January 1941 at San Diego, California. They were assigned to the 2nd Marine Brigade during February 1941 and deployed to Koro Island with the 2nd Marine Division in June 1942. The battalion participated in the following World War II campaigns:

- Guadalcanal
- Tarawa
- Saipan
- Tinian
- Okinawa

During the Battle of Tarawa, the battalion participated in the amphibious assault on, and the capture of, the small island of Betio in the Tarawa atoll, earning them the nickname "the Betio Bastards."

Following the war, the battalion stood occupation duty in Kagoshima, Japan until February 1946 when they redeployed to Camp Pendleton, California. The battalion was deactivated on 27 March 1946.

=== Post World War II history ===
3/2 was reactivated on 28 December 1950 at Camp Pendleton and were again assigned to the 2nd Marine Division. They deployed to Guantanamo Bay, Cuba during the Cuban Missile Crisis in 1962. They were deployed on a cruise to the Mediterranean Sea from September 1965 to April 1966. The battalion again deployed to Guantanamo Bay, Cuba from September 1967 through January 1968, to augment the Marine Barracks there in manning outposts along the base's 17-mile-long (27 km) fence line. The battalion deployed to Saudi Arabia in August 1990 and participated in Operation Desert Storm in early 1991. In 1994 they participated in Operation Restore Hope in Somalia and Operation Deny Flight and Operation Provide Promise.

=== Lance Corporal Rother incident ===
Lance Corporal Jason Rother was a Marine from 3/2 who became lost in the Mojave Desert and died of exposure. His skeletal remains were found over four months after he went missing.

=== Global war on terror ===
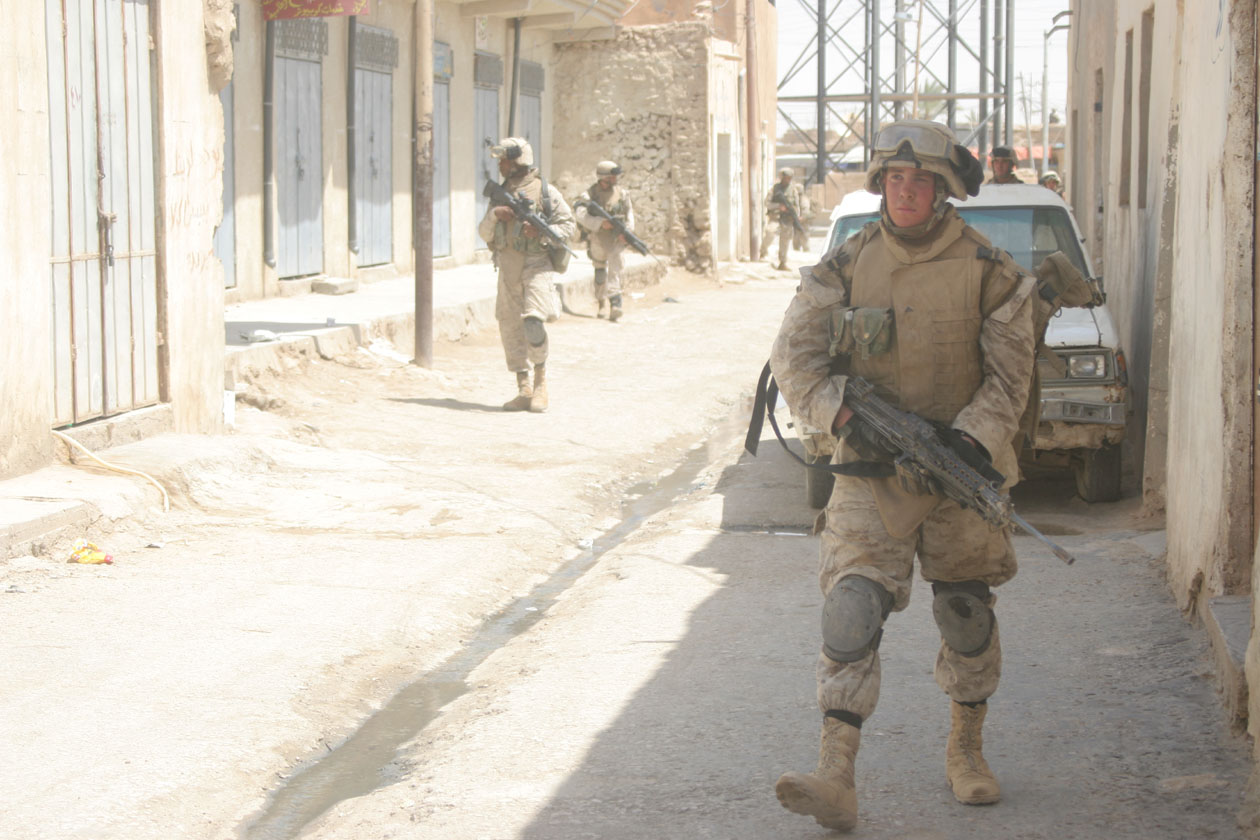
Marines from the 3rd Battalion, 2nd Marines patrolling through an Iraqi city in August 2005

In 2003, 3/2 deployed to Kuwait as part of Task Force Tarawa and, beginning in March, supported Operation Iraqi Freedom. The battalion also participated in the battle of Nasiriyah. During this deployment, 3/2 had 1 Marine, Sgt. Nicholas M. Hodson of Springfield, MO killed in action. While en route back to the United States on 12 June 2003, 3rd Battalion 2nd Marines (3/2) while aboard USS Kearsarge (LHD-3) was deployed in support of Operation Shining Express to support the rescue of U.S. embassy personnel and American citizens during the Second Liberian Civil War.

During 2004, 3/2 was designated as the AT (anti-terrorism) battalion and was assigned to different areas around the globe. The battalion was spread between Afghanistan, Djibouti, and Cuba.

The battalion again deployed to Iraq in February 2005. The battalion launched major combat operations Operation Matador, Operation Spear, and Operation Quick Strike. They conducted security and stabilization operations in Al Anbar Province until September 2005. During this deployment 3/2 had 3 Marines killed in action.

The battalion again deployed to Iraq in the July 2006. They conducted security and stabilization operations in the Al Anbar Province in the city of Habbaniyah until mid February 2007. During this deployment the battalion had 14 Marines killed in action.

The battalion again deployed to Iraq in October 2007 operating in the Al Qaim region of the Al Anbar Province with Iraqi Police and Iraqi Army. During this deployment the battalion suffered a few casualties, and had a widespread area of operation along the Syrian border and Euphrates river. The Battalion again deployed to the Persian Gulf in May–December 2009 as the Battalion Landing Team for the 22nd Marine Expeditionary Unit. In January 2010 the battalion was dispatched as part of the 22nd Marine Expeditionary Unit to take part in the relief effort Operation Unified Response following the 2010 Haiti earthquake.

In February 2011, 3/2 was deployed to the Musa Qal'eh and Now Zad districts of Helmand Province, Afghanistan to engage in combat operations in support of Operation Enduring Freedom During this deployment the Battalion had 7 Marines or Sailors Killed In Action.

Actress Mila Kunis attended 3/2's Marine Corps ball with Sgt Scott Moore after the unit returned from Afghanistan in October 2011.

== Desecration of corpses in Afghanistan ==
In January 2012 members of the battalion were identified as having been involved in the alleged desecration of corpses in Afghanistan. A video was posted on YouTube showing three Marines urinating on Taliban corpses.

== Notable former members ==
- Brian Stann
- James T. Conway
- Jason Rother

== See also ==
- Organization of the United States Marine Corps
- List of United States Marine Corps battalions
