= Ribbon Creek incident =

1956 military training mass casualty event

- Date: April 8, 1956
- Location: Marine Corps Recruit Depot Parris Island, South Carolina
- Type: Military training accident, drowning
- Deaths: 6
- Convicted: Matthew McKeon
- Convictions: Six counts of negligent homicide, drinking alcohol in enlisted barracks
- Sentence: Three months confinement, demotion to Private

The Ribbon Creek incident occurred on the night of April 8, 1956, when Staff Sergeant Matthew McKeon, a junior drill instructor at the Marine Corps Recruit Depot Parris Island, South Carolina, marched his assigned platoon into Ribbon Creek, a swampy tidal creek. The incident resulted in the deaths of six United States Marine Corps recruits. McKeon was found guilty of possession and drinking alcohol on duty and of negligent homicide.

== Incident ==
On April 8, 1956, at approximately 8 pm, Staff Sergeant Matthew McKeon, a combat veteran of World War II and the Korean War, led Platoon 71, his assigned platoon of 74 recruits, on an extra exercise to Ribbon Creek. According to a doctor's testimony given at his trial, McKeon was not intoxicated or under the influence of alcohol at the time of the exercise.

McKeon led the platoon toward a swampy tidal creek on Parris Island, near the Marine Corps recruit depot, and conducted an exercise in the creek. McKeon entered the water first. According to trial transcripts, the recruits broke formation as they entered the creek and were joking and fooling around in the water near the swamps adjacent to the Weapons Training Battalion. The platoon marched along the creek bed, but many strayed into deep water, resulting in the drowning deaths of six recruits:

- Private Thomas Curtis Hardeman
- Private First Class Donald Francis O'Shea
- Private Charles Francis Reilly
- Private Jerry Lamonte Thomas
- Private Leroy Thompson
- Private Norman Alfred Wood

== Investigation ==
Between 9:00 and 9:20 pm, Captain Charles E. Patrick (the Officer of the Day) called Colonel W. B. McKeon, the Commanding Officer of the Weapons Training Battalion, Marine Corps Recruit Depot, Parris Island. The captain reported, "We're in trouble. There are a bunch of recruits coming back to building 761 and it seems that the DI has been marching them through the swamps. I'm going down now to investigate it." The colonel responded, before proceeding further to the effect of, "Lock up the DI. Send to sickbay those that need it. Get the rest of them policed up and call me back as soon as you know the number of that platoon and the battalion."

On April 9, a Court of Inquiry was convened to inquire into the circumstances surrounding the marching of platoon 71 into Ribbon Creek. The proceedings began the next day. McKeon was initially represented by a Marine Corps attorney; on April 14, his brother-in-law Thomas P. Costello stepped in as his personal legal counsel. Costello was assisted by another New York lawyer, Jim McGarry, and by Lieutenant Jeremiah Collins, as Marine-Corps-designated defense counsel.

There had been no specific prohibition against entering the creek, as McKeon (who had ordered the drill instructor's initial confinement) notes in his memoir, Ribbon Creek. When asked by counsel for the defense whether there were any orders that prohibited using the marshes and swamp areas for training exercises, Colonel McKeon answered: "....To the best of my knowledge the only order that relates to swamps has to do with marching down around the area of Elliot's Beach ..."

During the proceedings, Costello established that night marches were common exercises. In his memoir, Ribbon Creek, McKeon writes that General "Burger's efforts to deny the practice of night marches into swamps becomes ludicrous when we analyze the argument of his ghost writer, Major Faw." McKeon confirmed this practice by asking about eighteen Marines assisting in the search of Ribbon Creek that night if they had ever marched into the swamps at night; his answer had been that a "clear majority" of them had done so.

The Court of Inquiry resulted in four charges, including possessing alcohol on base (as was shown by McKeon having a drink there at about noon), oppressing his troops, involuntary manslaughter, and negligent homicide. McKeon was also charged with drinking in front of a recruit.

McKeon was brought before the court the following day. At first, he was classified as mentally and "emotionally stable" and "a mature, stable appearing career Marine". The Court of Inquiry did decide that the detailed directives regarding and prohibiting certain Marine training methods were "correct and adequate" and that McKeon had launched an unnecessary and unauthorized disciplinary action. It was proven that McKeon had consumed several alcoholic drinks the afternoon before the night march, but it was confirmed that he was not under the influence of alcohol when he led the recruits into the creek. The recommendation was that McKeon be subject to a court-martial.

== Consequences ==
McKeon was court-martialed amidst a wave of public condemnation over the "brutality" of Marine Corps training. However, many Marines came to his defense, arguing such harsh training was necessary to survive in combat. McKeon's supervisor, Staff Sergeant E. H. Huff, testified in his defense. He described McKeon as an outstanding drill instructor and noted that night marches were very common at Parris Island. Huff said the discipline in his own platoon was so poor that he would have taken the recruits on the march himself if he had had the time.

McKeon was defended by a group of volunteer lawyers from New York City, including his brother-in-law, Thomas P. Costello, Emile Zola Berman, and Howard Lester, along with Marine Corps attorneys Lieutenant Colonel Alaric W. Valentin, Major John R. DeBarr, and Lieutenant Collins. Berman led the team, as he was a distinguished and successful trial attorney who specialized in negligence cases, but he was also dedicated to preserving the constitutional rights of the criminally accused. He had previously presented a successful criminal defense in 1954 in Alexandria, Louisiana, of a 14-year-old African-American charged with rape and would later go on to defend Sirhan Sirhan.

Marine Corps Commandant General Randolph Pate testified. One reporter pointed out this was like "calling J. Edgar Hoover to testify about a problem within the FBI". The trial's most dramatic moment, however, was the arrival of General Lewis "Chesty" Puller, the most decorated Marine in the history of the Corps. Berman called Puller to testify about training methods. Puller called the incident in Ribbon Creek "a deplorable accident", but one that did not warrant court-martial. He said that discipline was the most important factor in military training. He quoted Napoleon, saying that an army becomes a "mob" without it.

He mentioned his experiences in the Korean War and that one of the reasons troops failed was because of lack of night training. General Puller felt that the press had blown the incident out of proportion because of prejudice they had against the Marine Corps. He mentioned a similar accident at an Army post in which ten soldiers drowned and pointed out that none of their superiors had been charged and that it had never made headlines the way Ribbon Creek had.

McKeon was acquitted of manslaughter and oppression of his troops but was found guilty of negligent homicide and drinking on duty. The Secretary of the Navy, Charles S. Thomas, noted in his final action on the case:

The members of the court-martial, acting in their capacity of the equivalent to jurors in civil courts, acquitted the accused not only of all intentional or willful misconduct toward the men under his command, but acquitted him also of 'culpable' negligence with respect to the loss of life. If the accused had been found guilty of either of these two much more serious types of misconduct, i.e., 'oppression' or 'culpable' negligence, a reduction in the sentence would not be deserved, and would condone such serious misconduct. On the basis of the court's findings, however, this case presents to me the problem of adjudging an appropriate sentence for 'simple' negligence, which is not generally regarded by law or society as nearly so blameworthy as the much more serious types of misconduct classified as culpable negligence or intentional misconduct ..... Simple negligence is not 'bad conduct' in the normal meaning of the term 'bad', nor in the military connotation of that term. A bad conduct discharge therefore appears inappropriate in that respect. "In reducing the sentence and allowing Sergeant McKeon to stay in the Corps, Secretary Thomas asked if a bad conduct discharge was appropriate "under the circumstances of the principal offense for which he was convicted, which is negligent homicide based upon simple negligence." Secretary Thomas further noted the following: "There is no question in my mind that his entire record prior to 8 April 1956 indicated that Sergeant McKeon was a capable non-commissioned officer, dedicated to the United States Marine Corps. More than that, the testimony pictures him as a good man, sincere, and of a sympathetic nature. He has always attended church regularly. Even though he was relatively inexperienced as a drill instructor, his general reputation was excellent. I could not help but be impressed how recruit after recruit, who were in his platoon, who had followed him on that fatal night march, testified concerning his character. They were initially prosecution witnesses, and their testimony had the ring of sincerity. All of them, college men and men with little schooling, described him as a 'very patient man', an 'extremely patient man'. A number of them stated he helped them with their personal problems. He was always ready to give his recruits 'the breaks'. I, in my mind, am sure that Sergeant McKeon never meant to harm his men. I am convinced that a punitive separation from the service is not necessary as punishment for this man, nor would the interests of the Marine Corps be served by such a separation. For him I believe that the real punishment will be always the memory of Ribbon Creek on Sunday night, April 8, 1956. Remorse will never leave him. ... He may be expected to appreciate the feelings of those whose sons were lost that fateful night. His conduct immediately following the loss, and the spontaneous statements he made at the time, speak eloquently of remorse. For all the foregoing reasons, I have determined that the bad conduct discharge should be remitted.

Thomas reduced the sentence, remitted the bad conduct discharge, and allowed McKeon to remain in the Corps with the reduced rank of private. Prior to the reduction, his sentence was a $270 fine, nine months of confinement at hard labor, and a bad conduct discharge. The Secretary of the Navy eventually reduced the sentence to three months in the brig and reduction to private, but with no discharge or fine. McKeon then returned to active duty but never regained his former rank and was medically retired in 1959 as a corporal because of a back injury.

He then worked as an inspector of standards for his home state of Massachusetts. In a 1970 Newsweek interview, McKeon told of his lifelong burden of guilt and how he prayed every day for God to keep the dead recruits in his safekeeping and for McKeon's own forgiveness. McKeon died on November 11, 2003, at age 79.

=== Published works ===
John C. Stevens researched the night march and subsequent court-martial and wrote a book called Court Martial At Parris Island. He was able to interview many of McKeon's recruits. Stevens pointed out that with one exception, all of them spoke in favorable terms about their former drill instructor. They claimed he was not the sadist portrayed by the prosecution.

Marie Costello Inserra, daughter of Thomas P. Costello, became an attorney and was admitted to practice law in New York in 1988 and North Carolina since 2006. She also wrote a book called Counsel for the Accused Marine Corps Drill Sergeant. It is largely based upon the transcripts of the court of inquiry, the trial, her father's diary and conversations with her father.

=== Training changes ===
The incident led to several changes in Marine Corps recruit training, following reforms that had begun in the early 1950s in the wake of the Korean War and the sudden large influx of recruits into the Corps. Recruit Training Commands (RTCs) commanded by brigadier generals, directly appointed by and answering to the commandant, were established at both Parris Island and Marine Corps Recruit Depot San Diego. Within the commands, officers were selected to oversee recruit training down to the series level—typically a first lieutenant (O-2) or captain (O-3).

New drill instructor schools were established within each command, and drill instructors (DIs) were more carefully selected. The number of DIs assigned to each platoon was increased from two to three, and the role of the DI was reformed to emphasize example, leadership, persuasion, and psychology in the process of recruit training.

The Special Training Company (STC) was established to provide remedial training to recruits needing additional physical conditioning, motivation or education, and rehabilitation to recruits suffering from medical conditions. The campaign hat was introduced as a distinctive element of DI dress, in part to recognize a new norm of professionalism and specialization within the DI billet and also to signify a break between the "old" era of recruit training and the "new".

== Public opinion and media coverage ==
The incident was the subject of significant media coverage and the United States Congress launched its own investigation into it. Several publications, including Time magazine, reported thoroughly on the development of the trial. The trial was covered by every national and many local newspapers. Jim Bishop wrote extensively in his syndicated column about the trial and the Marine Corps in general. Bishop's columns on this trial and other significant events that he covered appear in a collection entitled Jim Bishop: Reporter (Random House 1966).

Following the Ribbon Creek incident, the Marine Corps was deluged with requests from various producers seeking to highlight Marine Corps brutality. However, the Marine Corps provided assistance in the making of the 1957 film The D.I., which Jack Webb both directed and starred in as the title character. The movie depicted a patriotic, pro-Marine Corps point of view on the need for high pressure basic training. The film was written by James Lee Barrett and was based on his teleplay for Kraft Television Theatre, Murder of a Sand Flea.

== See also ==
- Death of Lee Mirecki
- Kurkse tragedy
- Death of Jason Rother
- "Waist Deep in the Big Muddy"
