= Rother (surname) =

Rother (or Röther) is a surname. It can refer to:

- Anthony Rother (born 1972), German electronic music composer, producer and label owner
- Artur Rother (1885–1972), German opera conductor
- Björn Rother (born 1996), German footballer
- Caitlin Rother (born 1962), Canadian-born American author and journalist
- Helene Rother (1908–1999), German-born American automotive and industrial designer
- Jason Rother (1969–1988), American Marine Corps Lance Corporal whose abandonment caused a scandal
- Joachim Rother (1948–2021), German swimmer
- Leopold Rother (1894–1978), German architect, urban planner, and educator
- Michael Rother (born 1950), German musician and composer
- Mike Rother (born 1958), American engineer, researcher, teacher
- Sabine Röther (born 1957), East German handball player
- Stanley Rother (1935–1981), American Catholic priest, missionary, and murder victim
- Wilfried Rother (born 1990), French footballer
