= Matthew McKeon =

United States Marine (1924–2003)

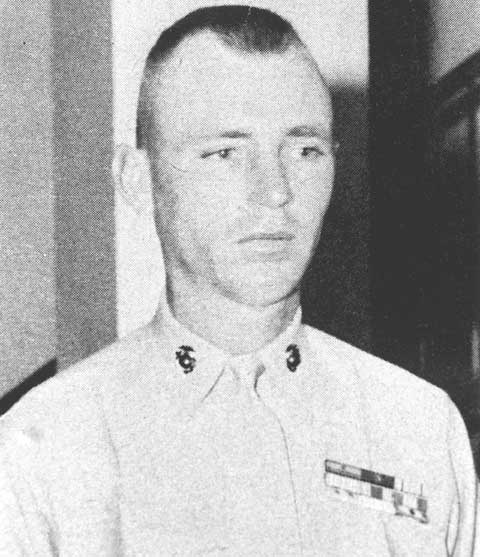
- Born: October 26, 1924
- Died: November 11, 2003 (aged 79); West Boylston, Massachusetts, US
- Burial place: Leicester, Massachusetts, US
- Military career
- Allegiance: United States
- Branch: United States Marine Corps; United States Navy
- Service years: 1942–1948 (Navy); 1948–1959 (Marine Corps)
- Unit: 3rd Recruit Training Battalion
- Conflicts: World War II; Korean War: Battle of Chosin Reservoir

Matthew McKeon (October 26, 1924 – November 11, 2003) was a U.S. Marine. As a staff sergeant, he gained notoriety when the Ribbon Creek incident on April 8, 1956, led to the drowning of six recruits. McKeon was found guilty of negligent homicide and drinking on duty. He finished his career as a corporal.

== Combat experience ==
McKeon was born into a very large, close family of the Catholic faith. He served in the United States Navy during World War II aboard the USS Essex. Following his discharge from the Navy, McKeon went to work in a factory, where he later remarked it was heavy toil. Following the loss of that job due to the factory's closure, McKeon enlisted in the U.S. Marine Corps. He mentioned how harsh the training at Parris Island was at the time. For example, he and his fellow recruits were once forced to crawl through pig manure as part of a drill. McKeon served in the Korean War for fourteen months as the leader of a machine gun squad.

After the war, McKeon was selected for drill instructor training. He completed the rigorous school, graduating 14th out of 55 (the school originally had 90 candidates). His superiors thought him bright, hard-working and alert. The psychiatrists who examined him found no evidence of mental abnormality, but did mention he had a tendency towards impulsivity.

== Ribbon Creek incident ==
McKeon was assigned to Platoon 71, "A" Company, 3rd Recruit Training Battalion. On the Sunday of April 8, 1956, he had reprimanded the entire platoon for unsatisfactory performance and said that remedial training was to come. He then went to a local bar around noon, and decided on the type of punishment after having four shots of vodka. Around 8 pm, he returned to the depot and ordered the platoon to march to Ribbon Creek, a tidal stream near the base, as part of a team-building exercise. This order did not raise suspicion at first as earlier drill instructors had sometimes prescribed this exercise. However, McKeon's decreased alertness due to his drinking had caused confusion, and he failed to account for pockets in the stream known as "trout holes", where six of the recruits had fallen into and drowned. McKeon promptly ordered the training stood down and attempted to rescue the recruits, then alerted his superior officers.

The ill-fated march set off immediate repercussions which shook Marine Corps training from top to bottom. Moreover, an uninterrupted flood of publicity by the press, radio, and television divided the country into two camps, those who condemned McKeon for what had happened and those who sympathized with him.

General Randolph McCall Pate, Commandant of the Marine Corps at the time of the incident and the time of McKeon's trial, testified as a witness for the defense.

His court-martial began at Parris Island on July 16, 1956. Retired Marine Corps `Lieutenant General Lewis B. "Chesty" Puller testified on McKeon's behalf, though he did privately reprimand McKeon. McKeon was represented by noted defense attorney Emile Zola Berman.

== Aftermath ==
McKeon was acquitted on August 4, 1956, of charges of manslaughter and oppression of troops. He was found guilty of negligent homicide and drinking on duty.

The sentence was a $270 fine, nine months of confinement at hard labor, rank reduced to private and a bad conduct discharge. The Secretary of the Navy later retained the demotion, but reduced the sentence to three months in the brig and overturned the discharge and fine. The incident had also prompted an investigation into the recruit training program and selection of Marines to become drill instructors. Dozens of drill instructors were determined to be unfit for duty and reassigned.

McKeon was transferred to a Marine base in Cherry Point, North Carolina, and attempted to rebuild his shattered career. He was forced to take a job in the enlisted men's kitchen to augment his meager pay. He was eventually promoted to corporal but had to retire in 1959 due to medical problems.

McKeon lived out the rest of his life in West Boylston, Massachusetts, and made his living as an inspector of standards for the state. In 1970, in an interview with Newsweek, McKeon stated that he carried the memories of the Ribbon Creek tragedy often, but especially when he was invited to a wedding, remarking that his actions denied the dead recruits their own wedding day, and by now they would have likely had children of their own. He said he prayed every day begging God for forgiveness and to keep the boys in His safekeeping. McKeon died in 2003, and was survived by his wife, five children and eight grandchildren.

== Literature ==
- Counsel for the Accused Marine Corps Drill Sergeant, by Marie Costello Inserra, 2016 ISBN 978-0-692-59524-4
- Court-Martial at Parris Island: The Ribbon Creek Incident (1999) ISBN 1-55750-814-3
- The U.S. Marine Corps in Crisis: Ribbon Creek and Recruit Training (1990) ISBN 0-87249-635-X
