= Death of Lee Mirecki =

1988 drowing during a military training exercise

Lee Mirecki
- Born: December 10, 1968; Appleton, Wisconsin
- Died: March 2, 1988 (aged 19) Pensacola, Florida
- Buried: Boulder Junction, Wisconsin
- Branch: United States Navy
- Rank: Seaman recruit

Lee Mirecki was a 19-year-old United States Navy sailor from Appleton, Wisconsin, who was killed by drowning during a "sharks and daisies" military rescue training exercise on March 2, 1988. His death became a cause célèbre among those campaigning against bullying in military training regimes. As a result of his death a number of procedures and guidelines within the Navy's training programs were changed. He is cited by name in the Navy documentation supporting these changes.

== Background ==
Mirecki completed boot camp from Orlando Florida company C246, but the events that led to his death began before his entry into SAR school when basic swimming tests showed his fear of water, which had been present since childhood. Subsequently questions arose as to whether he could pass the requirements to be a Rescue Swimmer, including Rescue Swimmer School (ARSS), which was developed to prepare recruits for retrieving downed aircraft carrier-based airmen under wartime conditions. Recruits must be in peak physical condition, and the course has a 50% attrition rate.

As part of the ARSS program, which is held in Pensacola, recruits must successfully complete a drill known as sharks and daisies. In this drill, students swim in a circle with their hands behind their backs, equipped with flippers but no safety apparatus. Instructors take a (head) hold on the student and attempt to simulate panicking victims in need of rescue. A student failing to perform the release maneuver correctly is given additional instruction.

RSS allowed for "drop on request" (DOR), which Mirecki had already done once, in February 1988, following failure to complete the "sharks and daisies" drill. There are questions to how he was allowed to return, but some believe RSS instructors may have reminded Mirecki that his DOR request would cost him his technical skill training and send him to the naval fleet as an undesignated seaman assigned to the ship's deck force.

== Death ==
At the time of his death, Mirecki was training to become an Aviation Anti-Submarine Warfare Operator (AW) Rescue Swimmer, despite a childhood fear of being under water. According to reports, at least two of the instructors on duty that day were aware of Mirecki's earlier problem with the drill. On March 2, Mirecki had left the pool, saying he was resigning from the Navy; however, he tried again the following day. Once again, Mirecki had difficulty with the drill and requested that he be dropped from the course and not be forced to re-enter the pool. Instead of honoring his request, the instructors reportedly seized him and forced him back into the water, then began "smurfing" him (holding him under the water) until he lost consciousness. At this time, other recruits were commanded to line up, turn their backs and sing the national anthem.

Mirecki died from a heart arrhythmia, ventricular fibrillation, secondary to hypoxia, consistent with a death by drowning.

== US Navy response ==
The Navy did not begin an investigation until a reporter from the Pensacola News Journal received an anonymous tip with information and reason to investigate the incident. When the management of the newspaper refused to publish the reporter's account, the reporter quit her job at the newspaper. The family then contacted members of Congress and the press. After two months of media, family, and Congressional pressure, the Navy began an investigation, and charged six petty officers in association with the case. Petty Officer 2nd Class Michael Combe was found guilty of negligent homicide and conspiracy to commit battery. He was sentenced to 90 days in the brig, a letter of reprimand and reduction in rank to petty officer 3rd class.

=== Procedural changes ===
ARSS was temporarily closed following Mirecki's death to allow for changes in training method, including the elimination of the sharks and daisies routine. Students were also allowed to quit at first request.

=== Legal actions ===
On January 25, 1990, Mirecki's mother, Elaine Kitowski, as personal representative of her son's estate, filed a wrongful death action under the Federal Tort Claims Act in the United States District Court for the Southern District of Florida. The court dismissed the suit and held that the claim was barred under the FTCA. Kitowski appealed; on May 29, 1991, the United States Court of Appeals for the Eleventh Circuit upheld the lower court's dismissal and the Supreme Court declined to hear the case.

== See also ==
- Ribbon Creek incident
