= William Toti =

American naval officer and author (born 1957)

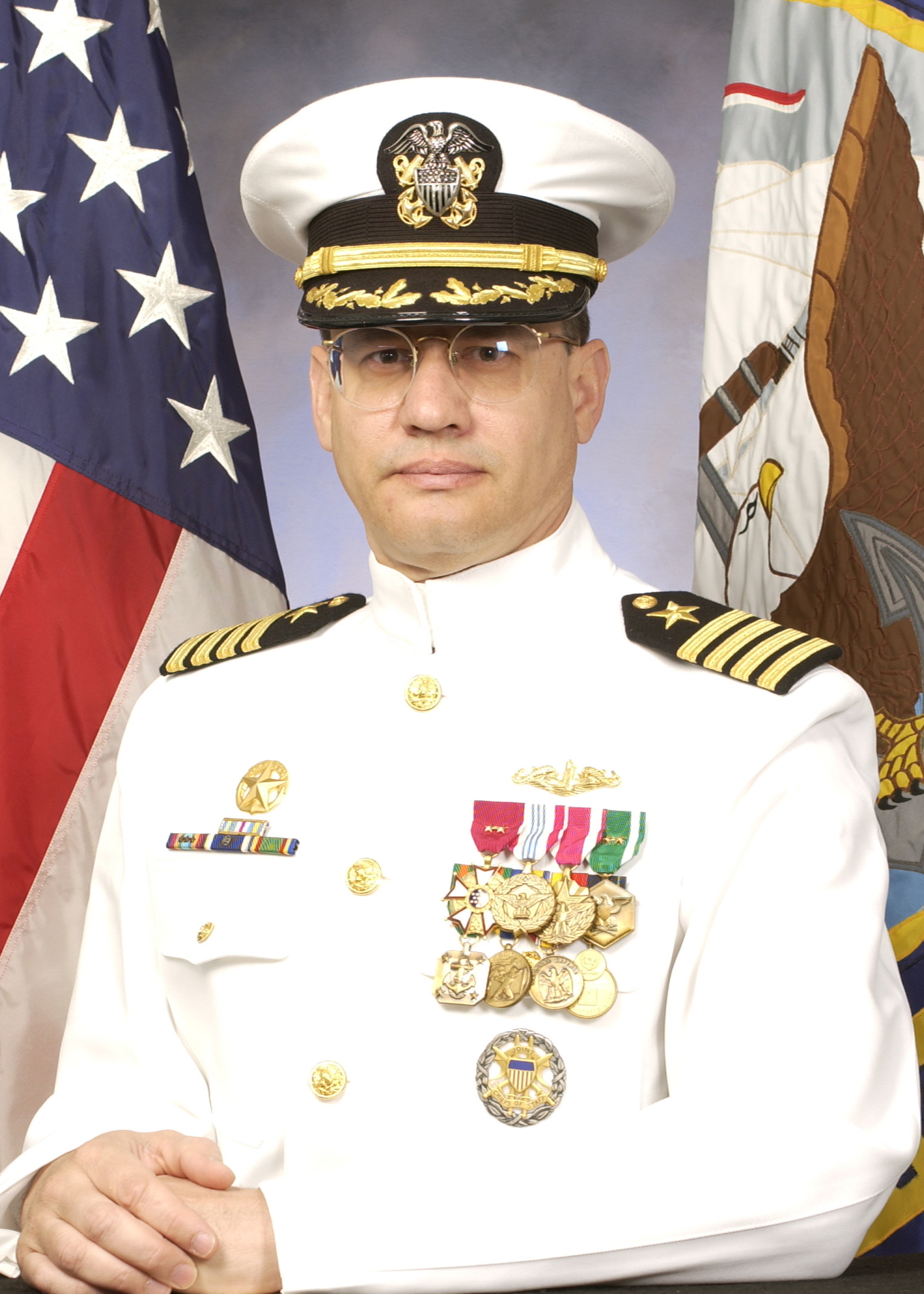
- Official portrait, 2003

Performing the Duties of United States Under Secretary of the Navy
- In office May 1, 2026 – September 15, 2026; Served while Hung Cao served as Acting Secretary of the Navy
- President: Donald Trump
- Preceded by: Hung Cao
- Succeeded by: Hung Cao

Personal details
- Born: William Joseph Toti; January 15, 1957 (age 69) Youngstown, Ohio, U.S.
- Education: United States Naval Academy; Naval Postgraduate School
- Awards: Legion of Merit (7 awards); Defense Meritorious Service Medal; Meritorious Service Medal (2 awards)

Military service
- Allegiance: United States
- Branch/service: United States Navy
- Years of service: 1974–2006
- Rank: Captain
- Commands: USS Indianapolis; Submarine Squadron 3

William Joseph Toti (born January 15, 1957) is an American Christian minister, author, retired corporate executive, and retired naval officer who performed the duties of Under Secretary of the Navy from May to September 2026. He founded a ministry for active duty military and veterans, and prior to entering government service, co-hosted a World War II podcast called the "Unauthorized History of the Pacific War".

In the Navy, Toti was the final captain of the Los Angeles-class submarine USS Indianapolis (SSN-697) and was commodore of Submarine Squadron 3 in Pearl Harbor, Hawaii. He is known for his role in the exoneration of Captain Charles B. McVay III of the World War II cruiser USS Indianapolis (CA-35), as well as for his actions during the September 11, 2001 terrorist attack on the Pentagon. He authored the 2022 book From CO to CEO: A Practical Guide for Transitioning from Military to Industry Leadership.

== Early life and education ==
Toti was born in Youngstown, Ohio and grew up in Campbell, Ohio, graduating from Memorial High School in 1974. He later entered the United States Naval Academy, graduating in 1979 with a degree in physics. Subsequently, he entered the US Navy's nuclear power program and after completing his nuclear power training and submarine school, Toti joined the submarine force in 1980.

Toti attended the Naval Postgraduate School in Monterey, California from 1984 to 1986, graduating with the first group of Space Systems Engineers in 1986. He was nominated by the US Navy for Astronaut Mission Specialist in 1987 but failed NASA vision screening.

== Career Events ==
=== US Navy ===
Toti took command of the submarine USS Indianapolis in January 1997. During his command, the Indianapolis was awarded the Battle Efficiency E and a Navy Unit Commendation, and Toti was awarded the first of his seven Legion of Merit awards for achievement during that deployment. In 1999, he became the Special Assistant to the Vice Chief of Naval Operations and was stationed at the Pentagon.

As the United States prepared for its invasion of Iraq, in 2003 Toti organized and led a military exercise that utilized submarines and special forces in a counter-terrorism operation. called "Giant Shadow." During that event, Toti was featured in the CBS Newsprogram "60 Minutes" in 2003 with correspondent Scott Pelley.

Toti was commodore of Submarine Squadron 3 in Pearl Harbor, Hawaii from 2003 to 2004. At the time of Toti's command, Submarine Squadron 3 was the largest submarine squadron in the US Navy, with six Los Angeles-class nuclear fast attack submarines assigned, to include Honolulu, Louisville, Olympia, Columbia, Chicago, and Key West.

Toti's final active duty assignment was to establish and be the first commanding officer of Fleet Antisubmarine Warfare (ASW) Command, Norfolk, Virginia. During this tour, in 2005 Toti authored a new maritime doctrine titled "Full Spectrum ASW." Widely regarded as a sea change in the method by which naval forces countered submarines, his treatise on the subject also received wide attention internationally. During this assignment, he was also called upon by the Navy to defend the use of active sonar for antisubmarine training, arguing for the practice during controversial public hearings near populations affected by the beaching of marine mammals.

=== Exoneration of Captain McVay ===
While commanding officer of the submarine USS Indianapolis (SSN-697), Toti was recruited by the survivors of the World War II cruiser USS Indianapolis (CA-35) to assist in their effort to clear the name of Captain Charles B. McVay III, who was captain of the cruiser at the time it was sunk by Imperial Japanese Submarine I-58, and who had been court-martialed following their ship's sinking.

In response, Toti authored the article on the McVay affair, titled "The Sinking of the Indy and the Responsibility of Command," published in the US Naval Institute Proceedings in October 1999. Later Toti helped Admiral Donald Pilling prepare his testimony in front of a US Senate committee hearing on the McVay court-martial. McVay was exonerated in 2000. Toti's role in the McVay affair was described in the books In Harms Way by Doug Stanton and Indianapolis by Lynn Vincent and Sara Vladic. As a result, Toti was named an Honorary Survivor by the USS Indianapolis Survivors' Organization in 2005.

Toti's role in helping to clear McVay's name was covered in the 2016 documentary film USS Indianapolis: the Legacy, directed by Sara Vladic. The documentary won several awards at GI Film Festivals in both Washington, DC, and San Diego, California. In September 2017, Toti was also featured in a PBS live broadcast titled USS Indianapolis, Live from the Deep, and in 2019 he was featured in the PBS documentary USS Indianapolis: Final Chapter.

=== Response during the September 11, 2001 Attack on the Pentagon ===
Toti was on duty in the Pentagon at the time of the September 11 attack by terrorists who took control of American Airlines Flight 77. Some of his activity during the rescue effort was captured in ABC News video footage of the event. In the hours after the crash, Toti helped set up a makeshift morgue at the Pentagon, which was ultimately never used, as the FBI had decided to leave the remains inside the building without informing Toti. In October 2001, he received his second Legion of Merit from Chief of Naval Operations Admiral Vern Clark for his actions during the attack. His narrative from that day, titled "Antoinette," was incorporated into the introduction of the 2006 book "Operation Homecoming," edited by Andrew Carroll and published by Random House. A video recording of his narrative was created for the history project titled "Voices of 9.11." He was featured in the 2016 PBS documentary, Inside the Pentagon, in the 2020 History Channel documentary The Pentagon, and in episode three of the 2021 National Geographic 6-episode docuseries "9/11: One Day in America". Toti is a lifetime member of the National Eagle Scouts Association, and in 2002 was awarded the BSA Honor Medal by the National Council for his actions during the 9/11 attack.

=== Industry ===
After retiring from the Navy in 2006, Toti had vice president positions at Raytheon, Hewlett Packard, where he led the company’s defense business, and as president of Cubic Global Defense and as president of L3 Technology’s Navy line of business a recipient of the “Wash 100” list of most influential leaders in the government contractor sector (2016), HP Executive of the Year (2013), the FedScoop 50 Industry Leadership Award (2012), and the Rear Admiral John J. Bergen Industry Award from the Navy League of the United States (2010). From 2018 he was chief executive officer of Sparton Corporation, retiring in 2022.

=== Author and News Commentator ===
Toti has authored op-ed pieces published in The Wall Street Journal, The Washington Times, The Baltimore Sun, the Orlando Sentinel, The Hill, and Foreign Affairs. Toti also wrote the foreword and afterword of a book on the history of the cruiser USS Indianapolis, titled Ordeal by Sea by Thomas Helm and published by Penguin Books. In 2022 he released his first book, titled "From CO to CEO: A Practical Guide for Transitioning from Military to Industry Leadership," published by Forefront Books and distributed by Simon & Schuster. He has also served as a commentator on naval and military matters on Fox News and Newsnation. He is now under contract to write a World War II history book titled, "The Killing Sea."

=== Photographer ===
Beginning in 2013, Toti began to achieve recognition as a landscape photographer. His photos have been published in Landscape Photographer, Destinations, and N-Photo magazines. He was featured in Nikon Asia magazine, in an article titled Transcending Appeal. In 2015, Toti published a book of photographs, Safari: Images of African, and his photograph of Tunnel View at Yosemite was published in the National Parks Conservation Association book, "A Century of Impact."

=== Podcaster/YouTube Host ===
Toti is co-host of one of the world’s most popular YouTube podcast on World War II "Unauthorized History of The Pacific War," with former chief historian for The National WWII Museum Seth Paridon. As of March 2025, the podcast has over 160 episodes with more than fifteen million views.

=== Crimson Tide ===
In 1993 while Toti was executive officer of the Trident missile submarine USS Florida (SSBN-728), a group of filmmakers from Hollywood Pictures including Jerry Bruckheimer and Don Simpson embarked in USS Florida to conduct research into the storyline of a film to be titled Crimson Tide. During that research, Toti was filmed doing much of what actor Denzel Washington does in the movie, which was released globally in 1995.

Toti then authored a sequel to Crimson Tide, titled "The Genocide Game." The plot-line of "The Genocide Game" involved Crimson Tide lead character Hunter in command of Los Angeles-class fast attack submarine USS Indianapolis. In The Genocide Game, Hunter discovers an Iranian submarine that has been taken control of by al-Qaeda terrorists, who then use the Iranian submarine to threaten New York City. Toti shared the script with Crimson Tide screenwriter Michael Schiffer, and the two of them collectively pitched this story to Bruckheimer, who rejected the idea of doing a sequel. Toti then entered the screenplay into the Academy of Motion Pictures Arts and Sciences Nicholl Screenwriting Contest where The Genocide Game finished as a 2001 semi-finalist.

=== Ministry ===
Subsequent to retiring from industry, Toti began Christian theological studies at Grace School of Theology, received ordination as a Christian minister in December 2024, and started a ministry named “No Greater Love,” located in Brevard County, Florida, to serve active duty and veteran families.

== Works ==
=== Books ===
———. Toti, William. (2022) From CO to CEO: A Practical Guide for Transitioning from Military to Industry Leadership. Nashville, TN: Forefront Books. OCLC 1282602634 ISBN 978-1-63763-063-1.

=== Articles and Contributions ===
———. (Sept 1992) "Sea-Air-Land Battle Doctrine." USNI Proceedings, retrieved Jan 27, 2026.

———. (April 1995) "Who Needs the Space Command?." USNI Proceedings, retrieved Jan 27, 2026.

———. (Oct 1999) "The Sinking of the Indy & Responsibility of Command." USNI Proceedings, retrieved Jan 27, 2026.

———. (June 2000) "Fast Attacks and Boomers: The Smithsonian Exhibit."." USNI Proceedings, retrieved Jan 27, 2026.

———. (July 2000) "Stop the Revolution I Want to Get Off." USNI Proceedings, retrieved Jan 27, 2026.

———. (May 2001) "Confessions of a Reformed Revolutionary.." USNI Proceedings, retrieved Jan 27, 2026.

———. (June 2001) "DOD's Tail is Wagging the Dog."." USNI Proceedings, retrieved Jan 27, 2026.

———. (Oct 2001) "Antoinette." US Navy History & Heritage Command, retrieved Jan 27, 2026.

———. (Oct 14, 2001) "Six Thousand Antoinettes." The Washington Times, retrieved Jan 27, 2026.

———. (Sept 2002) "One Year Later: Frozen in Time." USNI Proceedings, retrieved Jan 27, 2026.

———. (Aug 2004) "Three Thousand Antoinettes." The New York Times, retrieved Jan 27, 2026.

———. (Dec 2008) "Write with your Eyes Open." USNI Proceedings, retrieved Jan 27, 2026.

———. (June 2010) "The Wrath of Rickover"." USNI Proceedings, retrieved Jan 27, 2026.

———. (June 2014) "The Hunt for Full-Spectrum ASW." USNI Proceedings, retrieved Jan 27, 2026.

———. (Feb 2017) "Now Hear This...To the New Administration: Deliver Real Changes".." USNI Proceedings, retrieved Jan 27, 2026.

———. (May 2017) "Overreacting to Tweets Undermines US Messages".." USNI Proceedings, retrieved Jan 27, 2026.

———. (June 2017) "Defense Acquisition Processes are the Enemy".." USNI Proceedings, retrieved Jan 27, 2026.

———. (July 2017) "No More 'Low-Priced Brains' in Defense Planning." USNI Proceedings, retrieved Jan 27, 2026.

———. (July 2017) "Where are the Cyber Warriors?".." USNI Proceedings, retrieved Jan 27, 2026.

———. (Aug 2017) "Collisions: Did Culture Trump Technology?".." USNI Proceedings, retrieved Jan 27, 2026.

———. (Aug 2017) "Operational Ambiguity is Important."." USNI Proceedings, retrieved Jan 27, 2026.

———. (Oct 2017) "Sometimes Wonderful Just Comes Too Late." USNI Proceedings, retrieved Jan 27, 2026.

———. (June 2019) "Beware the Permanent Demise of Temporariness.." USNI Proceedings, retrieved Jan 27, 2026.

———. (April 2020) "Command at Sea: What's Love Got to Do with It?".." USNI Proceedings, retrieved Jan 27, 2026.

———. (April 6, 2020) "A Failure of Discipline under Captain Crozier's Command." The Wall Street Journal, retrieved Jan 27, 2026.

———. (July 9, 2020) "13 Lessons from the Crozier Controversy. Defense One, retrieved Jan 27, 2026.

———. (July 9, 2020) "Stalin and the Confederacy." The Wall Street Journal, retrieved Jan 27, 2026.

———. (Nov 5, 2022) "The Human Cost of Pride." World Magazine, retrieved Jan 27, 2026.

———. (Feb 7, 2023) "Who is the Sleeping Giant Now?" The Hill. retrieved Jan 27, 2026.

———. (Nov 12, 2023) "Avoiding another 'Battle of the Crater' in Gaza." The Orlando Sentinel, retrieved Jan 27, 2026.

———. (Dec 2023) "You Can't Win Without More Submarines".." USNI Proceedings, retrieved Jan 27, 2026.

———. (Dec 21, 2023) "The Navy needs a ‘Yorktown Plan’ for submarines to defeat China." The Hill. retrieved Jan 27, 2026.

———. (Nov 2024) "A Ruthless Focus on Building More Nuclear Submarines".." USNI Proceedings, retrieved Jan 27, 2026.

=== Documentaries ===
Year	Title	Produced By
2015	USS Indianapolis: The Legacy	Tiny Horse Productions
2016	Inside the Pentagon	PBS
2017	USS Indianapolis: Live from the Deep	PBS
2019	USS Indianapolis: The Final Chapter	PBS
2020	9/11: The Pentagon	The History Channel
2021	9/11: One Day in America	National Geographic Channel
2022	The Lost Ships of World War II	Fox Nation

== Awards and decorations ==

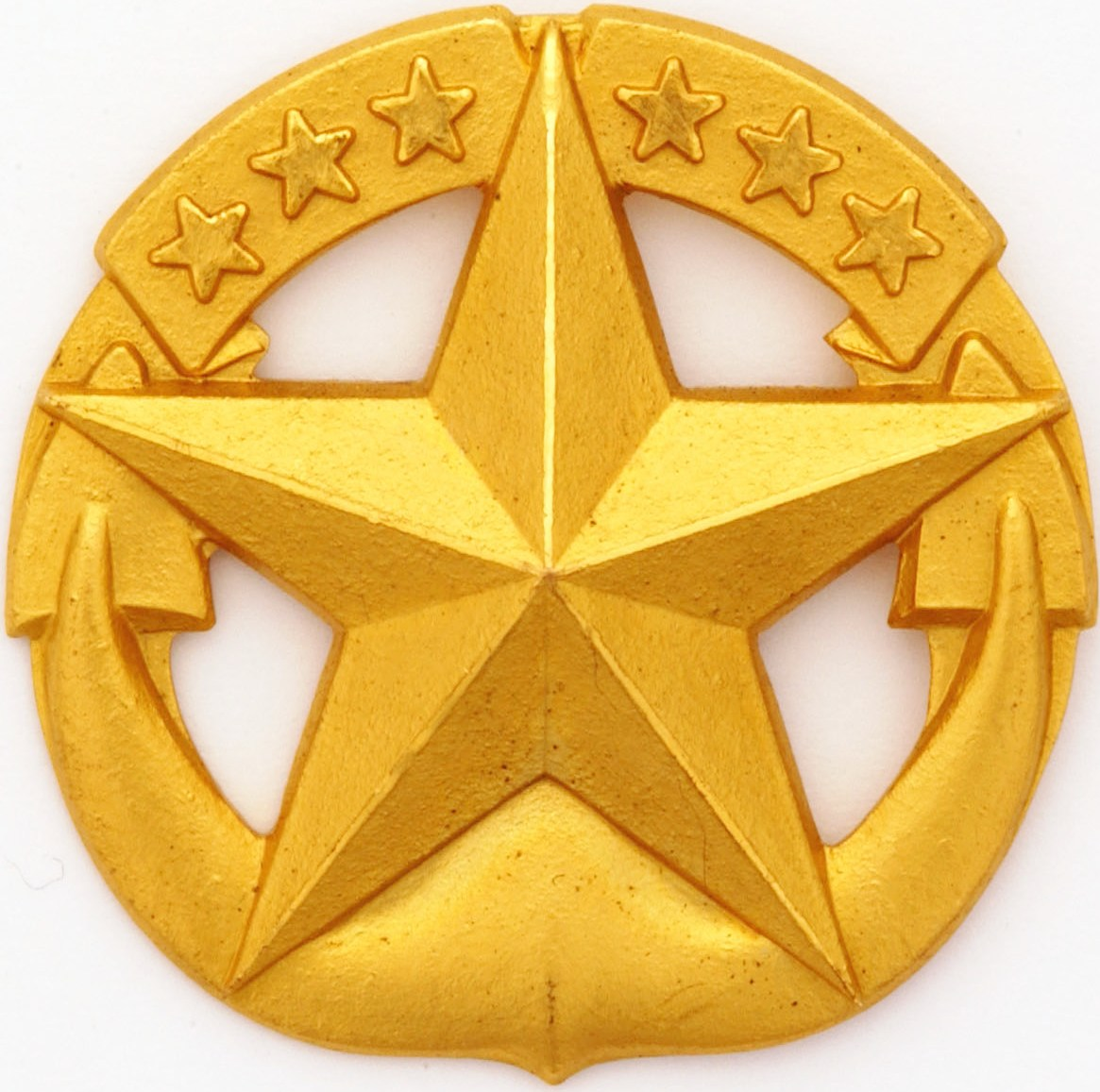

Submarine Warfare Insignia
Legion of Merit w/ 6 gold award stars	Defense Meritorious Service Medal	
Meritorious Service Medal w/ 1 award stars	Navy and Marine Corps Commendation Medal w/ 2 award stars	Navy and Marine Corps Achievement Medal w/ 1 award star
Joint Meritorious Unit Award	Navy Unit Commendation w/ 1 bronze service star	Navy "E" Ribbon with wreathed Battle E device
Navy Expeditionary Medal	National Defense Service Medal with 2 service stars	Global War on Terrorism Service Medal
Navy Sea Service Deployment Ribbon w/ 4 bronze service star	Navy Expert Rifle Shot Medal	Navy Expert Pistol Shot Medal
Command at Sea insignia
Joint Chiefs of Staff Badge

Political offices
Preceded by Hung Cao	Performing the Duties of United States Under Secretary of the Navy; 2026; Served alongside: Hung Cao (official capacity)	Succeeded by Hung Cao
