= Charles B. McVay III =

WWII United States Navy officer (1898–1968)

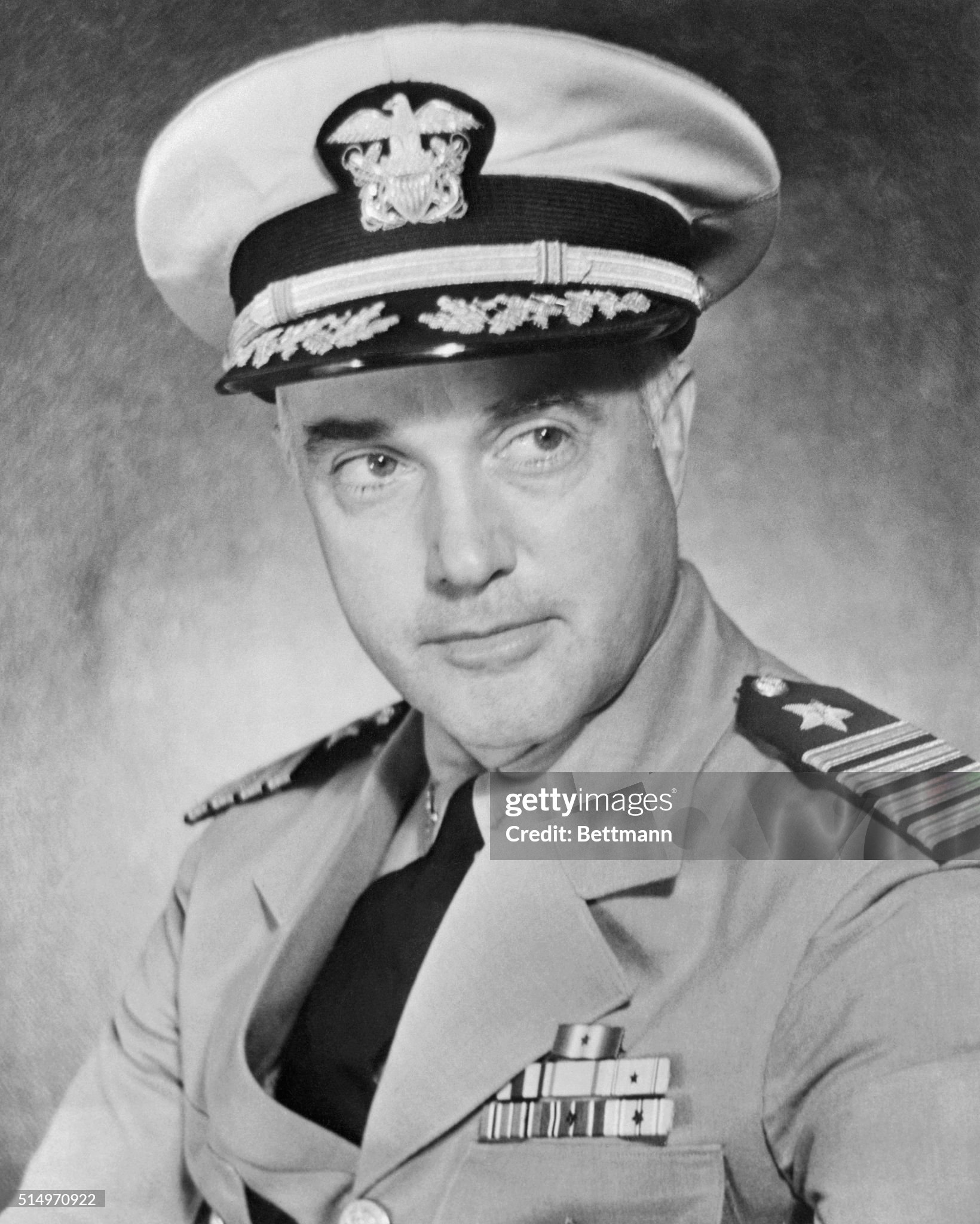
- McVay c. 1945
- Born: Charles Butler McVay III; August 31, 1898; Ephrata, Pennsylvania, U.S.
- Died: November 6, 1968 (aged 70); Litchfield, Connecticut, U.S.
- Burial place: Bayou Liberty, Louisiana, U.S.
- Spouses: Elizabeth "Kinau" Wilder (m. 1924; div. 1936) Louise Claytor (m. 1936; died 1961) Vivian Brown (m. 1961)
- Children: Charles Butler McVay IV; Kimo Wilder McVay
- Military career
- Allegiance: United States of America
- Branch: United States Navy
- Service years: 1920–1949
- Rank: Rear Admiral
- Commands: USS Indianapolis (CA-35)
- Conflicts: World War II: Battle of Iwo Jima; Battle of Okinawa; Sinking of the USS Indianapolis
- Awards: Silver Star; Purple Heart; Navy Unit Commendation

Charles Butler McVay III (August 31, 1898 – November 6, 1968) was an American naval officer and the commanding officer of the cruiser USS Indianapolis which was lost in action in 1945, resulting in a significant loss of life. Of all captains in the history of the United States Navy, he is the only one subjected to court-martial for losing a ship sunk by an act of war, despite the fact that he was on a top secret mission maintaining radio silence.

The testimony of Mochitsura Hashimoto, the Japanese commander who sank his ship, also seemed to exonerate him. After years of mental health problems, McVay died by suicide at 70 years old. Following years of efforts by some survivors and others to clear his name, he was posthumously exonerated by the 106th United States Congress and President Bill Clinton on October 30, 2000.

== Education and career ==
Charles Butler McVay III was born in Ephrata, Pennsylvania, on August 31, 1898, to a Navy family. His father, Charles Butler McVay Jr. (1868–1949), commanded the tender Yankton during the cruise of the Great White Fleet (1907–1909), was an admiral in the United States Navy during World War I, and served as Commander-in-Chief of the Asiatic Fleet in the early 1930s.

Charles III was a 1920 graduate of the United States Naval Academy at Annapolis, Maryland. Before taking command of Indianapolis in November 1944, McVay was chairman of the Joint Intelligence Committee of the Combined Chiefs of Staff in Washington, D.C., the Allies' highest intelligence unit. Earlier in World War II, he was awarded the Silver Star for displaying courage under fire.

McVay led the ship through the invasion of Iwo Jima, then the bombardment of Okinawa in the spring of 1945, during which Indianapolis anti-aircraft guns shot down seven enemy planes before the ship was struck by a kamikaze on March 31. The strike inflicted heavy casualties, including eight dead, and penetrated the ship's hull. McVay returned the ship safely to Mare Island in California for repairs.

== Sinking of Indianapolis ==
Later that year, Indianapolis received orders to carry parts and nuclear material to Tinian to be used in the atomic bombs which were soon to be dropped on Hiroshima and Nagasaki. After delivery, the ship was en route to report for further duty off Okinawa.

Early on July 30, 1945, Indianapolis was attacked by the I-58 under Commander Mochitsura Hashimoto. Hashimoto launched six torpedoes and hit Indianapolis twice. The first removed over forty feet of her bow, the second hit the starboard side below the bridge. Indianapolis immediately took a fifteen degree list, capsized and sank within 12 minutes. Of the crew of 1,195 men, 879 died, in one of the greatest disasters in US naval history.

== Delayed rescue ==
About 300 of the 1,196 men on board either died in the initial attack or were trapped belowdecks and drowned when compartments were sealed to prevent sinking. The remainder of the crew, about 900 men, abandoned ship. Some were left floating in the water, many without lifeboats, until the rescue of 316 survivors was completed four days later. Because of Navy protocol regarding secret missions, the ship was not reported "overdue". Rescue came only after survivors were spotted by pilot Lieutenant Wilber (Chuck) Gwinn and co-pilot Lieutenant Warren Colwell on a routine patrol flight. Of those who did abandon ship, most casualties were due to injuries sustained aboard the ship, dehydration, exhaustion, drinking salt water and shark attacks. The seas had been moderate, but visibility was not good. Indianapolis had been steaming at 15.7 knots (29.1 km/h). When the ship did not reach Leyte on the 31st, as scheduled, no report was made that she was overdue. This omission was officially recorded later as "due to a misunderstanding of the Movement Report System".

== Court-martial ==
McVay was wounded but survived, and was among those rescued. He repeatedly asked the Navy why it took four days to rescue his men but never received an answer. The Navy long claimed that SOS messages were never received because the ship was operating under a policy of radio silence; declassified records show that three SOS messages were received separately. None were acted upon because one commander was drunk, another thought it was a Japanese ruse, and the third had given orders not to be disturbed.

After a Navy Court of Inquiry recommended that McVay be court-martialed for the loss of Indianapolis, Admiral Chester Nimitz disagreed and instead issued the captain a letter of reprimand. Admiral Ernest King overturned Nimitz's decision and recommended a court-martial, which Secretary of the Navy James Forrestal later convened. McVay was charged with failing to zigzag and failure to order abandon ship in a timely manner. He was convicted on the former. Knowledge of Japanese submarines in the area was withheld from the court and from McVay, prior to sailing. The court sentenced McVay to lose 100 numbers in his temporary rank of Captain and 100 numbers in his permanent rank of Commander. However, in 1946, at the behest of Admiral Nimitz who had become Chief of Naval Operations, Secretary of the Navy Forrestal remitted McVay's sentence and restored him to duty.

Hashimoto, the Japanese submarine commander, was on record as describing visibility at the time as fair, which is corroborated by the fact that he was able to target and sink Indianapolis in the first place. He also testified that zigzagging would not have made a difference, as he would have still sunk Indianapolis due to being in such a good position to do so. American submarine experts testified that "zigzagging" was a technique of negligible value in eluding enemy submarines. Hashimoto also testified to this effect. Despite that testimony, the court held McVay responsible for failing to zigzag.

An additional point of controversy is evidence that the admirals in the United States Navy held some responsibility for placing the ship in harm's way. McVay requested a destroyer escort for Indianapolis, but his request was denied because the priority for destroyers at the time was escorting transports to Okinawa and picking up aircrew downed in B-29 raids on Japan.

Although many ships, including most destroyers, were equipped with submarine detection equipment, the Indianapolis was not. On July 24, 1945, just six days prior to the sinking of Indianapolis, the destroyer Underhill was attacked and sunk in the area by Japanese submarines, yet McVay was never informed of this event, and several others, in part due to issues of classified intelligence. McVay was warned of the potential presence of Japanese subs, but not of the actual confirmed activity.

Although about 380 ships of the U.S. Navy were lost in combat in World War II, McVay was the only captain to be court-martialed for the loss of his ship. It was speculated that he had been a fall guy for the Navy. The conviction effectively ended McVay's career as he lost seniority, although the sentence was overturned by Secretary James Forrestal owing to McVay's bravery prior to the sinking, and McVay was finally promoted to rear admiral when he retired from the navy in 1949, although he apparently never got over his treatment.

In his book Abandon Ship, author Richard F. Newcomb posits a motive for Admiral King's ordering McVay's court-martial. According to Captain McVay III's father, Admiral Charles B. McVay Jr., "'King never forgot a grudge". King had been a junior officer under the command of McVay's father when King and other officers snuck some women aboard a ship. Admiral McVay had a letter of reprimand placed in King's record for that. "Now," he raged, "King's used [my son] to get back at me."

== Suicide ==
On November 6, 1968, McVay took his own life by shooting himself at his home in Litchfield, Connecticut. He used a Colt pistol, an Officer's Model Target 38 Special. It was manufactured in 1906 and was not issued to the U.S. Navy despite what the name could lead some to believe, according to the USS Indianapolis Survivors Organization. This weapon has been referred to in some sources as McVay's service pistol, which it was not. Another myth regarding McVay's death, that he was holding in his hand a toy sailor he had received as a boy for a good luck charm, is also false. Police reports obtained by the Legacy Organization do not mention this nor show any other objects in the pictures aside from his pistol.

He was found on his back porch by his gardener. Though a note was not left, McVay was known by those close to him to have suffered from loneliness, particularly after losing his wife to cancer in 1961. McVay also struggled throughout his life from the impact of vitriolic letters and phone calls he periodically received from grief-stricken relatives of dead crewmen who served aboard Indianapolis.

== Exoneration ==
USS Indianapolis survivors organized, and many spent years attempting to clear their skipper's name. Many people, from McVay's sons Charles Butler McVay IV (1925–2012) and James "Kimo" Wilder McVay (1927–2001) to author Dan Kurzman, who chronicled the Indianapolis incident in Fatal Voyage, to members of Congress, long believed McVay was unfairly convicted. Paul Murphy, president of the USS Indianapolis Survivors Organization, said: "Captain McVay's court-martial was simply to divert attention from the terrible loss of life caused by procedural mistakes which never alerted anyone that we were missing."

Over fifty years after the incident, a 12-year-old student in Pensacola, Florida, Hunter Scott, was instrumental in raising awareness of the miscarriage of justice that occurred at the captain's court-martial. As part of a school project for the National History Day program, the young man interviewed nearly 150 survivors of the Indianapolis sinking and reviewed 800 documents. His testimony before the U.S. Congress brought national attention to the situation. Scott, who later became an officer in the US Navy, stated that of the more than forty survivors he heard back from early in his project, "all felt that their captain was court martialed unjustly."

In October 2000, the United States Congress passed a Sense of Congress resolution that McVay's record should reflect that "he is exonerated for the loss of the USS Indianapolis." President Bill Clinton also signed the resolution. Commander Mochitsura Hashimoto died five days before the exoneration (on October 25).

In May 2001, Secretary of the Navy Gordon R. England ordered Captain William Toti, former commanding officer of USS Indianapolis (SSN-697), to enter the Sense of Congress resolution into McVay's official Navy personnel record.

== Awards and decorations ==

| Silver Star | Bronze Star Medal | Purple Heart |
| Navy Unit Commendation | Navy Expeditionary Medal | World War I Victory Medal |
| China Service Medal | American Defense Service Medal w/ Fleet clasp | American Campaign Medal |
| European-African-Middle Eastern Campaign Medal w/ 3/16" bronze star | Asiatic-Pacific Campaign Medal w/ three 3/16" bronze stars | World War II Victory Medal |

== In popular culture ==
In 1978, the events surrounding McVay's court-martial were dramatized in The Failure to ZigZag by playwright John B. Ferzacca. McVay has been portrayed by Stacy Keach in the 1991 made-for-television movie Mission of the Shark: The Saga of the U.S.S. Indianapolis and Nicolas Cage in the 2016 film USS Indianapolis: Men of Courage. Also in 2016, USS Indianapolis: The Legacy was released. It is an in-depth film where the survivors tell the story of what happened and they speak about the aftermath of the tragic event. In 2019, PBS released a 90-minute documentary titled USS Indianapolis: The Final Chapter.

Captain McVay appears in the Jaws prequel novel "The Book of Quint" by Ryan Dacko.

== See also ==
- W. Graham Claytor Jr.
- List of U.S. Navy losses in World War II
- United States military veteran suicide
