= Charles McVay =

Charles McVay may refer to:

- Charles B. McVay Jr. (1868–1949), admiral in the U.S. Navy during World War I
- Charles B. McVay III (1898–1968), captain of the USS Indianapolis during World War II
