= Charles B. McVay Jr. =

United States Navy admiral (1868–1949)

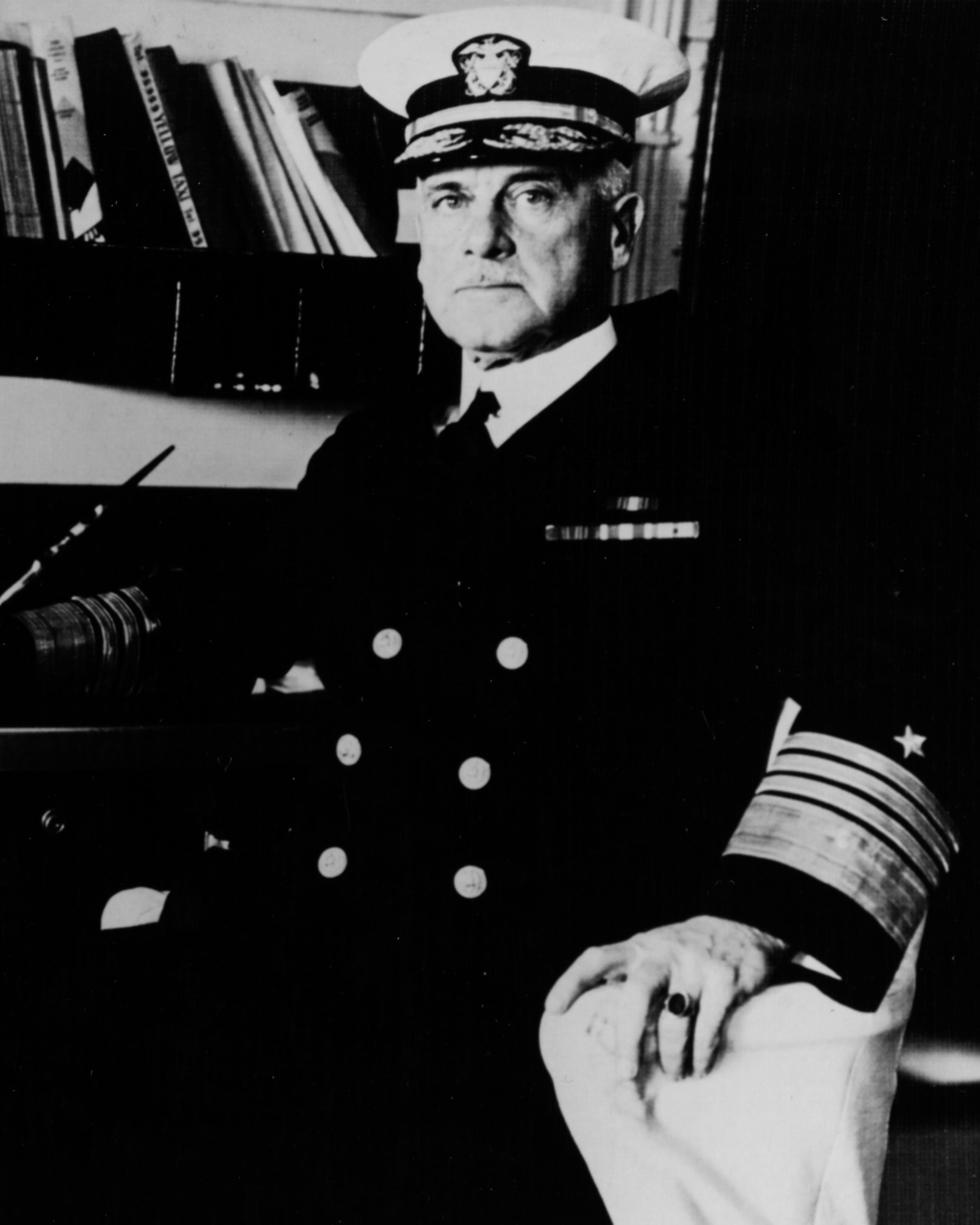
- Admiral McVay circa 1931
- Born: September 19, 1868; Edgeworth, Pennsylvania, U.S.
- Died: October 28, 1949 (aged 81); Bethesda, Maryland, U.S.
- Relatives: Charles B. McVay III (son)
- Military career
- Allegiance: United States of America
- Branch: United States Navy
- Service years: 1890–1932
- Rank: Admiral
- Commands: United States Asiatic Fleet
- Conflicts: Spanish–American War; World War I

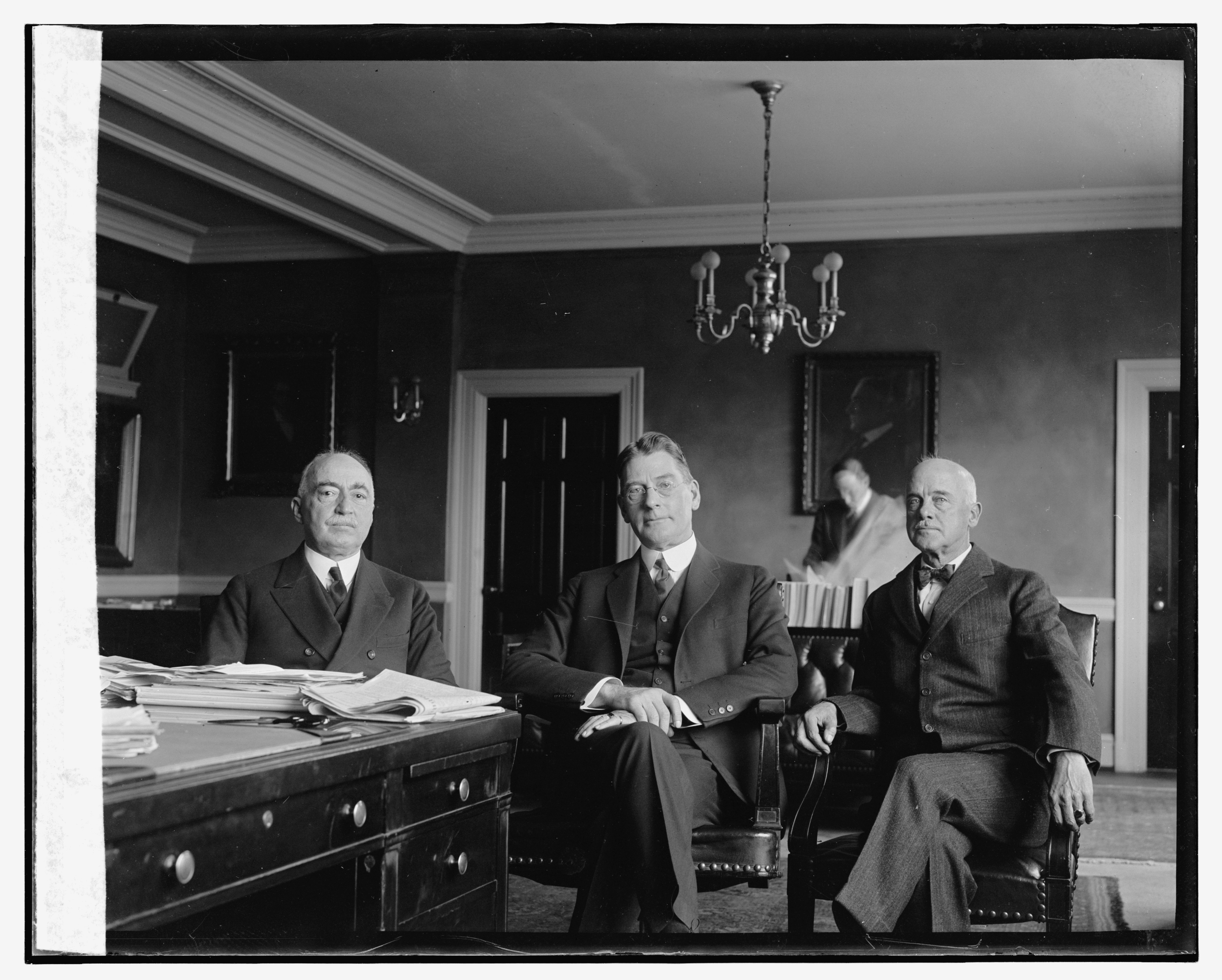
McVay (right) in 1924

Charles Butler McVay Jr. (September 19, 1868 – October 28, 1949) was an admiral in the United States Navy after World War I. In 1907–1909, after the round-the-world cruise of the Great White Fleet, he commanded the tender USS Yankton. He then held various assignments of increasing importance throughout and after World War I. In the early 1930s, he served as commander-in-chief of the Asiatic Fleet.

== Personal life ==
McVay was born on September 19, 1868, in Edgeworth, Pennsylvania. He was an 1890 graduate of the United States Naval Academy. His son Charles B. McVay III was the commanding officer of the ill-fated USS Indianapolis.

== Military career ==
During the Spanish–American War (1898), Ensign McVay served aboard the USS Amphitrite (BM-2), a double-turret monitor. It patrolled the waters off Cuba, Puerto Rico, and Key West and participated in the shelling of San Juan in May 1898.

In 1908, after serving as a navigator aboard USS Hartford and USS Alabama and a tour at the US Naval Academy, McVay was given command of USS Yankton. In 1909, McVay was stationed at Norfolk, Virginia, as the Yankton had just returned from an around-the-world cruise with the Great White Fleet.

== World War I service ==
During World War I, McVay served as commanding officer aboard three vessels: USS Saratoga, USS New Jersey, and USS Oklahoma.

== Asiatic Fleet Command ==
After the war, McVay served as a commander in the Yangtze Patrol. At this time, the United States, along with Japan and the major European nations, had garrisons in Shanghai, Beijing, and Tianjin. U.S. Navy gunboats regularly patrolled the Yangtze River to protect foreigners during a turbulent period when China had no effective central government. In 1929, McVay was promoted to admiral and commanded the United States Asiatic Fleet. He retired from the Navy in October 1932 and died on October 28, 1949. McVay is buried in Arlington National Cemetery.

Military offices
Preceded by Mark L. Bristol	Commander-in-Chief, United States Asiatic Fleet; 9 September 1929 – 1 September 1931	Succeeded by Montgomery M. Taylor
