= Letter of reprimand =

U.S. military procedure

A letter of reprimand is a US Department of Defense procedure involving a letter to an employee or service member from their superior that details the wrongful actions of the person and the punishment that can be expected. A Formal Letter of Reprimand is one in which a copy of the letter is kept in the personal service record of the individual.

In military contexts, a formal letter of reprimand can be career-ending, even without prescribed punishments, because it makes it difficult to secure advancements in rank or to enjoy the respect of one's peers.

In legal contexts, a letter of reprimand is sometimes called a letter of admonition. It is the lowest form of attorney discipline under the Code of Professional Responsibility.

The United States Manual for Court Martial, R.C.M. 306(c)(2), states:

Administrative action. A commander may take or initiate administrative action, in addition to or instead of other action [e.g., non-judicial punishment (Article 15 or "NJP") and court-martial] taken under this rule, subject to regulations of the Secretary concerned. Administrative actions include corrective measures such as counseling, admonition, reprimand, exhortation, disapproval, criticism, censure, reproach, rebuke, extra military instruction, or the administrative withholding of privileges, or any combination of the above.

The order of severity for formal written administrative action is:

- a letter of counsel (least severe)
- a memorandum of concern
- a letter of admonishment
- a letter of reprimand.

A letter of reprimand may be issued in lieu of punishment under Article 15 of the Uniform Code of Military Justice. A formal letter of reprimand is placed in the service member's permanent personnel record. In the US Navy, a letter of reprimand can only be given as a result of non-judicial punishment or a court-martial conviction.

== Examples ==
In July 1945, after delivering the Little Boy atomic bomb to Tinian, the USS Indianapolis was torpedoed in the Philippine Sea. When the ship was sunk, most of the crew were stranded at sea for 5 days where they staved off shark attacks and dehydration. In the aftermath of the disaster, some US naval officers in Leyte, Philippines, were given letters of reprimand, because they failed to note that the ship was missing. The Indianapolis commander, Charles B. McVay III, was also given a letter of reprimand before being court-martialed and eventually exonerated, but not before he committed suicide.

Air National Guard Major Harry Schmidt was reprimanded for the Tarnak Farm incident, in which on April 17, 2002, he dropped a 500-pound bomb on Canadian soldiers near Kandahar, Afghanistan, killing four and injuring eight others.

On September 25, 2008, the Department of Defense announced that six US Air Force and two US Army generals and nine colonels had received letters of reprimand, admonishment, or concern because of the mishandling of fuses for nuclear weapons, which were mistakenly shipped to Taiwan. Air Force Chief of Staff Norton Schwartz met with each officer personally before issuing the letters. He noted they committed no offense under the UCMJ but "did not do enough to carry out their leadership responsibilities for nuclear oversight. For that they must be held accountable."
