= Harold Bray (sailor) =

American sailor and police officer (born 1927)

- Born: June 15, 1927 (age 99); Michigan, U.S.
- Military career
- Allegiance: United States
- Branch: Navy
- Service years: 1944-?
- Rank: Sailor

Harold Bray (born June 15, 1927) is an American former U.S. Navy sailor and police officer. He is most known for being the last living survivor of the sinking of the USS Indianapolis (CA-35) during World War II.

== Early life ==
Bray was born in northern Michigan on June 15, 1927. He joined the ROTC as a teenager and became his squadron leader while awaiting the chance to enlist.

== Military service ==
At age 17 in 1944, Bray enlisted in the United States Navy and attended boot camp at Great Lakes, Illinois. He was later assigned to the Indianapolis at Mare Island Naval Shipyard in California, where the ship was undergoing repairs after a Kamikaze attack at Okinawa in March 1945 that killed nine crew members.

During the summer of 1945, while the ship was refitting, Bray trained in firefighting, watch-standing, and other naval duties, living in barracks and commuting by train to the ship each day. On July 30, 1945, after completing a top-secret mission to deliver atomic bomb components to Tinian, the Indianapolis was sunk by a Japanese submarine. Bray survived the sinking and was rescued after several days in a raft boat.

== Later life ==
After his Navy service, Bray settled in Benicia, California, where he raised a family and worked for the Benicia Police Department. He became a well-regarded member of the local community and has remained active in civic life.

== Legacy ==
Bray is recognized as the last living survivor of the sinking of the Indianapolis. He has been honored at memorial events and continues to share his story to preserve the memory of his shipmates.
