= Submarine Squadron 3 =

Submarine Squadron Three
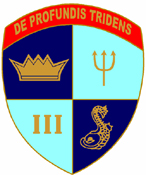
- Active: 25 November 1930–February 2, 2012; 2026-onwards
- Country: United States of America
- Branch: United States Navy
- Part of: Commander, Submarine Force, U.S. Pacific Fleet
- Garrison/HQ: Joint Base Pearl Harbor–Hickam

Submarine Squadron 3 (also known as SUBRON 3) was a squadron of submarines of the United States Navy based at Joint Base Pearl Harbor–Hickam, Pearl Harbor, HI which was disestablished in 2012.

The squadron was reactivated at Fremantle, Australia, in mid-2026.

Submarine Squadron 3 was first established on November 25, 1930, at Coco Solo in the Panama Canal Zone. One of its first submarines was the R-1 built in 1917. Her ten boats conducted Panama Sea Frontier patrols for the Atlantic Fleet. As tensions grew through the 1930s, Squadron Three's mission evolved into the defense of coastal regions on both ends of the canal. Most of Squadron Three's submarines shifted to the Pacific end of the canal when war broke out.

As the Second World War progressed, most of the squadron's submarines were transferred to more active regions, leaving only four subs in Squadron Three by August 1943. By May 1945, there were no submarines left in the squadron; only the rescue vessel USS Mallard (AM-44) and three destroyers remained.

Squadron Three was deactivated July 1, 1945 and reactivated in Guam on October 1, 1945. The United States built a fleet of diesel-electric submarines during the war and commissioned a new submarine tender, USS Sperry (AS-12), near its end. To support these ships, the Navy reorganized its submarine squadrons, re-establishing COMSUBRON 3 on Guam on Octobrt. 1, 1945.

In February, 1946 the squadron moved to San Diego. Submarine Squadron Three continued to serve until March 31, 1995, when it was again deactivated. On June 16, 1997, Submarine Squadron Three rejoined the Pacific Submarine Force in Pearl Harbor, Hawaii with seven submarines assigned: USS Asheville (SSN-758), USS Columbia (SSN-771), USS Louisville (SSN-724), USS Key West (SSN-722), USS Olympia (SSN-717), USS Chicago (SSN-721), and USS Honolulu (SSN-718).

In 2003, five submarines from COMSUBRON 3 were deployed in support of Operation Iraqi Freedom. Three of these submarines, USS Columbia (SSN-771), USS Louisville (SSN-724) and USS Key West (SSN-722), conducted Tomahawk strike operations against targets in Iraq.

On February 2, 2012, Commander, Submarine Squadron (COMSUBRON) 3 disestablished, as COMSUBRON 1 changed command, during an official ceremony aboard USS Greeneville (SSN 772) at the submarine piers at Joint Base Pearl Harbor–Hickam. The disestablishment reassigned all COMSUBRON 3 attack submarines to COMSUBRON 1 and COMSUBRON 7. Under the deactivation, USS Jacksonville (SSN-699), USS Key West (SSN-722) and USS North Carolina (SSN-777) were assigned to COMSUBRON 1 and USS Louisville (SSN-724) and USS Olympia (SSN-717) were assigned to COMSUBRON 7. USS Chicago (SSN-721) was assigned to COMSUBRON 15 in Apra Harbor, Guam.

The squadron was reactivated at Fremantle, Australia, in June 2026.

== See also ==
- History of the United States Navy
