= USS Indianapolis (CA-35) =

Portland-class heavy cruiser of the United States Navy

Coordinates: 12°2′N 134°48′E

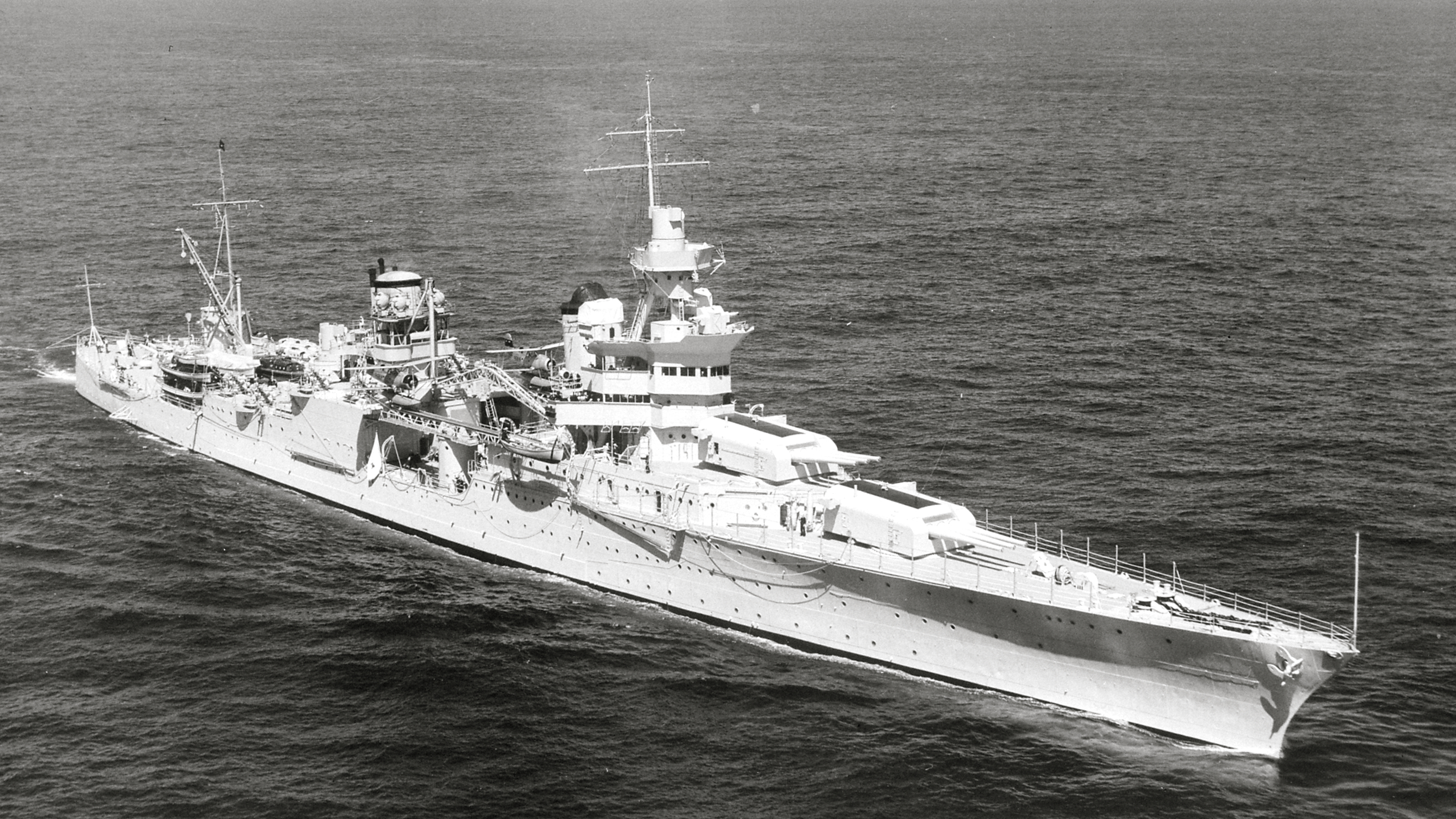
- USS Indianapolis, 27 September 1939

History

United States
- Name: Indianapolis
- Namesake: City of Indianapolis, Indiana
- Ordered: 13 February 1929
- Awarded: 15 August 1929
- Builder: New York Shipbuilding Corporation, Camden, New Jersey
- Cost: $10,903,200 (contract price)
- Laid down: 31 March 1930
- Launched: 7 November 1931
- Sponsored by: Lucy M. Taggart
- Commissioned: 15 November 1932
- Identification: Hull symbol: CL-35; Hull symbol: CA-35; Code letters: NABD
- Nickname(s): "Indy"
- Honors and awards: 10 × battle stars
- Fate: Torpedoed and sunk by Japanese submarine I-58 on 30 July 1945

General characteristics (as built)
- Class & type: Portland-class cruiser
- Displacement: 9,950 long tons (10,110 t) (standard)
- Length: 610 ft 3 in (186.00 m) loa; 584 ft (178 m) lwl
- Beam: 66 ft 1 in (20.14 m)
- Draft: 17 ft 4 in (5.28 m) (mean); 24 ft (7.3 m) (max)
- Installed power: 8 × White-Forster boilers; 107,000 shp (80,000 kW)
- Propulsion: 4 × Parsons reduction steam turbines; 4 × screws
- Speed: 32.7 kn (60.6 km/h; 37.6 mph)
- Range: 13,000 nmi (15,000 mi; 24,000 km) at 15 kn (17 mph; 28 km/h)
- Complement: 95 officers 857 enlisted (as designed); 1,269 officers and men (wartime); 1,195 crewmen at time of sinking
- Armament: 9 × 8-inch (203mm)/55-caliber guns (3x3); 8 × 5-inch (127mm)/25-caliber anti-aircraft guns; 2 × 3-pounder 47 mm (1.9 in) saluting guns
- Armor: Belt: 3 1/4–5 in (83–127 mm); Deck: 2 1/2 in (64 mm); Barbettes: 1 1/2 in (38 mm); Turrets: 1 1/2–2 1/2 in (38–64 mm); Conning tower: 1 1/4 in (32 mm)
- Aircraft carried: 4 × floatplanes
- Aviation facilities: 2 × Amidship catapults

General characteristics (1945)
- Armament: 9 × 8 in (203 mm)/55 caliber guns (3x3); 8 × 5 in (127 mm)/25 caliber anti-aircraft guns; 2 × 3-pounder saluting guns; 6 × quad 40 mm (1.57 in) Bofors anti-aircraft guns; 19 × single 20 mm (0.79 in) Oerlikon anti-aircraft cannons
- Aircraft carried: 3 × floatplanes
- Aviation facilities: 1 × Amidship catapults (starboard catapult removed in 1945)

USS Indianapolis (CL/CA-35) was a Portland-class heavy cruiser of the United States Navy, named for the city of Indianapolis, Indiana. Launched in 1931, she was the flagship of the commander of Scouting Force 1 for eight years, then flagship for Admiral Raymond Spruance from 1943 to 1945 while he commanded the Fifth Fleet in battles across the Central Pacific during World War II.

In July 1945, Indianapolis completed a top-secret high-speed trip to deliver uranium and other components for "Little Boy", the first nuclear weapon used in combat, to the Tinian Naval Base, and subsequently departed for the Philippines on training duty. At 0015 on 30 July, the ship was torpedoed by the Imperial Japanese Navy submarine I-58, and sank in 12 minutes.

Of 1,195 crewmen aboard, about 300 went down with the ship. The remaining 890 faced exposure, dehydration, saltwater poisoning, and shark attacks while stranded in the open ocean, with few lifeboats and almost no food or water.

The Navy learned of the sinking four days later, when survivors were spotted by the crew of a PV-1 Ventura on routine patrol. A U.S. Navy PBY flying boat crew landed to save those in the water. Only 316 survived. No U.S. warship sunk at sea has lost more sailors. (Note: While the loss of Indianapolis is the worst-ever loss of life from a single ship sinking at sea for the U.S. Navy, it is not the worst naval disaster for the U.S. Navy nor the United States military as a whole. Earlier in World War II, the battleship USS Arizona and the troopship HMT Rohna were lost with more American lives, but Arizona was in port at Pearl Harbor when sunk and Rohna was primarily carrying United States Army personnel, not U.S. Navy personnel, when it was sunk at sea. The complement of the aircraft carrier USS Franklin would also suffer upwards of 900 killed at sea throughout the war, although Franklin was not sunk. Additionally, the accidental loss of the steamboat Sultana, which exploded on the Mississippi River while carrying Union soldiers in the immediate aftermath of the American Civil War, was the worst maritime disaster in U.S. history. The 1,700 U.S. military prisoners of war from the Philippines (out of a total of 1,773 Allied troops missing and killed) who died on the sunken Japanese hell ship Arisan Maru from a torpedo launched by the submarine USS Shark was the greatest loss of life from a single ship in U.S. military history.)

On 19 August 2017, a search team financed by Microsoft co-founder Paul Allen located the wreckage in the Philippine Sea at a depth of about 18,000 ft (5,500 m). On 20 December 2018, the crew of Indianapolis was collectively awarded a Congressional Gold Medal.

== Construction ==
Indianapolis was the second of two ships in the Portland class, the third class of "treaty cruisers" constructed by the United States Navy following the Washington Naval Treaty of 1922, after the two vessels of the Pensacola class, ordered in 1926, and the six of the Northampton class, ordered in 1927. Ordered for the U.S. Navy in fiscal year 1930, Indianapolis was originally designated as a light cruiser because of her thin armor and given the hull classification symbol CL-35. She was reclassified a heavy cruiser, because of her 8-inch (203 mm) guns, with the symbol CA-35 on 1 July 1931, in accordance with the London Naval Treaty.

The Portland-class cruisers were designed for a standard displacement of 10,258 long tons (10,423 t), and a full-load displacement of 12,755 long tons (12,960 t). But Indianapolis did not reach this weight, displacing 9,950 long tons (10,110 t). The ship had two distinctive raked funnels, a tripod foremast, and a small tower and pole mast aft. In 1943, light tripods were added forward of the second funnel on each ship, and a prominent naval director was installed aft.

The ship had four propeller shafts and four Parsons GT geared turbines and eight White-Forster boilers. The 107,000 shp (80,000 kW) gave a design speed of 32.7 kn (60.6 km/h; 37.6 mph). She was designed for a range of 10,000 nmi (19,000 km; 12,000 mi) at 15 kn (28 km/h; 17 mph). She rolled badly until fitted with a bilge keel.

The cruiser had nine 8-inch/55-caliber Mark 9 guns in three triple mounts, a superfiring pair fore and one aft. For anti-aircraft defense, she had eight 5-inch/25-caliber guns and two QF 3-pounder Hotchkiss guns. In 1945, she received twenty-four 40 mm (1.57 in) Bofors guns, arrayed in six quad mounts. Both ships were upgraded with nineteen 20 mm (0.79 in) Oerlikon cannons. The ship did not have torpedo tubes.

The Portland-class cruisers originally had 1-inch (25 mm) armor for deck and side protection, but in construction they were given belt armor between 3.25 in (83 mm) and 5 in (130 mm) (around the magazines) in thickness. Armor on the bulkheads was between 2 in (51 mm) and 5.75 in (146 mm); that on the deck was 2.5 in (64 mm), the barbettes 1.5 in (38 mm), the gun turrets 2.5 in, and the conning tower 1.25 in (32 mm).

Portland-class cruisers were outfitted as fleet flagships, with space for a flag officer and his staff. The class also had two aircraft catapults amidships. They could carry four aircraft. The total crew varied, with a regular designed complement of 807 and a wartime complement of 952, which could increase to 1,229 when the cruiser was a fleet flagship.

Indianapolis was laid down by New York Shipbuilding Corporation on 31 March 1930. The hull and machinery were provided by the builder. Indianapolis was launched on 7 November 1931, and commissioned on 15 November 1932. She was the second ship named for the city of Indianapolis, following the cargo ship of the same name in 1918. She was sponsored by Lucy M. Taggart, daughter of former Mayor of Indianapolis Thomas Taggart.

== Interwar period ==
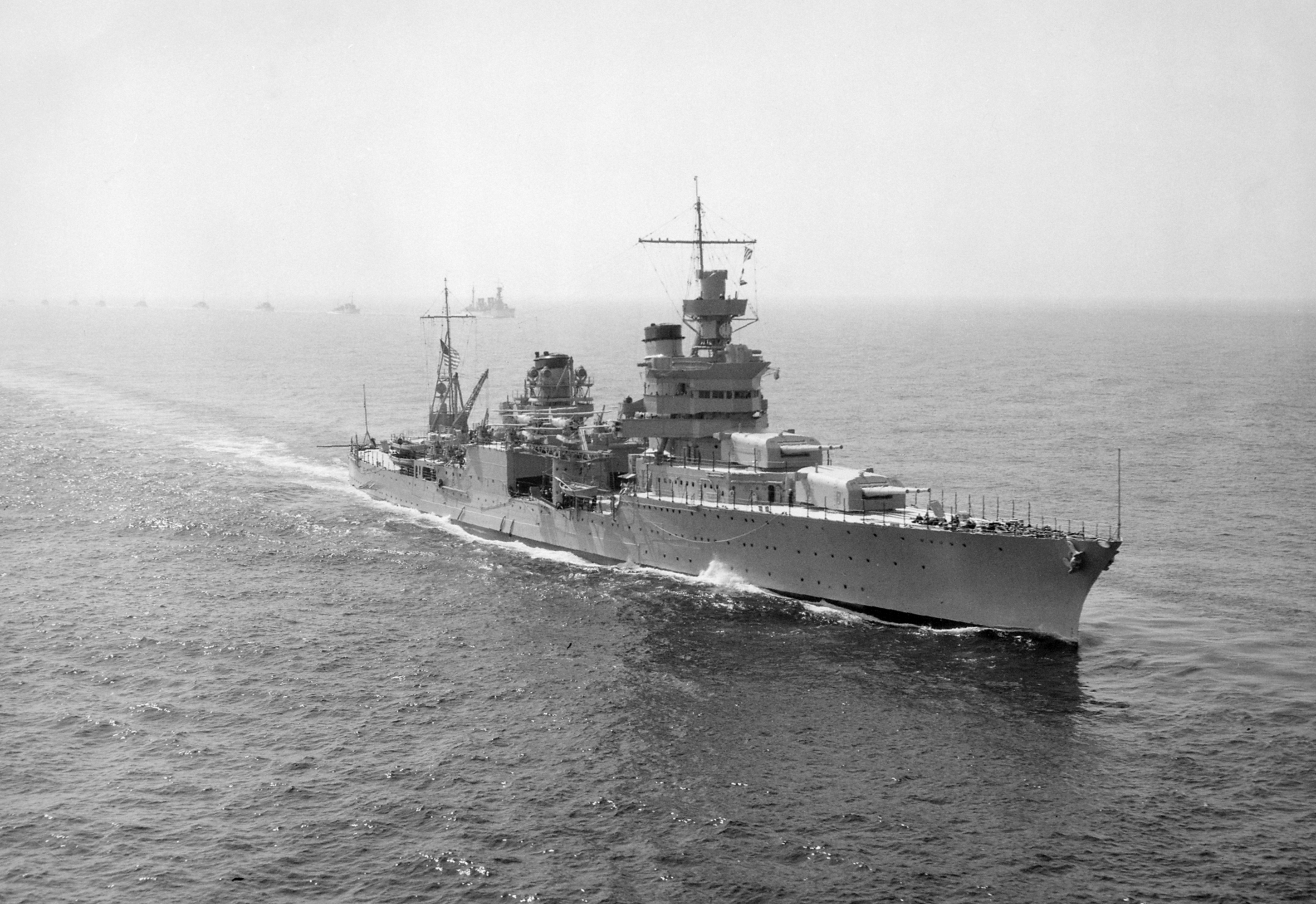
Indianapolis in 1939

Under Captain John M. Smeallie, Indianapolis undertook her shakedown cruise through the Atlantic and into Guantánamo Bay, until 23 February 1932. Indianapolis then transited the Panama Canal for training off the Chilean coast. After overhaul at the Philadelphia Naval Shipyard, she sailed to Maine to embark President Franklin D. Roosevelt at Campobello Island, New Brunswick, on 1 July 1933. Getting underway the same day, Indianapolis arrived at Annapolis, Maryland, on 3 July. She hosted six members of the Cabinet, along with Roosevelt, during her stay there. After disembarking Roosevelt, she departed Annapolis on 4 July, and steamed for Philadelphia Navy Yard.

On 6 September, she embarked United States Secretary of the Navy Claude A. Swanson, for an inspection of the Navy in the Pacific. Indianapolis toured the Canal Zone, Hawaii, and installations in San Pedro and San Diego. Swanson disembarked on 27 October. On 1 November 1933, she became the flagship of Scouting Fleet 1, and maneuvered with the force off Long Beach, California. She departed on 9 April 1934, and arrived at New York City, embarking Roosevelt for a second time, for a naval review. She returned to Long Beach on 9 November 1934 for more training with the Scouting Force. She remained flagship of Scouting Force 1 until 1941. On 18 November 1936, she embarked Roosevelt for a third time at Charleston, South Carolina, and conducted a goodwill cruise to South America with him. She visited Rio de Janeiro, Brazil, Buenos Aires, Argentina, and Montevideo, Uruguay, for state visits before returning to Charleston and disembarking Roosevelt's party on 15 December. President Roosevelt underwent his crossing the line ceremony during this cruise on 26 November: an "intensive initiation lasting two days, but we have all survived and are now full-fledged Shellbacks".

== World War II ==
On 7 December 1941, Indianapolis, leading Task Force 3, (Indianapolis and destroyer-minesweepers Dorsey, Elliot, and Lamberton from MineDiv 6, and Southard and Long from MineDiv 5) was conducting a mock bombardment at Johnston Atoll during the Japanese attack on Pearl Harbor. Indianapolis was absorbed into Task Force 12 and searched for the Japanese aircraft carriers responsible for the attack, though the force did not locate them. She returned to Pearl Harbor on 13 December and joined Task Force 11.

=== New Guinea campaign ===
With the task force, she steamed to the South Pacific, to 350 mi (560 km) south of Rabaul, New Britain, escorting the aircraft carrier Lexington. Late in the afternoon of 20 February 1942, the American ships were attacked by 18 Japanese aircraft. Of these, 16 were shot down by aircraft from Lexington and the other two were destroyed by anti-aircraft fire from the ships.

On 10 March, the task force, reinforced by another force centered on the carrier Yorktown, attacked Lae and Salamaua, New Guinea, where the Japanese were marshaling amphibious forces. Attacking from the south through the Owen Stanley mountain range, the US air forces surprised and inflicted heavy damage on Japanese warships and transports, losing few aircraft. Indianapolis returned to the Mare Island Naval Shipyard for a refit before escorting a convoy to Australia.

=== Aleutian Islands campaign ===
Indianapolis then headed for the North Pacific to support American units in the Battle of the Aleutian Islands. On 7 August, Indianapolis and the task force attacked Kiska Island, a Japanese staging area. Although fog hindered observation, Indianapolis and other ships fired their main guns into the bay. Floatplanes from the cruisers reported Japanese ships sunk in the harbor and damage to shore installations. After 15 minutes, Japanese shore batteries returned fire before being destroyed by the ships' main guns. Japanese submarines approaching the force were depth-charged by American destroyers and Japanese seaplanes made an ineffective bombing attack. In spite of a lack of information on the Japanese forces, the operation was considered a success. US forces later occupied Adak Island, providing a naval base farther from Dutch Harbor on Unalaska Island.

=== 1943 operations ===
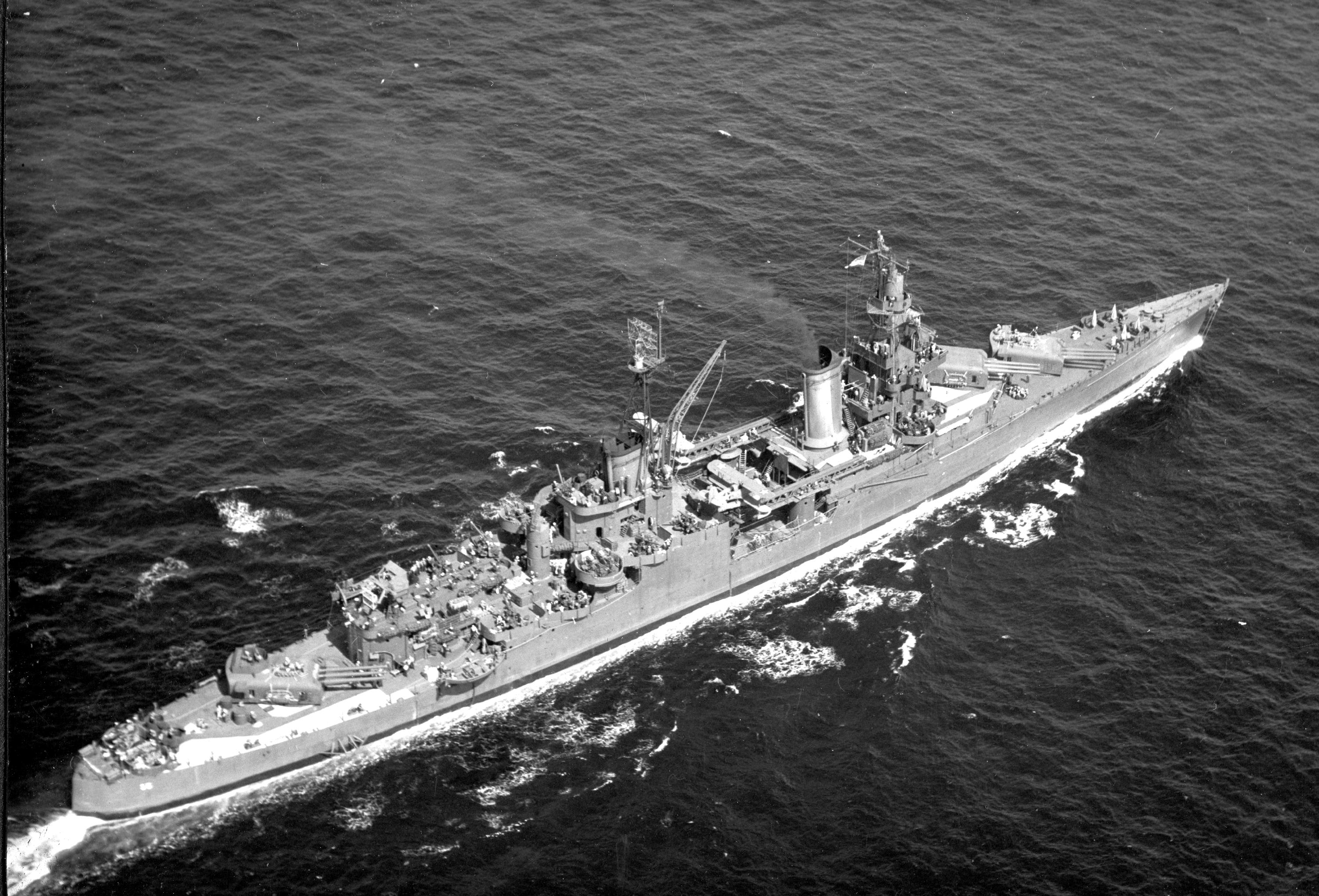
Indianapolis underway at sea in 1943–1944

In January 1943, Indianapolis supported a landing and occupation on Amchitka, part of an Allied island hopping strategy in the Aleutian Islands.

On the evening of 19 February, Indianapolis led two destroyers on a patrol southwest of Attu Island, searching for Japanese ships trying to reinforce Kiska and Attu. She intercepted the Japanese 3,100-long-ton (3,150 t) cargo ship, Akagane Maru laden with troops, munitions, and supplies. The cargo ship tried to reply to the radio challenge but was shelled by Indianapolis. Akagane Maru exploded and sank with all hands. Through mid-1943, Indianapolis remained near the Aleutian Islands, escorting American convoys and providing shore bombardments supporting amphibious assaults. In May, the Allies captured Attu, then turned on Kiska, thought to be the final Japanese holdout in the Aleutians. Allied landings there began on 15 August, but the Japanese had already abandoned the Aleutian Islands, unbeknownst to the Allies.

After refitting at Mare Island, Indianapolis moved to Hawaii as flagship of Vice Admiral Raymond A. Spruance, commanding the 5th Fleet. She sortied from Pearl Harbor on 10 November, with the main body of the Southern Attack Force for Operation Galvanic, the invasion of the Gilbert Islands. On 19 November, Indianapolis bombarded Tarawa Atoll, and next day pounded Makin (see Battle of Makin). The ship then returned to Tarawa as fire-support for the landings. Her guns shot down an enemy plane and shelled enemy strongpoints as landing parties fought Japanese defenders in the Battle of Tarawa. She continued this role until the island was secure three days later. The conquest of the Marshall Islands followed victory in the Gilberts. Indianapolis was again 5th Fleet flagship.

=== 1944 ===
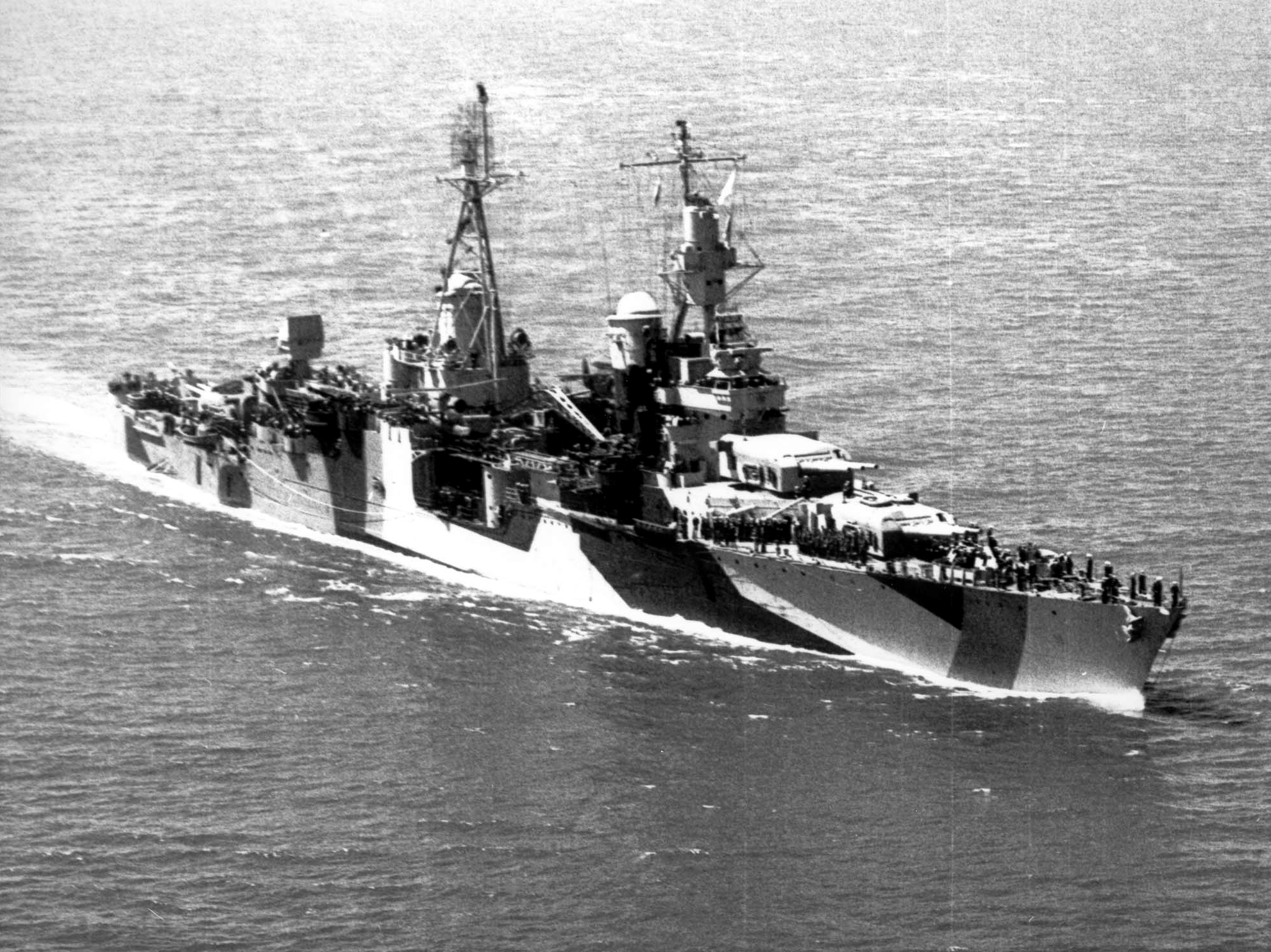
Indianapolis in 1944 dazzle camouflage pattern

The cruiser met other ships of her task force at Tarawa, and on D-Day minus 1, 31 January 1944, she was one of the cruisers that bombarded the islands of Kwajalein Atoll. The shelling continued on D-Day, with Indianapolis suppressing two enemy shore batteries. Next day, she destroyed a blockhouse and other shore installations and supported advancing troops with a creeping barrage. The ship entered Kwajalein Lagoon, on 4 February, and remained until resistance disappeared (see Battle of Kwajalein).

In March and April, Indianapolis, still flagship of the 5th Fleet, attacked the Western Carolines. Carrier planes at the Palau Islands on 30–31 March, sank three destroyers, 17 freighters, five oilers and damaged 17 other ships. Airfields were bombed and surrounding water mined. Yap and Ulithi were struck on 31 March, and Woleai on 1 April. Japanese planes attacked but were driven off without damaging the American ships. Indianapolis shot down her second plane, a torpedo bomber, and the Japanese lost 160 planes, including 46 on the ground. These attacks prevented Japanese forces stationed in the Carolines from interfering with the US landings on New Guinea.

In June, the 5th Fleet was busy with the assault on the Mariana Islands. Raids on Saipan began with carrier-based planes on 11 June, followed by surface bombardment, in which Indianapolis had a major role, from 13 June (see Battle of Saipan). On D-Day, 15 June, Admiral Spruance heard that battleships, carriers, cruisers, and destroyers were headed south to relieve threatened garrisons in the Marianas. Since amphibious operations at Saipan had to be protected, Spruance could not withdraw too far. Consequently, a fast carrier force was sent to meet this threat while another force attacked Japanese air bases on Iwo Jima and Chichi Jima, in the Bonin and Volcano Islands, bases for potential enemy air attacks.

A combined US fleet fought the Japanese on 19 June in the Battle of the Philippine Sea. Japanese carrier planes, which planned to use the airfields of Guam and Tinian to refuel and rearm, were met by carrier planes and the guns of the Allied escorting ships. That day, the U.S. Navy destroyed a reported 426 Japanese planes while losing 29. Indianapolis shot down one torpedo plane. This day of aerial combat became known as the "Great Marianas Turkey Shoot". With Japanese air opposition wiped out, the US carrier planes sank Hiyō, two destroyers, and one tanker and damaged others. Two other carriers, Taihō and Shōkaku, were sunk by submarines.

Indianapolis returned to Saipan on 23 June to resume fire support and six days later moved to Tinian to attack shore installations (see Battle of Tinian). Meanwhile, Guam had been taken, and Indianapolis became the first ship to enter Apra Harbor since early in the war. The ship operated in the Marianas for the next few weeks, then moved to the Western Carolines, where further landings were planned. From 12 to 29 September, she bombarded Peleliu, in the Palau Group, before and after the landings (see Battle of Peleliu). She then sailed to Manus Island, in the Admiralty Islands, where she operated for 10 days before returning to the Mare Island Naval Shipyard in California for refitting.

=== 1945 ===
Overhauled, Indianapolis joined Vice Admiral Marc A. Mitscher's fast carrier task force on 14 February 1945. Two days later, the task force launched an attack on Tokyo to cover the landings on Iwo Jima, scheduled for 19 February. This was the first carrier attack on mainland Japan since the Doolittle Raid. The mission was to destroy Japanese air facilities and other installations in the Home Islands. The fleet achieved complete tactical surprise by approaching the Japanese coast under cover of bad weather. The attacks were pressed home for two days. The U.S. Navy lost 49 carrier planes while claiming 499 enemy planes, a 10-to-1 kill/loss ratio. The task force also sank a carrier, nine coastal ships, a destroyer, two destroyer escorts, and a cargo ship. They destroyed hangars, shops, aircraft installations, factories, and other industrial targets.

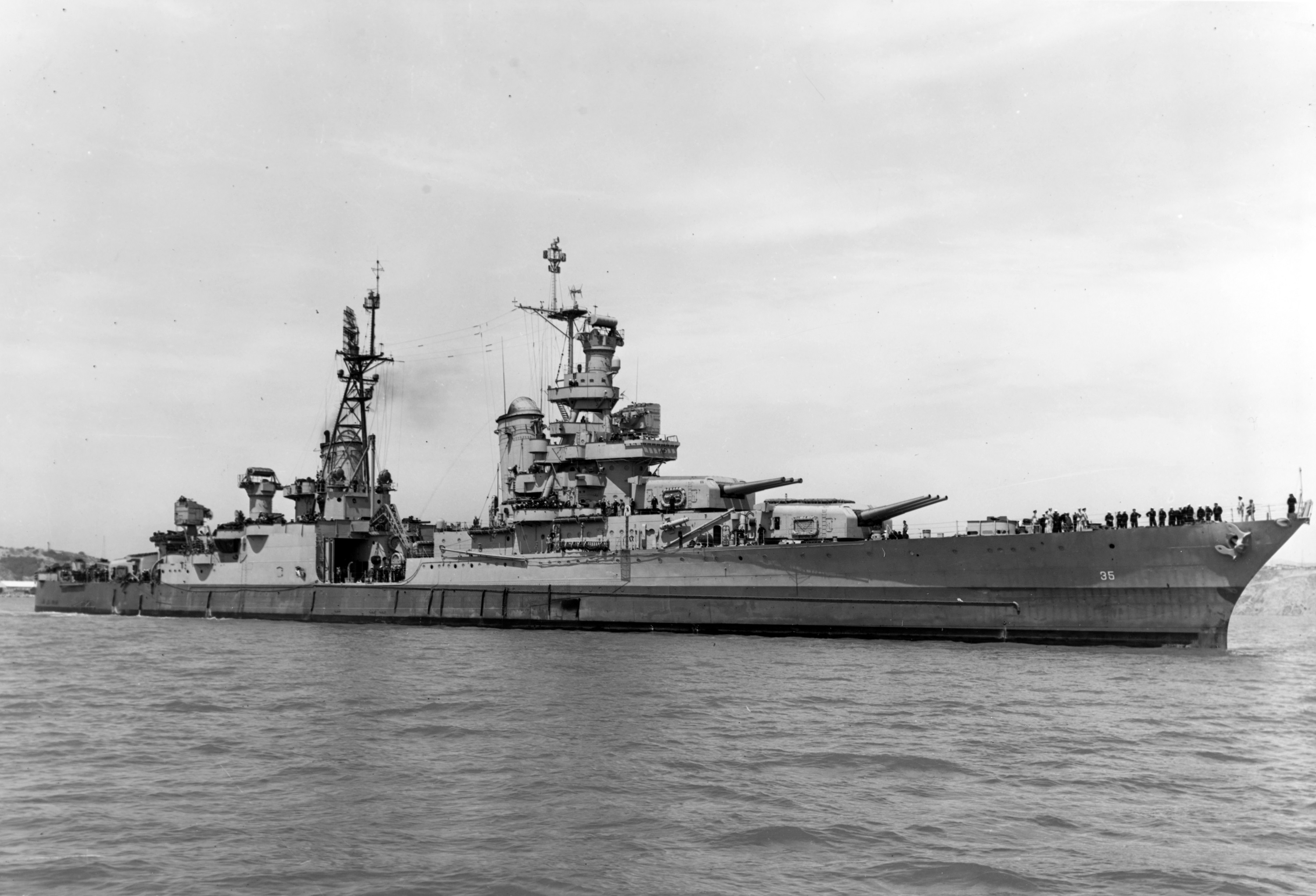
Indianapolis off Mare Island on 10 July 1945

Immediately after the strikes, the task force raced to the Bonin Islands to support the landings on Iwo Jima. The ship remained there until 1 March, protecting the invasion ships and bombarding targets in support of the landings. Indianapolis returned to VADM Mitscher's task force in time to strike Tokyo, again on 25 February, and Hachijō, off the southern coast of Honshū, the following day. Although weather was extremely bad, the American force destroyed 158 planes and sank five small ships while pounding ground installations and destroying trains.

The next target for the US forces was Okinawa, in the Ryukyu Islands, which were in range of aircraft from the Japanese mainland. The fast carrier force was tasked with attacking airfields in southern Japan until they were incapable of launching effective airborne opposition to the impending invasion. The fast carrier force departed for Japan from Ulithi on 14 March. On 18 March, she launched an attack from a position 100 mi (160 km) southeast of the island of Kyūshū. The attack targeted airfields on Kyūshū, as well as ships of the Japanese fleet in the harbors of Kobe and Kure, on southern Honshū. The Japanese located the American task force on 21 March, sending 48 planes to attack the ships. Twenty-four fighters from the task force intercepted and shot down all the Japanese aircraft.

Indianapolis was assigned to Task Force 54 (TF 54) for the invasion of Okinawa. When TF 54 began pre-invasion bombardment of Okinawa on 24 March, Indianapolis spent seven days pouring 8-inch shells into the beach defenses. During this time, enemy aircraft repeatedly attacked the American ships. Indianapolis shot down six planes and damaged two others. On 31 March, the day before the Tenth Army (combined U.S. Army and U.S. Marine Corps) started its assault landings, the Indianapolis lookouts spotted a Japanese Nakajima Ki-43 "Oscar" fighter as it emerged from the morning twilight and dived vertically towards the bridge. The ship's 20 mm guns opened fire, but within 15 seconds the plane was over the ship. Tracers converged on it, causing it to swerve, but the pilot managed to release his bomb from a height of 25 ft (7.6 m), then crashed his plane into the sea near the port stern. The bomb plummeted through the deck, into the crew's mess hall, down through the berthing compartment, and through the fuel tanks before crashing through the keel and exploding in the water underneath. The concussion blew two gaping holes in the keel which flooded nearby compartments, killing nine crewmen. The ship's bulkheads prevented any progressive flooding. Indianapolis, settling slightly by the stern and listing to port, steamed to a salvage ship for emergency repairs. Here, inspection revealed that her propeller shafts were damaged, her fuel tanks ruptured, and her water-distilling equipment ruined. Indianapolis then steamed under her own power to the Mare Island Naval Shipyard for repairs.

=== Transporting the atomic bomb ===
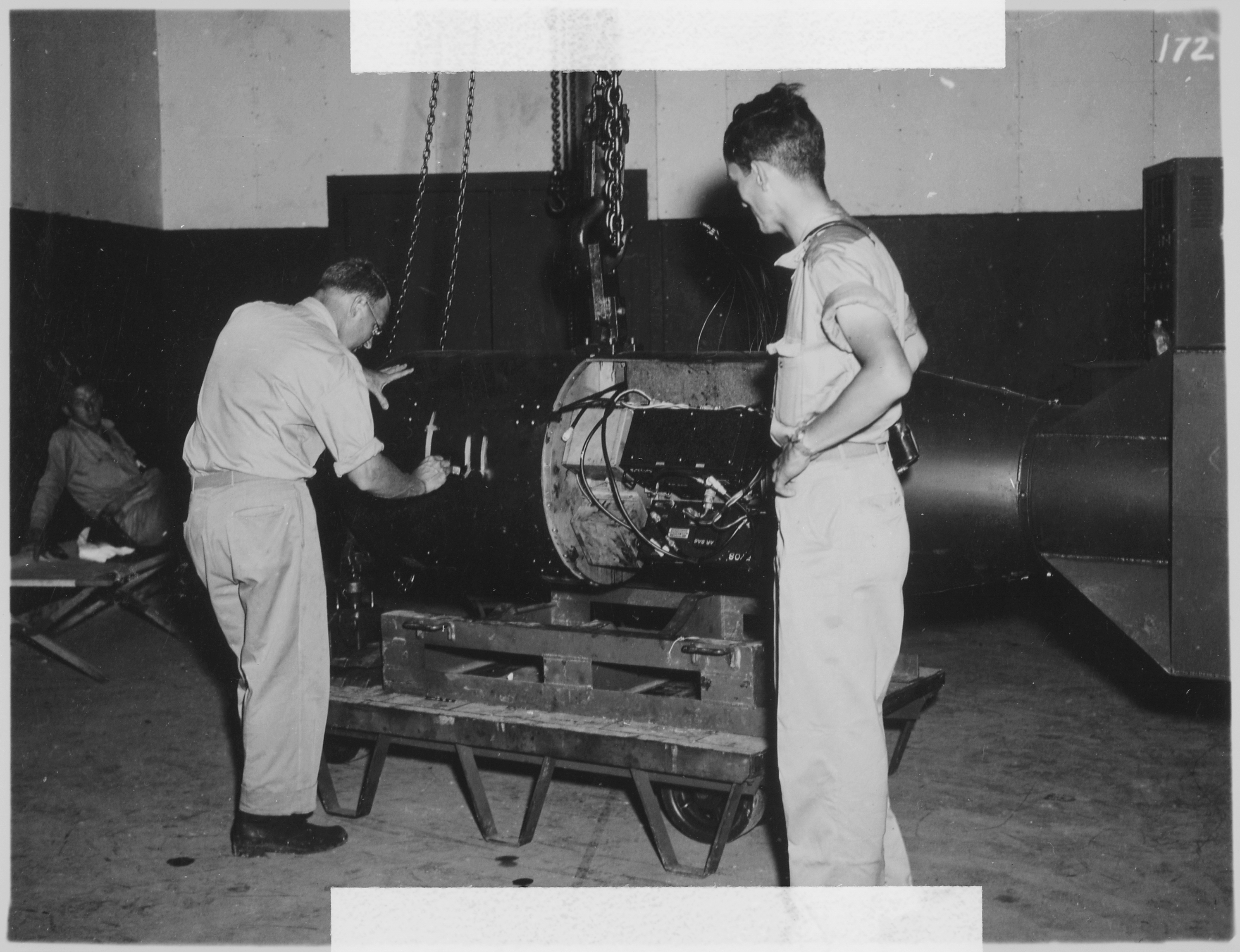
The Little Boy atomic bomb (L-11) being assembled at Tinian a few days after its arrival aboard the Indianapolis

After major repairs and an overhaul, Indianapolis received orders to undertake a top-secret mission: transporting a "critical shipment" of material for the first atomic bomb to Tinian Island. In its hold was loaded the complete non-nuclear parts for a Little Boy gun-type atomic bomb unit (L-11) and several hundred pounds of scientific instruments and tools. Also on board was the bomb's enriched uranium "projectile", in the form of 38.5-kilogram (85 lb) discs, which were kept inside a lead-lined steel container that was bolted and chained to the floor of Captain McVay's quarters for the duration of the journey. Two representatives of the Manhattan Project, Major Robert R. Furman and Dr. James F. Nolan, accompanied them on the journey incognito. Nolan, the Chief Medical Officer for Project Y, was there to monitor the uranium's radioactivity. Nolan was frequently seasick on the journey, which he used as an excuse to surreptitiously monitor the container.

The Fat Man atomic bomb, used against Nagasaki, was transported by air to Tinian. Other equipment necessary for the atomic bomb mission, including "spare" non-nuclear assemblies, had been previously sent to Tinian on other surface ships. Ships were the preferred method for sending critical materials, when time allowed for it, because the risk of loss was considered smaller than going by air. While not particularly radioactive by itself, the amount of enriched uranium in the shipment was large enough to pose a criticality risk under certain circumstances, such as being submerged in water (which acts as a neutron moderator, decreasing the critical mass).

Indianapolis departed San Francisco's Hunters Point Naval Shipyard on 16 July 1945, within hours of the Trinity test in New Mexico. She set a speed record of 74 1/2 hours from San Francisco to Pearl Harbor, an average speed of 29 kn (54 km/h; 33 mph). Arriving at Pearl Harbor on 19 July, she raced on unaccompanied, delivering the atomic bomb components to Tinian on 26 July.

On the same day that Indianapolis offloaded its cargo at Tinian, the remaining 25.6 kilograms (56 lb) of enriched uranium used for the "target" piece of the bomb was divided into three pieces and sent on three different C-54 cargo planes from Albuquerque, New Mexico. By 29 July, all three had arrived at Tinian and the next day the assembly of the L-11 atomic bomb unit began. The weapon, which would be dropped on Hiroshima on the morning of 6 August, would be inscribed with numerous autographs and graffiti by ground crews who loaded it into the plane. One of them read: "Greetings to the Emperor from the men of the Indianapolis". Later General Groves learned that the ship was a "very poor choice" to carry the expensive bomb components, as she had "no underwater sound equipment, and was so designed that a single torpedo was able to sink her quickly".

After its stop at Tinian, Indianapolis then continued on its route to Guam, where a number of the crew who had completed their tours of duty were relieved by other sailors. Leaving Guam on 28 July, she began sailing toward Leyte, where her crew was to receive training before continuing on to Okinawa to join Vice Admiral Jesse B. Oldendorf's Task Force 95.

== Sinking ==
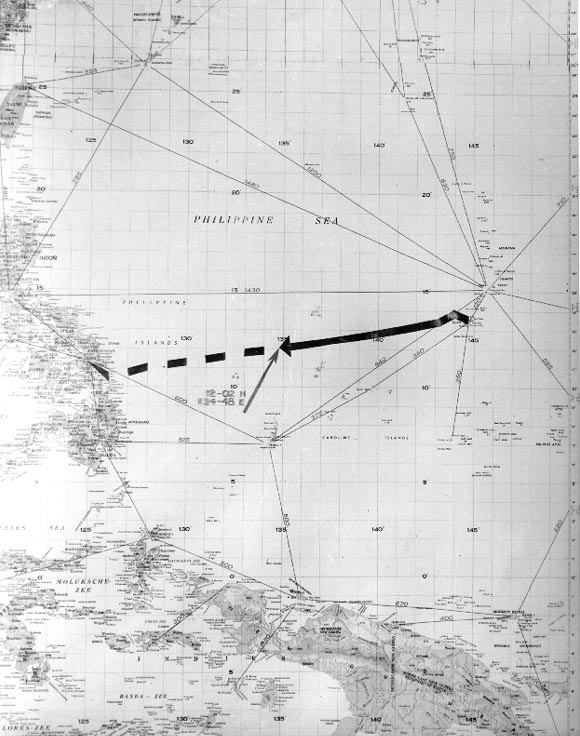
Indianapolis's intended route from Guam to the Philippines

At 00:15 on 30 July 1945, Indianapolis was struck on her starboard side by two Type 95 torpedoes, one in the bow and one amidships, from the Japanese submarine I-58, captained by Commander Mochitsura Hashimoto, who initially thought he had spotted the New Mexico-class battleship Idaho. The explosions caused massive damage. Indianapolis took on a heavy list (the ship had a great deal of armament and gun-firing directors added as the war went on, and was therefore top-heavy) and settled by the bow. Twelve minutes later, she rolled completely over, then her stern rose into the air and she sank. Some 300 of the 1,195 crewmen aboard went down with the ship. With few lifeboats and many without life jackets, the remainder of the crew was set adrift.

=== Rescue ===
Navy command did not know of the ship's sinking until survivors were spotted in the open ocean three and a half days later. At 11:25 on 2 August, a PV-1 Ventura flown by Lieutenant Wilbur "Chuck" Gwinn and his copilot, Lieutenant Warren Colwell, and a crew of three other men spotted the men adrift while on a routine patrol flight. Gwinn reported his findings of up to 150 men back to his base at Peleliu. He immediately dropped a life raft, other life-saving equipment and radio transmitter. All air and surface units capable of rescue operations were dispatched to the scene at once.

First to arrive was Gwinn's commanding officer, Lieutenant Richard Atteberry. He and his PV-1 crew relieved Gwinn's crew, ordering them to return to base because of very low fuel. Atteberry continued to circle the area and guided the arrival on scene by an amphibious PBY-5A Catalina patrol plane flown by Lieutenant Commander (USN) Robert Adrian Marks. Marks and his flight crew spotted the survivors and dropped life rafts; one raft was destroyed by the drop while others were too far away from the exhausted crew. Against standing orders not to land in the open ocean, Marks took a vote of his crew and decided to land the aircraft in twelve-foot (3.7 m) swells. He was able to maneuver his craft to pick up 56 survivors. Space in the plane was limited, so Marks had men lashed to the wing with parachute cord. His actions rendered the aircraft unflyable. After nightfall, the destroyer escort USS Cecil J. Doyle, the first of seven rescue ships, used its searchlight as a beacon and instilled hope in those still in the water. Cecil J. Doyle and six other ships picked up the remaining survivors. After the rescue, Marks' plane was sunk by Cecil J. Doyle as it could not be recovered.

Many of the survivors were injured. All suffered from lack of food and water (leading to dehydration and hypernatremia; some found rations, such as Spam and crackers, among the flotsam of Indianapolis), exposure to the elements (dehydration from the hot sun during the day and hypothermia at night, as well as severe desquamation due to continued exposure to saltwater and bunker oil), and shark attacks, while some killed themselves. Other survivors were found in various states of delirium or suffered from hallucinations. Only 316 of the 890 men set adrift after the sinking survived. Two of the rescued survivors, Robert Lee Shipman and Frederick Harrison, died in August 1945.

Hundreds of sharks were apparently drawn to the wreck. After picking off the dead and wounded, they began attacking survivors. The number of deaths attributed to sharks ranges from a few dozen to 150.

Ocean of Fear, a 2007 documentary film that was part of Discovery Channel's Shark Week, states that the sinking of Indianapolis resulted in the most shark attacks on humans in history, attributing the attacks to the oceanic whitetip shark species. Tiger sharks may also have killed some sailors. The same show attributed most of the deaths on Indianapolis to exposure, salt poisoning, and thirst/dehydration, with the dead being dragged off by sharks.

=== Navy failure to learn of the sinking ===
The Headquarters of Commander Marianas on Guam and of the Commander Philippine Sea Frontier on Leyte kept Operations plotting boards on which were plotted the positions of all vessels with which the headquarters were concerned. However, it was assumed that ships as large as Indianapolis would reach their destinations on time, unless reported otherwise. Therefore, their positions were based on predictions and not on reports. On 31 July, when she should have arrived at Leyte, Indianapolis was removed from the board in the headquarters of Commander Marianas. She was also recorded as having arrived at Leyte by the headquarters of Commander Philippine Sea Frontier. Lieutenant Stuart B. Gibson, the operations officer under the Port Director, Tacloban, was the officer blamed for not tracking the movements of Indianapolis. The vessel's failure to arrive on schedule was known at once to Gibson, who failed to investigate the matter and made no immediate report of the fact to his superiors. It was common for expected vessels to not arrive, and there was no directive for the port director to report the nonarrival of any ship. Gibson received a letter of reprimand in connection with the incident. The acting commander and operations officer of the Philippine Sea Frontier also received reprimands, while Gibson's immediate superior received a letter of admonition (a less severe military punishment than a reprimand). These letters were later withdrawn.

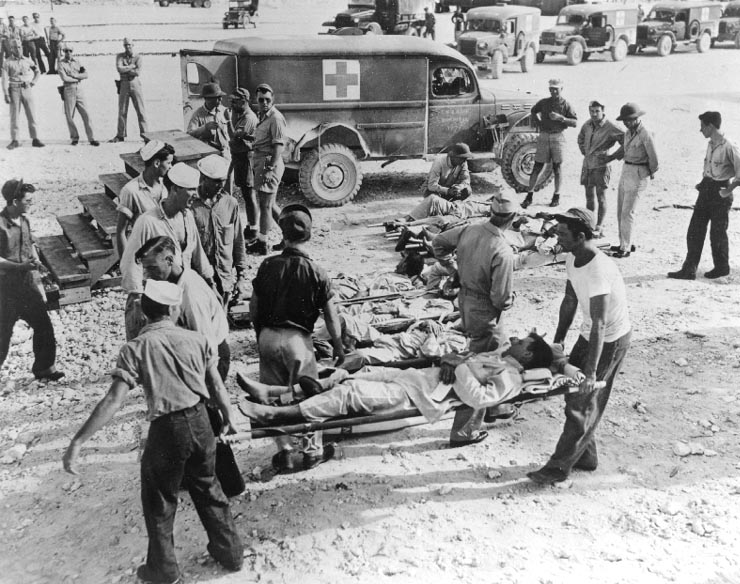
Survivors of Indianapolis on Guam in August 1945

In the first official statement, the Navy said that distress calls "were keyed by radio operators and possibly were actually transmitted" but that "no evidence has been developed that any distress message from the ship was received by any ship, aircraft or shore station". Declassified records later showed that three stations received the signals but none acted upon the call. One commander was drunk, another had ordered his men not to disturb him, and a third thought it was a Japanese trap.

Immediately prior to the attack, the seas had been moderate, the visibility fluctuating but poor in general, and Indianapolis had been steaming at 17 kn (20 mph; 31 km/h). When the ship failed to reach Leyte on 31 July, as scheduled, no report was made that she was overdue. From lessons learned by the disaster, the Navy created the Movement Report System to prevent such disasters in the future.

=== Court-martial of Captain McVay ===
Captain Charles B. McVay III, who had commanded Indianapolis since November 1944 through several battles, survived the sinking, though he was one of the last to abandon ship, and was among those rescued days later. In November 1945, he was court-martialed on two charges: failing to order his men to abandon ship and hazarding the ship. Cleared of the charge of failing to order abandon ship, McVay was convicted of "hazarding his ship by failing to zigzag". Several aspects of the court-martial were controversial. There was evidence that the Navy itself had placed the ship in harm's way. McVay's orders were to "zigzag at his discretion, weather permitting"; however, McVay was not informed that a Japanese submarine was operating in the vicinity of his route from Guam to Leyte. Further, Commander Mochitsura Hashimoto, commanding officer of I-58, wrote in his testimony to Senator John Warner, chairman of the Senate Armed Services Committee, that zigzagging would have made no difference. Fleet Admiral Chester Nimitz remitted McVay's sentence and restored him to active duty. McVay retired in 1949 as a rear admiral.

While many of Indianapolis's survivors said McVay was not to blame for the sinking, the families of some of the men who died thought otherwise: "Merry Christmas! Our family's holiday would be a lot merrier if you hadn't killed my son", read one piece of mail. The guilt that was placed on his shoulders mounted until he killed himself in 1968, aged 70.

=== McVay's record cleared ===
In 1996, sixth-grade student Hunter Scott began his research on the sinking of Indianapolis for a class history project. Scott's effort led to an increase in national publicity, which got the attention of retired Congressional lobbyist Michael Monroney, who had been scheduled to be assigned to Indianapolis before she shipped out on her final voyage. Around the same time, Captain William J. Toti, USN, final commanding officer of the fast attack nuclear submarine USS Indianapolis (SSN-697) received an appeal from several Indianapolis survivors to assist with the exoneration effort. Toti then demonstrated through analysis that the tactic of zigzagging would not have spared the Indianapolis from at least one torpedo hit by the I-58. Monroney brought the matter to the attention of his son-in-law, who was on the staff of Senator Bob Smith (R, NH) and was able to get the issue in front of Smith. Smith convinced Senator John Warner (R, VA) to hold hearings on the Senate Armed Services Committee on 14 September 1999, in which several Indianapolis survivors testified. Also called to testify in the hearings were Vice Chief of Naval Operations Admiral Donald Pilling, Director of the Naval History Center Dr. William Dudley, and the Judge Advocate General of the Navy Rear Admiral John Hutson. The hearings were reported to sway Senator Warner into allowing a "Sense of Congress" resolution clearing Captain McVay's name to be passed to full Congress for a vote. In October 2000, the United States Congress passed a resolution that Captain McVay's record should state that "he is exonerated for the loss of Indianapolis". President Bill Clinton also signed the resolution. The resolution noted that, although several hundred ships of the U.S. Navy were lost in combat during World War II, McVay was the only captain to be court-martialed for the loss of his ship due to enemy action in combat. In July 2001, United States Secretary of the Navy Gordon England directed Captain Toti to enter the Congressional language into McVay's official Navy service record, clearing him of all wrongdoing. Scott, the sixth-grade student, later in his life joined the Navy and became a naval aviator, served as the protocol officer for the chairman of the Joint Chiefs of Staff at the Pentagon, and currently holds the rank of commander.

== Commanders ==
Commanders of USS Indianapolis:

Rank	Name	Date
Captain	John M. Smeallie	15 November 1932 – 10 December 1934
Captain	William S. McClintic	10 December 1934 – 16 March 1936
Captain	Henry Kent Hewitt	16 March 1936 – 5 June 1937
Captain	Thomas C. Kinkaid	5 June 1937 – 1 July 1938
Captain	John F. Shafroth Jr.	1 July 1938 – 1 October 1941
Captain	Edward Hanson	1 October 1941 – 11 July 1942
Captain	Morton L. Deyo	11 July 1942 – 12 January 1943
Captain	Nicholas Vytlacil	12 January 1943 – 30 July 1943
Captain	Einar R. Johnson	30 July 1943 – 18 November 1944
Captain	Charles B. McVay III	18 November 1944 – 30 July 1945

== Awards ==

- Combat Action Ribbon
- American Defense Service Medal with fleet clasp
- Asiatic–Pacific Campaign Medal with ten battle stars
- American Campaign Medal
- World War II Victory Medal

== Wreck discovery ==
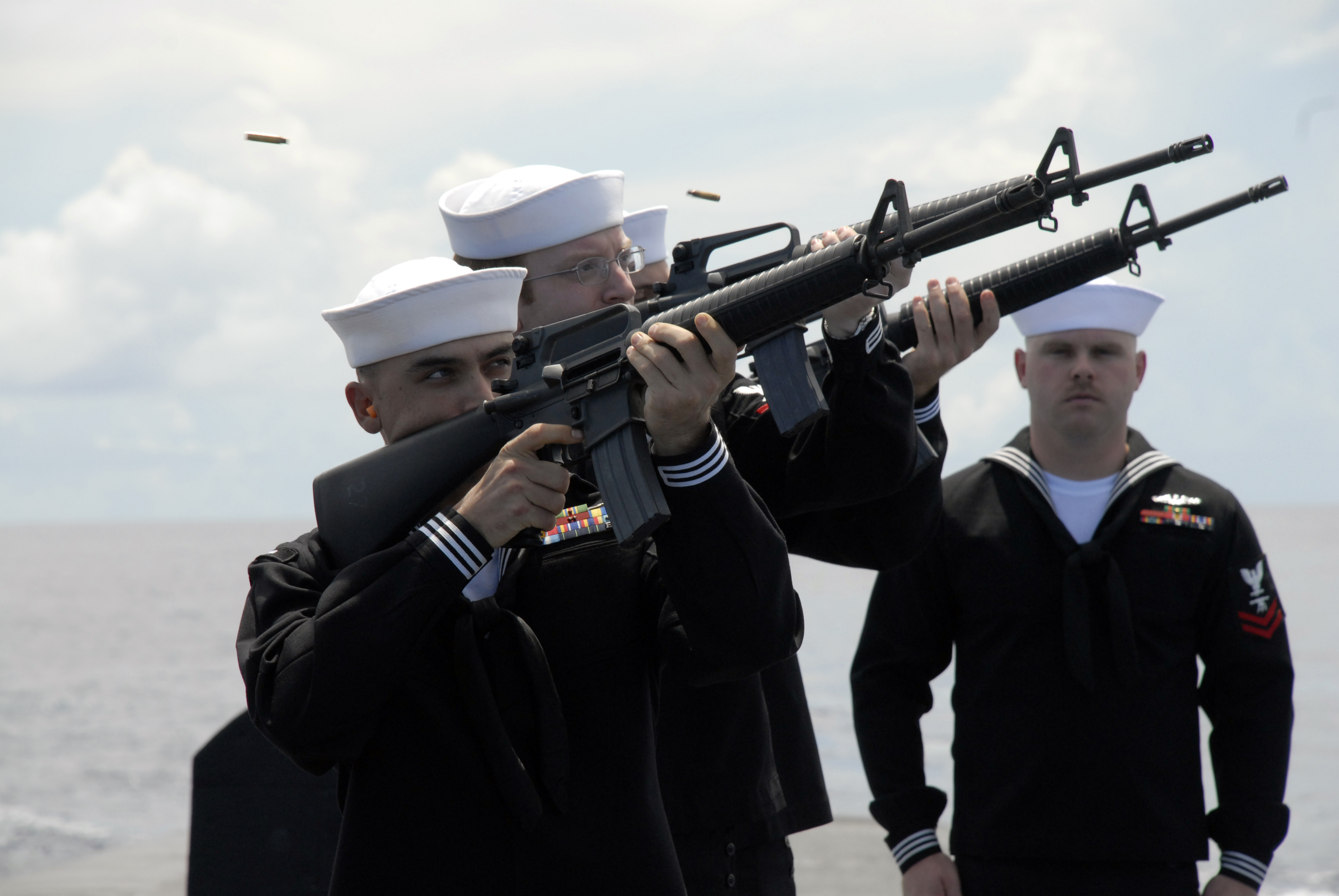
Navy firing detail as part of a burial-at-sea in 2008, for one of the 316 survivors of Indianapolis sinking on 30 July 1945

The wreck of Indianapolis is in the Philippine Sea. In July–August 2001, an expedition sought to find the wreckage through the use of side-scan sonar and underwater cameras mounted on a remotely operated vehicle. Four Indianapolis survivors accompanied the expedition, which was not successful. In June 2005, a second expedition was mounted to find the wreck. National Geographic covered the story and released it in July. Submersibles were launched to find any sign of wreckage, although they only located pieces of metal that were not proven conclusively to be from the ship.

In July 2016, new information emerged regarding the possible location of Indianapolis when naval records were discovered indicating that the tank landing ship LST-779 recorded passing by Indianapolis 11 hours before the torpedoes struck. This information allowed researchers to determine that Indianapolis had been moving faster and was therefore farther west than previously assumed, as well as slightly off the route taken. Using this information, National Geographic planned to mount an expedition to search for the wreck in the summer of 2017. Reports estimated that Indianapolis was actually 25 miles (40 km) west of the reported sinking position, in water over three miles (4,800 m) deep, and likely on the side of an underwater mountain.

A year after the discovery of the records, the wreck was located by Paul Allen's "USS Indianapolis Project" aboard the research vessel Petrel on 19 August 2017, at a depth of 18,000 ft (5,500 m). The wreck was revealed to the public on 13 September 2017, in a live TV show on PBS titled "USS Indianapolis, Live from the Deep", starring Miles O'Brien and also including now-retired Captain William Toti. The wreck is well-preserved due to the great depth at which Indianapolis rests, among the rocky mountain ranges of the North Philippine Sea.

In September 2017, a map detailing the wreckage was released. The main part of the wreck lies in an enormous impact crater; her bow, which broke off before the ship sank, lies 1.5 miles (2.4 km) east. The two forward 8-inch gun turrets, which also broke off on the surface and mark the ship's last position on the surface, lie 0.5 miles (0.80 km) east of the main wreck. The bridge, which broke off the ship due to the torpedoes, lies in a debris field near the forward guns. The single 8-inch gun turret on the stern remains in place, though the stern's roof collapsed over itself. Airplane wreckage from the ship lies about 0.6 miles (0.97 km) north of the main part of the wreck. The full exposition of the method by which the wreck was located and documented was released in another PBS documentary on 8 January 2019 titled USS Indianapolis: The Final Chapter.

== Reunions ==
Since 1960, surviving crew members met for reunions in Indianapolis. Fourteen of the thirty-two remaining survivors attended the 70th reunion, held 23–26 July 2015. Held only sporadically at first, then biannually, the reunions were later held annually. By 2015 most of the survivors were in their nineties, voted every year whether to continue. Seven out of twenty remaining survivors attended the 2017 reunion. With the death of Cleatus Lebow on 29 September 2022, there is only one crew member still alive, Harold Bray.

== Memorials ==
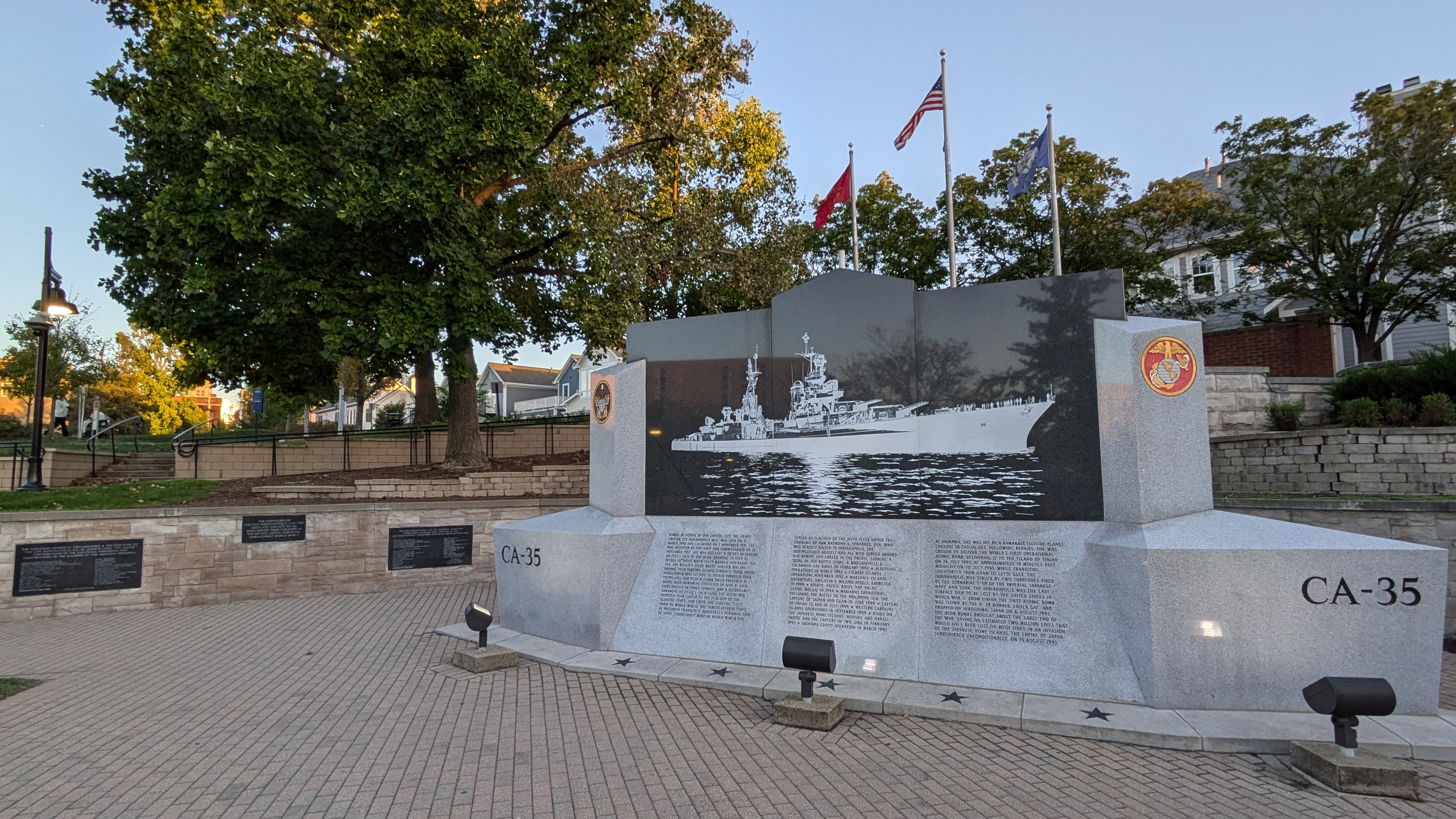
USS Indianapolis National Memorial in Indianapolis, Indiana, 2024

The USS Indianapolis Museum had its grand opening on 7 July 2007, with its gallery in the Indiana War Memorial Museum at the Indiana World War Memorial Plaza.

The USS Indianapolis National Memorial was dedicated on 2 August 1995. It is located in Indianapolis, Indiana, in the city's Canal and White River State Park cultural district. The heavy cruiser is depicted in limestone and granite and sits adjacent to the downtown canal. The crewmembers' names are listed on the monument, with special notations for those who died. It was designated a national memorial by Congress in 1993.

In May 2011, the I-465 beltway around Indianapolis was named the USS Indianapolis Memorial Highway.

USS Indianapolis is the name of the Navy's combat training pool, located at RTC Great Lakes. This facility is used during Navy boot camp to test recruit swimming ability, and to instruct recruits who lack those skills. The building was dedicated to those who lost their lives at sea, with the intent of providing training to recruits on how to survive until a rescue is made.

Some material relating to Indianapolis is held by the Indiana State Museum. Her bell and a commissioning pennant were formerly located at Heslar Naval Armory but currently reside at the Indiana War Memorial Museum.

== In popular culture ==
In a scene in the 1975 movie Jaws, one of the main characters, Quint, who is a survivor of Indianapolis, recounts the sinking and shark attacks. This scene brought Indianapolis, and her sinking, into a much wider public spotlight 30 years after the events occurred. The 2019 play The Shark Is Broken, which opened on Broadway in 2023, both explores Robert Shaw (Quint's actor) rewriting the dialogue to the scene, as well as doing a full rendition of the famous scene at the end.

The sinking is the subject of the 1991 made-for-TV film Mission of the Shark: The Saga of the U.S.S. Indianapolis, starring Stacy Keach.

The 2014 novel Shark, by English writer Will Self, is based on the sinking of Indianapolis.

The 2016 film USS Indianapolis: Men of Courage, directed by Mario Van Peebles and starring Nicolas Cage, is based on the sinking.

== See also ==
- USS Juneau (CL-52), another U.S. Navy cruiser sunk during World War II with substantial loss of life attributed to delayed rescue efforts
- List of U.S. Navy losses in World War II
- List of ships sunk by submarines by death toll
- List of United States Navy cruisers
- List of national memorials of the United States
