= Movement Report System =

The Movement Report System (MOVREP) is a system established to collect and make available to certain commands vital information on the status, location, and movement of flag commands, commissioned fleet units, and ships under the operational control of the United States Navy and U.S. Coast Guard. Such reports help in identifying ships that are lost or missing. The Movement Report System was started for commissioned fleet units and ships under operational control of the Navy. First done by hand, the information is now entered electronically into an electronic data processing system. MOVREP Data is used:

- To provide accurate positional data on friendly forces to operational commanders.
- To monitor the safe and timely arrival of ships.
- To provide information to other systems for personnel and logistics distribution.
- To provide accurate locations in the event of emergencies, such as search and rescue (SAR) and evacuation efforts.
- To support requirements for planned force levels.
- To provide Chief of Naval Operations with historical data for analysis.

== MAREP ==
MAREP (MAriner REPort) is a voluntary ship reporting system, for movement reporting in the Strait of Dover in English Channel.

== See also ==
- USS Indianapolis (CA-35), which was sunk. Its failure to arrive was reported incorrectly, leading to the sailors spending four days in the water before being spotted by a patrol plane. To avoid repeating this problem, the Navy created the MOVREP system.
- Navigation
- Marine radar
- Structure of the United States Navy
