= USS Key West (SSN-722) =

Los Angeles-class nuclear-powered attack submarine of the US Navy

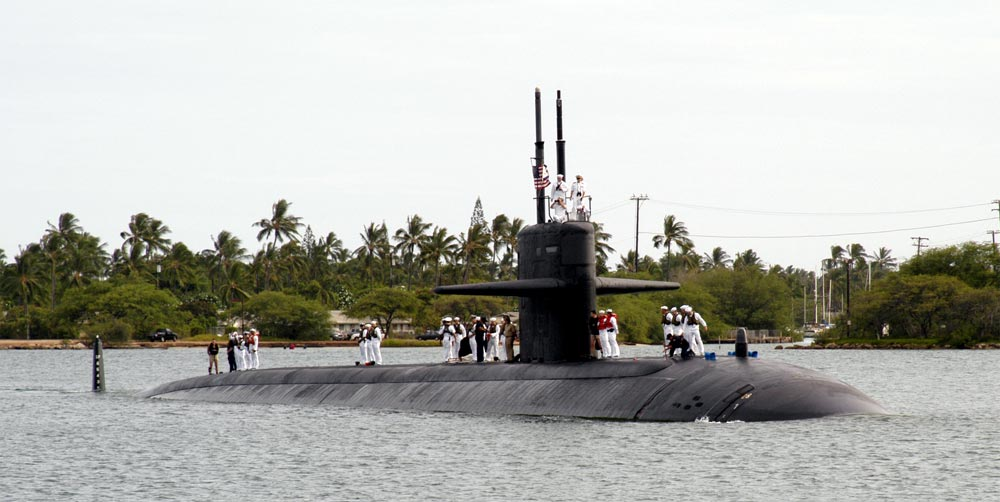
- USS Key West (SSN-722) entering Pearl Harbor

History

United States
- Name: Key West
- Namesake: City of Key West, Florida
- Builder: NGNN
- Laid down: 6 July 1983
- Launched: 20 July 1985
- Commissioned: 12 September 1987
- Decommissioned: 22 July 2024
- Out of service: 21 September 2023
- Home port: Naval Base Kitsap-Bremerton
- Status: Stricken, final disposition pending
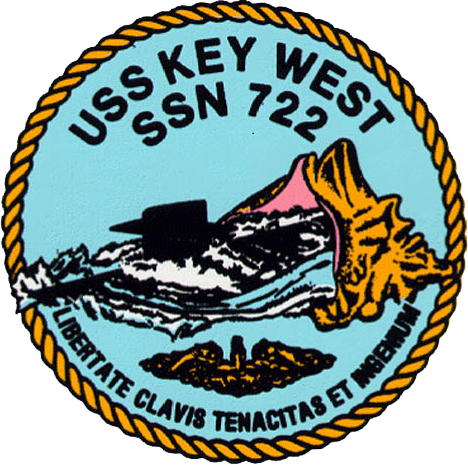
- Badge

General characteristics
- Class & type: Los Angeles-class submarine
- Displacement: 5,799 tons light, 6,206 tons full, 407 tons dead
- Length: 110.3 m (361.9 ft)
- Beam: 10 m (32.8 ft)
- Draft: 9.4 m (30.8 ft)
- Propulsion: 1 × S6G PWR nuclear reactor with D2W core (165 MW), HEU 93.5%; 2 × steam turbines (33,500) shp; 1 × shaft; 1 × secondary propulsion motor 325 hp (242 kW)
- Speed: Surfaced:20 knots (23 mph; 37 km/h); Submerged: In excess of 25 knots (29 mph; 46 km/h) (official)
- Test depth: In excess of 800 ft (243.8 m)
- Complement: 16 officers, 127 enlisted
- Sensors & processing systems: BQQ-10 ARCI passive sonar, BQS-15 high frequency active sonar, WLR-8 fire control radar receiver, WLR-9 acoustic receiver for detection of active search sonar and acoustic homing torpedoes, BRD-7 radio direction finder
- Armament: 4 × 21 in (533 mm) midships torpedo tubes, 12 x bow vertical launch tubes (for BGM-109 Tomahawks), up to 25 horizontal reloads (combination of Mk48 ADCAP torpedo or Tomahawk land attack missile block 3 SLCM range 1,700 nautical miles (3,100 km)), mine laying Mk67 mobile Mk60 captor mines

USS Key West (SSN-722), a Los Angeles-class submarine, was the third ship of the United States Navy to be named after Key West, Florida.

== Construction ==
The contract to build her was awarded to Newport News Shipbuilding and Dry Dock Company in Newport News, Virginia, on 13 August 1981, and her keel was laid down on 6 July 1983. She was launched on 20 July 1985, sponsored by Mrs. Virginia Conn, and commissioned on 12 September 1987, with Commander Warren Lipscomb, Jr. in command. She is the fourth Los Angeles-class submarine equipped with the vertical launch system (VLS) capable of carrying 12 Tomahawk land attack cruise missiles (TLAM).

== Service history ==
Key West was home ported at the Norfolk Naval Base, Norfolk, Virginia. She operated out of Norfolk, until 1995. During her Atlantic Fleet service, she completed numerous Cold War deployments and supported operations in the Caribbean, Western Atlantic and Mediterranean. Key West was awarded the "Hook-em" antisubmarine warfare (ASW) excellence award following her 1990 Mediterranean Cruise. She later was awarded the Meritorious Unit Commendation award for her superior performance in Cold War operations during the 1989 and 1990 deployments. Key West won the "TOP TORP" Torpedo Shooting Competition in 1992, and was later awarded the Submarine Squadron Eight Battle "E" for that year.

Key West deployed with the Theodore Roosevelt Carrier Battle Group in 1995. During that deployment she operated in the Mediterranean Sea and Persian Gulf and was awarded the Navy Unit Commendation, Armed Forces Service, and NATO Service medals. Following the 1995 deployment, Key West underwent an availability in Norfolk, in preparation for her transfer to the Pacific Fleet in 1996. She departed Norfolk, in June 1996, and transited the Panama Canal as part of her transfer to the Pacific Fleet. She arrived in Pearl Harbor, Hawaii in July 1996, and began operations under Submarine Squadron One.

Key West visited her name sake city in 1987, for a week-long celebration after commissioning, 1992, and 1994. Since reassignment to the Pacific Fleet she has not been able to visit Key West again.

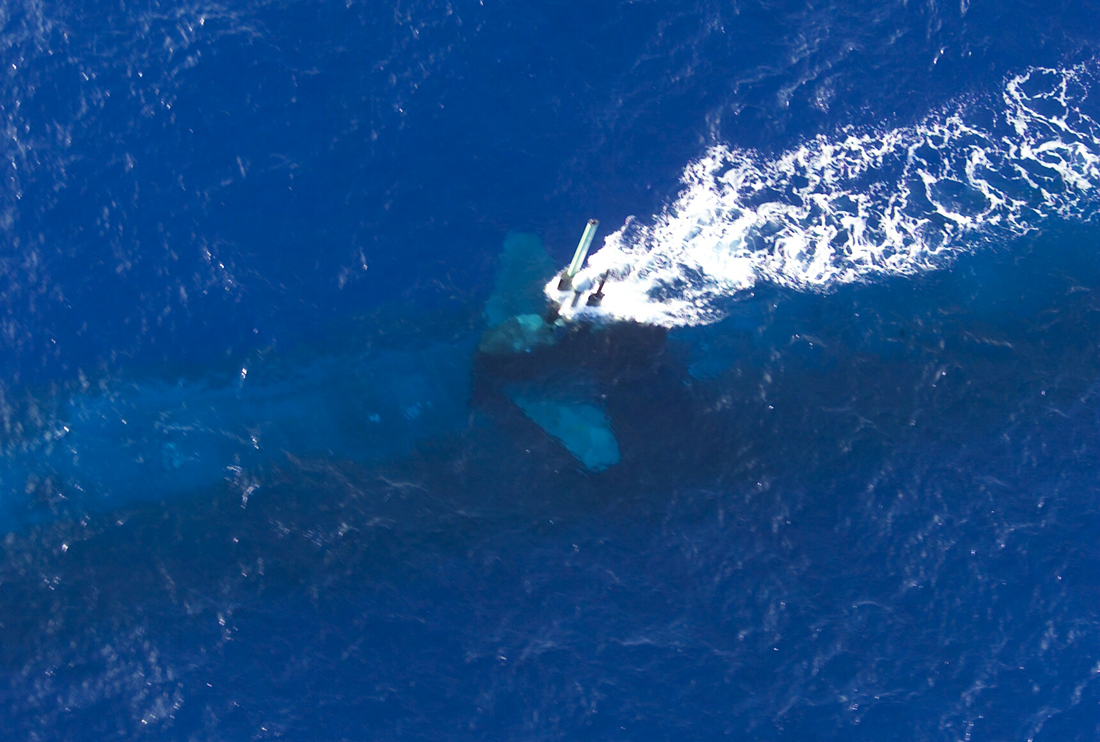
Key West at periscope depth, RIMPAC 2004.

In April 1997, Key West conducted her first Pacific deployment with the Constellation Carrier Battle Group. During this deployment, she operated in the Pacific Ocean, Indian Ocean and the Persian Gulf. Later that year, Key West was reassigned to Submarine Squadron Three. In the next year, she deployed to the Eastern Pacific in support of the Carl Vinson and Abraham Lincoln Carrier Battle Groups, and later supported the 1998 Rim of the Pacific (RIMPAC) exercise.

From 1998 through 2001, she supported Pacific theater operations in both the Third Fleet and Seventh Fleet area of operations. During this time she participated in numerous bilateral and multilateral exercises with our Pacific Theater partner. Following the 11 September attacks, she was redirected Bahrain to the Northern Arabian Sea where she launched Tomahawk Land Attack Cruise Missiles against Afghanistan in October 2001.

In 2003, 2005 and 2007 Key West conducted deployments to the Western Pacific in support of Seventh Fleet operations.

In 2007, Key West was named "Battle E" for COMSUBRON THREE, given to the best submarine in its squadron, awarded the Arleigh Burke Trophy for the most improved sea command in the Pacific, and awarded the Naval Unit Commendation for its outstanding accomplishments during the deployment.

In 2009, Key West was again awarded the "Battle E" award for COMSUBRON Three for outstanding performance during the 2009 WESTPAC deployment.

In 2012, Key West shifted home port to Naval Base Guam to support Seventh Fleet operations as a forward deployed unit.

In 2016, Key West was again awarded the "Battle E" award for COMSUBRON Fifteen.

In 2018, Key West was awarded the Hugh McCraken Award for the top Chiefs Mess in the Pacific Submarine Force.

On 31 October 2022, Key West arrived at Busan, South Korea, for a scheduled port visit.

Key West returned from her final deployment in November 2022.

On 16 January 2023, Key West arrived at the Puget Sound Naval Shipyard and was placed in the reserve fleet to await decommissioning. Following the completion of the decommissioning process, the hull's ownership was transferred to the shipyard on 12 September 2025.

== Command emblem ==
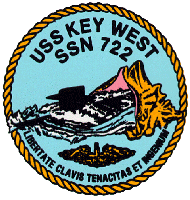

The conch shell is the focal point of the submarine's emblem for the fabled horn of the Greek God Triton and the symbol of the submarine's namesake city. Key West is emerging from the shell which symbolizes the emergence of the city as the leading city of the Florida Keys.

The submarine insignia symbolizes the heritage that the ship has with all past and future submarines. The motto "Libertate Clavis Tenacitas et Ingenium" translates to "The Key to Freedom is Tenacity and Resourcefulness". Specifically, the phrase "The Key to Freedom" represents the namesake city and the submarine's mission to protect the fundamental rights and liberties of the American people. The phrase "Tenacity and Resourcefulness" was used by the Mayor of Key West during his speech at the ship's launching to describe the characteristics of a true Conch —a native of Key West. Additionally, "Ingenium" is a word used by the ancient Greek and Roman historians to describe the resourcefulness and ingenuity of sailors in the period.

== In popular fiction ==
In the Tom Clancy novel Red Storm Rising, Key West participated in a cruise missile strike against the Soviet Union.

In the novel Kirov III-Pacific Storm by John Schettler, Key West is involved in a critical action with the Russian Battlecruiser Kirov II.

In the Swedish novel Landsförrädaren by Anders Jallai, Key West makes an appearance to save the protagonist.
