= USS Indianapolis (SSN-697) =

Los Angeles-class nuclear-powered attack submarine of the US Navy

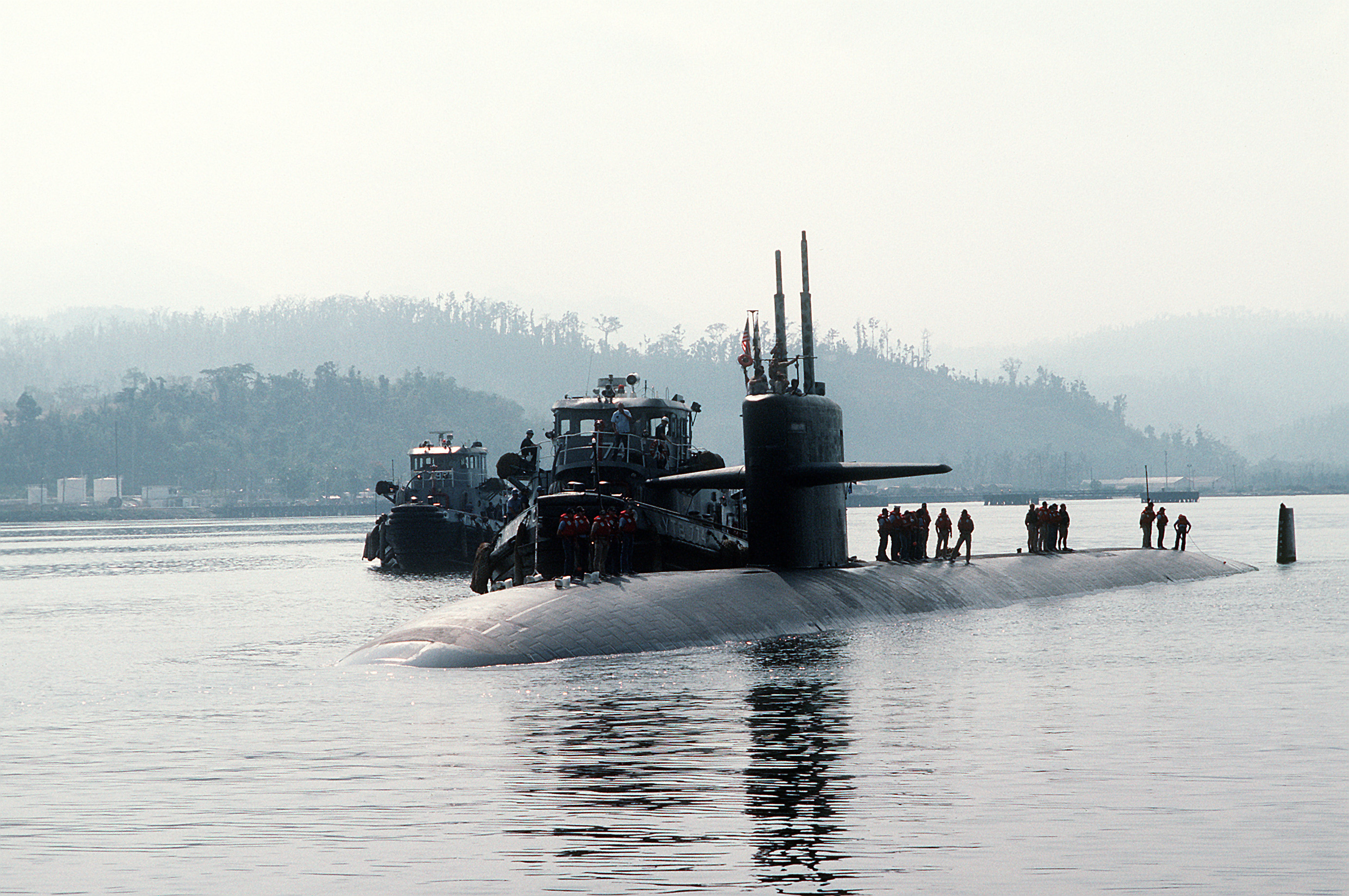
- Indianapolis in harbour

History

United States
- Name: USS Indianapolis
- Awarded: 24 January 1972
- Builder: General Dynamics Corporation
- Laid down: 19 October 1974
- Launched: 30 July 1977
- Commissioned: 5 January 1980
- Decommissioned: 22 December 1998
- Stricken: 22 December 1998
- Fate: Recycling begun Sail resides at memorial at Indiana Military Museum.
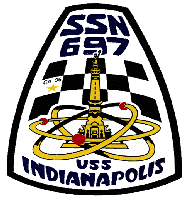
- Badge

General characteristics
- Class & type: Los Angeles-class submarine
- Displacement: 5,784 tons light; 6,154 tons full; 370 tons dead
- Length: 110.3 m (361 ft 11 in)
- Beam: 10 m (32 ft 10 in)
- Draft: 9.7 m (31 ft 10 in)
- Propulsion: S6G nuclear reactor with D1G Core 2 Reactor, 148 MW
- Complement: 12 officers, 98 enlisted
- Armament: 4 × 21 in (533 mm) torpedo tubes

The third USS Indianapolis (SSN-697), a Los Angeles-class submarine, was the third ship of the United States Navy to be named for Indianapolis, Indiana. The contract to build her was awarded to the Electric Boat Division of General Dynamics Corporation in Groton, Connecticut, on 24 January 1972 and her keel was laid down on 19 October 1974. She was launched on 30 July 1977 sponsored by Esther Debra Bray (née Taylor), wife of former Congressman William G. Bray, and commissioned on 5 January 1980.

When Indianapolis was commissioned, many survivors of the cruiser Indianapolis were present for the official ceremony. The submarine's home port was shifted to Pearl Harbor, Hawaii in 1980, operating out of Pearl Harbor for the remainder of her active service. After the boat's final deployment from April to October 1997, she was awarded the Battle Efficiency E and a Navy Unit Commendation. Both were the first time the submarine had received such awards in her 18-year history.

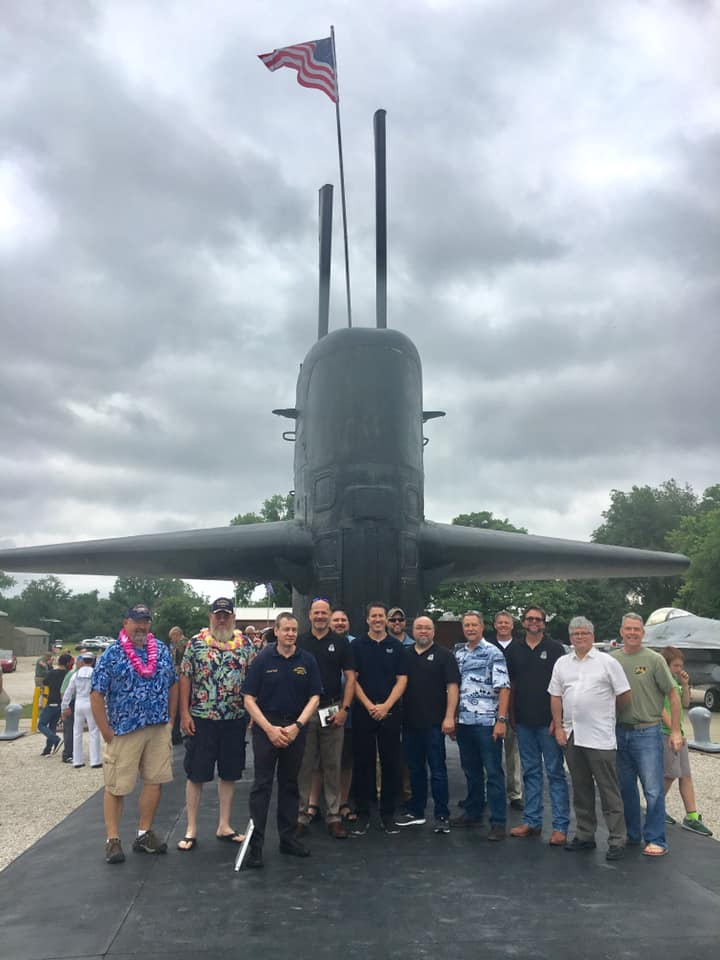
Former crew with the sail from the USS Indianapolis (SSN 697) on 8 June 2019, at the dedication ceremony and reunion at the Indiana Military Museum in Vincennes, Indiana.

As a result of the ending of the Cold War and the so-called "Peace Dividend", the boat was inactivated in 1998, only 18 years into her 30-year life.

The sail and other parts of Indianapolis (SSN 697) were dedicated as a memorial at the Indiana Military Museum in Vincennes, Indiana, on 8 June 2019. Attendees at the commemoration ceremony included former crewmen and officers of the boat.
