= USS Yankton =

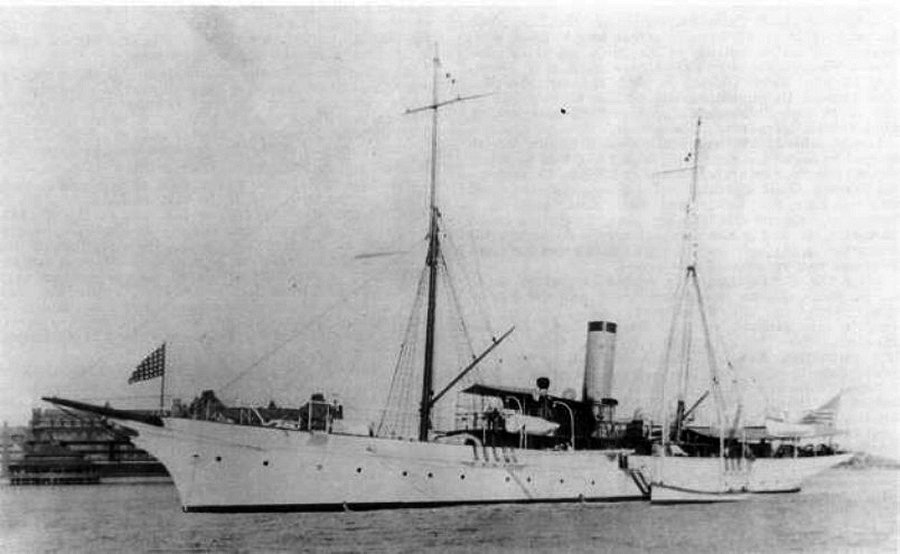

History

United States
- Commissioned: 16 May 1898
- Decommissioned: 27 February 1920
- Fate: Sold on 20 October 1921; Converted to mercantile service; Broken up in 1930

General characteristics
- Displacement: 975 tons
- Length: 185 ft (56 m)
- Beam: 27.6 ft (8.4 m)
- Draft: 13.1 ft (4.0 m)
- Speed: 14 knots (26 km/h; 16 mph)
- Complement: 78 officers and enlisted
- Armament: 6 × 3-pounder guns; 2 × Colt machine guns

USS Yankton (previously named Cleopatra, Saphire III, Penelope) was a steel-hulled schooner built in 1893 at Leith, Scotland, by Ramage & Ferguson. She was built as SY Cleopatra for John Lysaght in 1893 and sold to American Amzi L. Barber in 1895 who renamed her Sapphire.

She was acquired by the US Navy in May 1898; renamed Yankton; and commissioned on 16 May 1898 at Norfolk, Virginia.

According to Charles Armstrong, who was the medical officer of Yankton in 1918, Penelope had been the extravagant yacht of Sarah Bernhardt, a well-known French actress. That Bernhardt connection is noted in the United States Coast Guard history on rum runners as being "erroneous" but notes that the vessel had become an American yacht sold to the Navy at the beginning of the Spanish–American War. She was converted to a gunboat by the US Navy and partook in the Spanish–American War serving as a gunboat, admiral's yacht and fleet tender. On 27 November 1903 she sank the steamship Hustler in a collision at Norfolk, Virginia. Her Captain at the time was Lt. Castleman.

Yankton accompanied the Navy's Great White Fleet on the "round the world cruise" as a fleet tender in 1907–1908 and was at Veracruz during the 1914 crisis there. In World War I she headed for Gibraltar to join the Patrol Forces protecting Allied shipping from German U-boats, and she came under hostile fire during combat. Yankton was sold in 1921.

The vessel was libeled and sold by the British Admiralty Court in Nassau, Bahamas then seized and sold again within weeks. A crew of mixed nationality, described as "motley" and "buccaneers" was recruited in Havana where 8,000 cases of grain alcohol valued at $500,000 and Cuban tobacco was placed aboard, ostensibly destined for St. Pierre with actual destination being "Rum Row" with sales along the coast on the way. The vessel was at times termed "The Queen of Rum Row" but fell on very hard times and being swindled of much of her cargo. Eventually, out of fuel and money, steam was raised by chopping up interior woodwork and on 23 May 1923 the master surrendered to customs agents at the quarantine anchorage in New York. Free again the ship ran aground on Nixes Mate in Boston harbor during a January snowstorm in 1925. The ship was broken up at Boston during the summer of 1930.

== Bibliography ==
- Eger, Christopher L. (March 2021). "Hudson Fulton Celebration, Part II". Warship International. LVIII (1): 58–81. ISSN 0043-0374.
