= USS LST-779 =

1944 LST-542-class tank landing ship

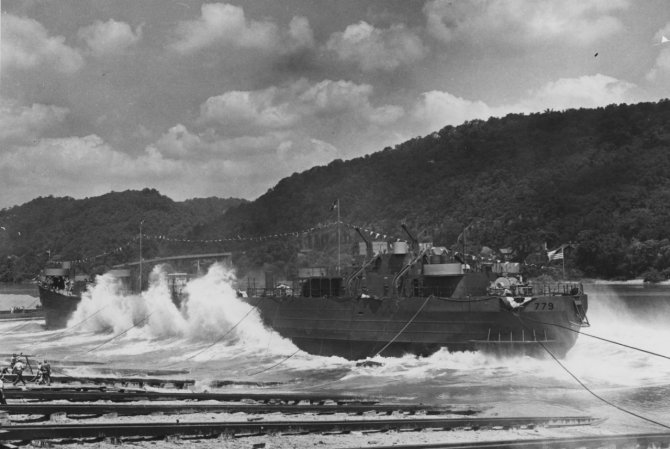
- USS LST-779 launching at Dravo Corp., Pittsburgh, Pennsylvania, 1 July 1944. The restricted areas of inland waterways necessitating a side launch.

History

United States
- Name: LST-779
- Builder: Dravo Corporation, Pittsburgh, Pennsylvania
- Laid down: 21 May 1944
- Launched: 1 July 1944
- Sponsored by: Mrs. Andrew Vavrek
- Commissioned: 3 August 1944
- Decommissioned: 18 May 1946
- Identification: Hull symbol: LST-779; Code letters: NGUY
- Honors and awards: 2 × battle stars
- Fate: Sold, 5 December 1947
- Status: Offered back to the Navy, 2 May 1951, turned down 18 May 1951, fate unknown

General characteristics
- Class & type: LST-542-class tank landing ship
- Displacement: 1,625 long tons (1,651 t) (light); 4,080 long tons (4,145 t) (full (seagoing draft with 1,675 short tons (1,520 t) load); 2,366 long tons (2,404 t) (beaching)
- Length: 328 ft (100 m) oa
- Beam: 50 ft (15 m)
- Draft: Unloaded: 2 ft 4 in (0.71 m) forward; 7 ft 6 in (2.29 m) aft; Full load: 8 ft 3 in (2.51 m) forward; 14 ft 1 in (4.29 m) aft; Landing with 500 short tons (450 t) load: 3 ft 11 in (1.19 m) forward; 9 ft 10 in (3.00 m) aft; Limiting 11 ft 2 in (3.40 m); Maximum navigation 14 ft 1 in (4.29 m)
- Installed power: 2 × 900 hp (670 kW) Electro-Motive Diesel 12-567A diesel engines; 1,800 shp (1,300 kW)
- Propulsion: 1 × Falk main reduction gears; 2 × Propellers
- Speed: 11.6 kn (21.5 km/h; 13.3 mph)
- Range: 24,000 nmi (44,000 km; 28,000 mi) at 9 kn (17 km/h; 10 mph) while displacing 3,960 long tons (4,024 t)
- Boats & landing craft carried: 2 x LCVPs
- Capacity: 1,600–1,900 short tons (3,200,000–3,800,000 lb; 1,500,000–1,700,000 kg) cargo depending on mission
- Troops: 16 officers, 147 enlisted men
- Complement: 13 officers, 104 enlisted men
- Armament: Varied, ultimate armament; 2 × twin 40 mm (1.57 in) Bofors guns; 4 × single 40 mm Bofors guns; 12 × 20 mm (0.79 in) Oerlikon cannons

Service record
- Part of: LST Flotilla 6
- Awards: American Campaign Medal; Asiatic–Pacific Campaign Medal; World War II Victory Medal; Navy Occupation Service Medal w/Asia Clasp

USS LST-779 was a United States Navy LST-542-class tank landing ship used in the Asiatic-Pacific Theater during World War II.

== Construction and commissioning ==
LST-779 was laid down on 21 May 1944, by the Dravo Corporation, Pittsburgh, Pennsylvania. She was launched on 1 July 1944, sponsored by Mrs. Andrew Vavrek, and commissioned at New Orleans, Louisiana, on 3 August 1944.

== Service history ==
After a short period for final fitting out at the Naval Base at Algiers, LST-779 departed on 14 August 1944, for her two-week shakedown at St. Andrews Bay, Florida. The ship returned to New Orleans, via Gulfport, Mississippi, and Algiers, on 5 September, where she loaded her tank deck with heavy construction materials earmarked for forward areas. At New Orleans, she loaded five sections of Tank Landing Craft (LCT) on the main deck, made final checkups, met other logistical needs, and on 7 September, departed for the Pacific Fleet.

After transiting the Panama Canal on 18 September 1944, the ship steamed to San Diego, California, visiting Acapulco, Mexico, en route. On 8 October, LST-779 departed San Diego, unescorted, and arrived at Pearl Harbor, Oahu, Territory of Hawaii, on 18 October. Having unloaded the materials she carried from New Orleans, she undertook a period of intensive training with units from the US Army and Marine Corps in Hawaiian waters. It was not until January 1945, that LST-779 embarked her combat load of ammunition, gasoline, equipment, and marines of the 2nd 155-millimeter Howitzer Battalion, USMC and eight amphibious trucks (DUKW) from the 473rd Amphibian Truck Company (US Army). On 22 January, she departed Hawaii, setting a course for the Marianas.

=== Invasion of Iwo Jima ===
Operating as part of LST Tractor Group Charlie, Task Unit (TU) 53.3.8, LST-779 conducted a rehearsal off Tinian on 13 February 1945, and conducted two days of logistics at Saipan, from whence she departed on 15 February. She arrived off Iwo Jima at dawn on 19 February (D-Day). The tank landing ship moved to the task unit's position in area Charlie, 8,500 yd (7,800 m) from the beach. During that day and part of the next, she lay off the coast while the initial waves landed in smaller craft. Around 14:00, on 20 February, she moved in close to the beach and launched her eight DUKWs, and at 16:00, in response to a call by forces ashore for heavy artillery, she beached on Red Beach 1 at 16:34 and began unloading at 16:40. At 16:50 the ship's 40-millimetre (1.6 in) guns began engaging targets on Mount Suribachi. Five minutes later, at 16:55, the 40-mm battery ceased firing. By 04:00, on 21 February, the marines had unloaded all the heavy artillery on board, together with part of the ammunition and gasoline. At 04:25 LST-779 was straddled by heavy enemy fire. A Japanese mortar round hit a gasoline-laden tracked landing vehicle (LVT) within ten feet (three point zero metres) of the ship's bow, and the resulting explosion produced fragments that pierced the hull. At 04:43 the tank landing ship began to withdraw from the beach.

Afterward, Lt. Hopkins, LST-779's commanding officer, reported on board the amphibious command ship Auburn and conferred with Rear Admiral Harry W. Hill, Commander, Task Force 53 and his staff, who questioned him regarding beaching conditions, traction for vehicles on the beach, and the amount of cargo unloaded by his ship. Rear Admiral Hill also complimented LST-779's efforts as a job well done and ordered her not to re-beach until notified. From 08:00 until 18:00, the ship lay off Iwo Jima, near the line of departure taking LVTs and DUKWs aboard to unload powder and shells. During that time, at 15:00, she received orders to launch her pontoon barges. At 16:04, the first barge, no. 16, was launched and secured alongside, followed by the second, no. 14, which was secured forward of no. 16 at 17:06. At 19:23, sea swells and fresh wind caused no. 16 to puncture LST-779's hull just above the water line, allowing cresting waves to enter the hull. Conditions prevented the re-loading of the barges which were in danger of breaking loose as the manila lines and wire cables kept parting. On 22 February, at 01:03, both barges in fact broke loose and although the ship attempted to recover them, the efforts proved unsuccessful. Close to the line of departure at 09:33, the ship launched barge no. 13 and secured it to her starboard side. DUKWs began unloading ammunition off the bow ramp at 10:00. The barge put a small hole in the starboard side at 13:20. After being told to close in on Red Beach 1, the ship anchored 400 yd (370 m) off the beach awaiting orders. After shifting anchorage to 800 yd (730 m) off Green Beach, the anchor dragged and the ship remained underway the remainder of the evening maintaining her position off the beach.

==== Flag raising on Mout Suribachi ====
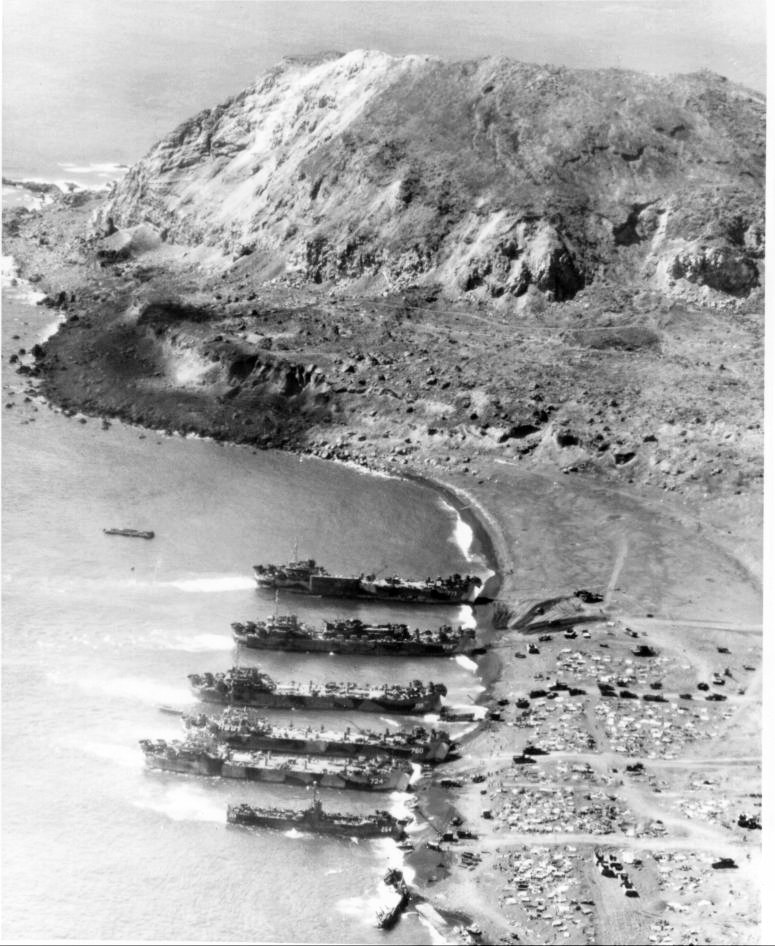
From top to bottom; USS LST-779, LST-808, LST-788, LST-760, LST-724, and LSM-264 beached at the foot of Mount Suribachi, Iwo Jima, 25 February 1945.

On 23 February 1945, LST-779 received order to beach on the left flank of Green Beach 1, at 08:30, and she did so at 08:42, and unloaded the remainder of her combat cargo. Throughout the day the beach party continued unloading the remainder of the 2nd Howitzer Battalion's ammunition. That same day units from the 2nd Battalion of the 28th Marines took the summit of Mount Suribachi, and erected an American flag tied onto a section of pipe found nearby. Lt. Col. Chandler W. Johnson, the battalion commander, deemed the flag too small to be visible to many of the marines fighting on the island. He told 2nd Lt. Albert T. Tuttle to go down to one of the ships on the beach and procure a large battle flag "large enough that the men at the other end of the island will see it. It will lift their spirits also." Tuttle hastened on board LST-779, beached near the base of the volcano, and obtained a larger set of colors. Tuttle, in turn, entrusted the flag to Pfc. Rene A. Gagnon, Lt. Col. Johnson's runner, to carry to the top of Mount Suribachi. It was the raising of that second flag that was documented by Associated Press Photographer Joe Rosenthal and SSgt. William H. Genaust, USMC, in their iconic images. An air alert sounded at 19:21, and the ship opened fire on enemy planes overhead from 19:25 to 19:35. Enemy aircraft were again fired upon from 20:00 until 20:10. The ship secured from general quarters at 21:00.

=== Continuing resupply ===
Unloading continued on 24 February 1945, until the end of the second dog watch. At 20:30, as the ship retracted from the beach, an air alert caused all ships to make smoke, obscuring the anchorage area and rendering maneuvering hazardous. LST-779 anchored 400 yards off Red Beach 1 at 20:49, and then shifted her anchorage to a position 600 yd (550 m) off Red Beach 1 at 22:45.

On 25 February, the ship proceeded on orders to the attack transport Harry Lee at 02:03, and moored on the latter's starboard side at 04:28. She then commenced onloading cargo until full at 11:11. She then proceeded toward Black Beach, where she beached at 11:36 and began offloading. Unloading completed at 21:15, and she retracted at 22:53. She then ran aground on an uncharted sandbar at 23:03. The ship continued maneuvering to come alongside Harry Lee from 23:50 until 02:45, on 26 February, as strong winds made it very difficult to do so. From 03:00 until 12:00, on 26 February, LST-779 continued unloading from Harry Lee. After clearing the attack transport, she beached on Black Beach at 13:32, and began unloading eight trucks, four trailers, and approximately 300 cases of ammunition. At 19:53 the cargo was unloaded and she retracted from the beach and maneuvered to moor alongside Bladen at 20:48.

On 27 February 1945, LST-779 cleared Bladen at 21:05, with a cargo of 42 vehicles, 120 tons of medical supplies and ammunition, 20 medical officers, and 162 men of the Medical Battalion, V Amphibious Corps. She continued maneuvering with great difficulty among the transports and other amphibious ships and craft close to the beach. As another tank landing ship took her position on the beach, LST-779 ran aground on uncharted sandbar. After some additional maneuvering the ship finally beached and began unloading at 01:40, on 28 February. She continued unloading her medical cargo until 15:00. Upon orders she retracted from the beach at 15:33 with mattresses plugging the holes in her hull to proceed to a convoy rendezvous for departure from the waters around Iwo. At 17:15 she joined the convoy proceeding to Saipan for repairs.

=== Operations at Okinawa ===
On 6 April 1945, after completion of repairs, LST-779 cleared the floating drydock ARD-25 and moored alongside another tank landing ship in Tanapag Harbor, Saipan. At 18:35, she embarked elements of the 20th Naval Construction Battalion (Seabees) with their heavy construction equipment and departed for Okinawa, on 12 April. She arrived there on 17 April. The ship landed at Kinmu Wan Bay, on the eastern side of Okinawa. All ships proceeded into the bay in single column and LST-779 anchored at 14:05. During the night the eight tank landing ships unloaded all their 3-by-12-foot (0.91 by 3.66 m) pontoon barges to create a "T-shaped" pier for unloading equipment. On 18 April, she got underway at 15:48, proceeding to within 1,000 yd (910 m) of Gushikawa, where she anchored. At 16:07, she secured from general quarters, and at 18:15 LCS(L)(3)-86 moored alongside and LST-779 supplied her with fuel, ammunition, and stores.

She beached at 10:40, on 19 April 1945, and then in attempting to moor at 11:08, caused damage to the bow doors. She successfully moored at 11:30, and began unloading at 12:01. At 12:27, LST-898 moored alongside, and by 20:45, all cargo and Seabees were ashore. The ship retracted from the beach and cleared LST-898 at 21:45, and anchored 2,000 yd (1,800 m) off the beach at 22:35. On 20 April, the ship got underway and while maneuvering between two tank landing ships, LST-779 grounded on an uncharted reef or rock. She made initial attempts to retract from this position that proved unsuccessful. Eventually, at 04:01, on 21 April, she ungrounded and shifted to an anchorage adjacent to the survey ship Bowditch. Later, maneuvering at various courses and speeds, the ship left Kinmu Wan, at 15:51, to form in a convoy as TU 51.29.19. This convoy of eight LSTs departed in formation with two submarine chasers as escorts for Saipan, at 17:05. After an uneventful six-day voyage from Okinawa to Saipan, the ship anchored in the outer Tanapag Harbor, at 10:45, on 27 April.

=== Supplying advanced bases ===
During the next few months LST-779 turned from landing on invasion beachheads to the job of supplying advanced bases. She remained at Saipan, from 27 April 1945, until she got underway bound for Guam, on 24 May. Arriving the next day she moored in Apra Harbor, Guam, at 12:26 next to LST-1083. She departed Guam, on 13 June, at 16:48, bound for Saipan, arriving on 14 June. She then got underway for Iwo Jima, on 16 June, with her tank deck loaded with aviation stores and four pontoon barges secured to her sides, and arrived at her destination on 19 June. Although Japanese planes managed to drop a few scattered bombs on the island, the ship emerged unharmed and continued to unload her cargo. As she attempted to retract from the beach, however, high winds and heavy seas caused by an approaching typhoon forced her to broach. With the assistance of the salvage vessel Safeguard, the infantry landing craft LCI(L)-1094, and three bulldozers, LST-779 managed to work herself free at high tide with only minor damage. She remained at Iwo Jima, until 28 June, when she got underway for Guam, arriving on 3 July.

=== Sinking of Indianapolis ===
At Guam, LST-779 loaded cargo and, with four powered pontoon barges manned by men of the 70th Naval Construction Battalion, departed at 15:30, on 27 July, bound for the Philippines, setting course to follow Convoy Route Peddie. While en route the ship's log noted that "at 1312" on 29 July, "Held general quarters to conduct firing exercises." Also traveling along that route around that time was the heavy cruiser Indianapolis. The tank landing ship arrived at Guiuan, Samar, Philippines, without incident on 1 August. The same could not be said for Indianapolis. Rear Admiral Charles B. McVay III, the latter's commanding officer, noted passing an unknown LST on 29 July. "We passed an LST headed toward Leyte, as we were also, on Sunday," McVay, later related in an oral history, "They were north of us and they were preparing to go further north to get out of our area to do some anti-aircraft shooting." That encounter was within 12 hours of Indianapolis being torpedoed and sunk with heavy loss of life by the Japanese submarine I-58, (Commander Mochitsura Hashimoto), at 00:14, on 30 July. LST-779 was likely the last American ship to encounter Indianapolis before her loss. Following her anti-aircraft exercises, the tank landing ship's deck logs indicated that she maintained a course slightly north of Peddie. That track, therefore, placed the ship well out of possible visual range of sighting any Indianapolis survivors in the water as she made her voyage to Samar.

=== Occupation of Japan ===
On 3 August 1945, LST-779 moved to Calicoan Island, Guiuan, where she took on cargo and then departed for Manicani Island, Guiuan, where she arrived on 6 August. The next day, 7 August, she moved to Lausan Bay, and then on to Guiuan, on 8 August. She departed for Manila, on 9 August, arrived there on 12 August, and remained there through V-J Day. On 26 August, she got underway for San Pedro Bay, Leyte, and reached her destination three days later.

On 3 September 1945, LST-779 was assigned to Tractor Group Baker (TU 54.6.2) to participate in lifting troops and equipment of the U.S. Sixth Army to Wakayama, Honshu, in accordance with the Fifth Fleet Eastern Occupation Group Plan. Getting underway from San Pedro Bay, at 17:50 on 4 September, the ships formed a three-column convoy of 25 LSTs and 15 LSMs for passage to San Fernando, Lingayen Gulf, Philippines, via Surigao Strait, Mindanao Sea, Sulu Sea, and the South China Sea. En route, she hit a submerged log on 7 September, that damaged her starboard screw.

LST-779 anchored in Lingayen Gulf, on 8 September 1945, where an inspection showed that the ship could continue on without further damage. After tests on 10–11 September, the ship embarked units of the US Army 60th Signal Battalion, at Lingayen Gulf, on 12 September, completing that evolution the following day. Having anchored awaiting orders to get underway, the ship departed Lingayen Gulf, and formed convoy en route to Wakayama, Honshu, Japan, via the Balintang Channel. The convoy formed into two columns to negotiate the narrow swept channel through Kii Suido, on 24 September, and the next day, 25 September, at Wakayama, carried out the initial landings in force on southern Honshu. After unloading on 29 September, the ship received tentative orders to return to Lingayen Gulf, to lift more occupation forces to Japan. She got underway the next day, 1 October, as part of LST Flotilla 13 (Commander, TU 54.18.21).

En route to Lingayen Gulf, the ship was detached from the convoy at 04:10, on 9 October 1945, in company with LST-1102, LST-565, LST-281, and LST-134, to proceed to Subic Bay, for repairs. She anchored in berth 73 at 09:52. On 14 October, the ship entered the floating dry dock ARD-12 for repairs to the damaged screw and shaft. With repairs completed on 16 October, LST-779 undocked and proceeded to the loading beach where she began embarking the men and loading the equipment of the 35th Fighter Control Squadron, USAAF. On 18 October, she got underway as a constituent of LST Group 41 (TU 54.15.15) in company with LST-565, LST-134, LST-281, and LST-612, to rendezvous with LST-864, LST-914, and LST-916 off Lingayen Gulf.

On 25 October 1945, she anchored at Sasebo, Japan, and completed her unloading three days later. LST-779 sailed to Nagasaki, on 1 November, and began loading upon her arrival on 2 November. She then made a short shuttle run to Takasu, with U.S. Marine occupation forces arriving on 5 November. On 14 November, the tank landing ship departed bound for a return to Leyte Gulf, to participate in the closing of U.S. Army bases and activities in the Philippines, and assembling surplus war equipment. She arrived on 20 November. The ship then moved on to the Guiuan Roadstead, on 27 November, and remained there until 2 December, when she moved on to San Pedro Bay, arriving on 3 December. LST-779 then departed for Cebu, Philippines, on 4 December, arriving the following day. The ship remained there until she departed for Batangas, Philippines on 11 December, arriving the next day. Having remained at Batangas, until 23 December, LST-779 then moved on to Cebu, where she arrived on Christmas Day. She then returned to Batangas, departing on 28 December, and arriving on the last day of 1945.

LST-779 remained at Batangas, until getting underway on 3 January 1946, for Cebu, where she arrived on 6 January. She then made a return voyage to Batangas, departing on 12 January, and arriving on 14 January. Departing Batangas, on 19 January, LST-779 set a course for San Jose, Mindoro, Philippines, and arrived there the same day, returning to Batangas, on 21 January. After a week's stay, she departed on 28 January, and arrived at Iloilo, Panay, Philippines, on 29 January. The next day, 30 January, she moved on to Manila, and then on to Subic Bay, where she arrived on 4 February. She then returned to Manila, on 17 February, making the voyage the same day. On 27 February, the ship departed the Philippines, bound for Okinawa, with a load of aviation supplies, standing in to Naha Harbor, on 3 March. She moved on to Buckner Bay, on 9 March, and while at Okinawa, received orders to return to the Philippines, for decommissioning. LST-779 sailed on 6 April, and arrived at Subic Bay, on 11 April.

== Decommissioning ==
LST-779 was decommissioned on 18 May 1946' and stricken from the Navy list on 19 July. On 5 December 1947, the ship was sold to Bosey, in the Philippines.

On 2 May 1951, the ship was offered back to the Navy in a letter from T.Y. Fong. That proposal, however, was turned down by the Navy on 18 May.

== Honors and awards ==
LST-779 earned two battle stars for her World War II service.

== Bibliography ==
- Havern, Christopher B. Sr. (10 February 2020). "LST-779". Dictionary of American Naval Fighting Ships. Naval History and Heritage Command.
- "USS LST-779". NavSource Online. 13 June 2019.
