= Santa Ynez (disambiguation) =

Santa Ynez (Spanish for Saint Agnes) can refer to:

== Places ==
- Santa Ynez, California, an unincorporated community in Santa Barbara County, California
- Santa Ynez Mountains, mountains south of Santa Ynez Valley
- Santa Ynez Unit, crude oil complex on Gaviota Coast, California
- Santa Ynez Valley AVA, California wine region in Santa Barbara County
- Santa Ynez Valley, a group of six communities located in Santa Barbara County, California

== People ==
- Santa Ynez Band of Chumash Mission Indians, a tribe of Chumash people located in Santa Barbara County

== Other ==
- Santa Ynez Apartments, off-campus apartments that belong to the University of California, Santa Barbara (UCSB) in the city of Goleta, California
- Santa Ynez Valley Union High School, a California Distinguished School located in Santa Ynez, California
- Mission Santa Inés, the 19th mission in the California mission chain located in Solvang, California
- USNS Mission Santa Ynez (AO-134), a United States Navy fleet oiler built during World War II

== See also ==
- USS Bowditch (AG-30), previously known as MS Santa Inez
