= William Ward Burrows =

William Ward Burrows may refer to:

- William Ward Burrows I (Marine lieutenant colonel) (1768–1805), second Commandant of the Marine Corps
- William Ward Burrows II (Navy lieutenant) (1785–1813), the colonel's son
- USS William Ward Burrows, a transport ship with the United States Navy
