= USS City of Dalhart =

Cargo ship of the United States Navy

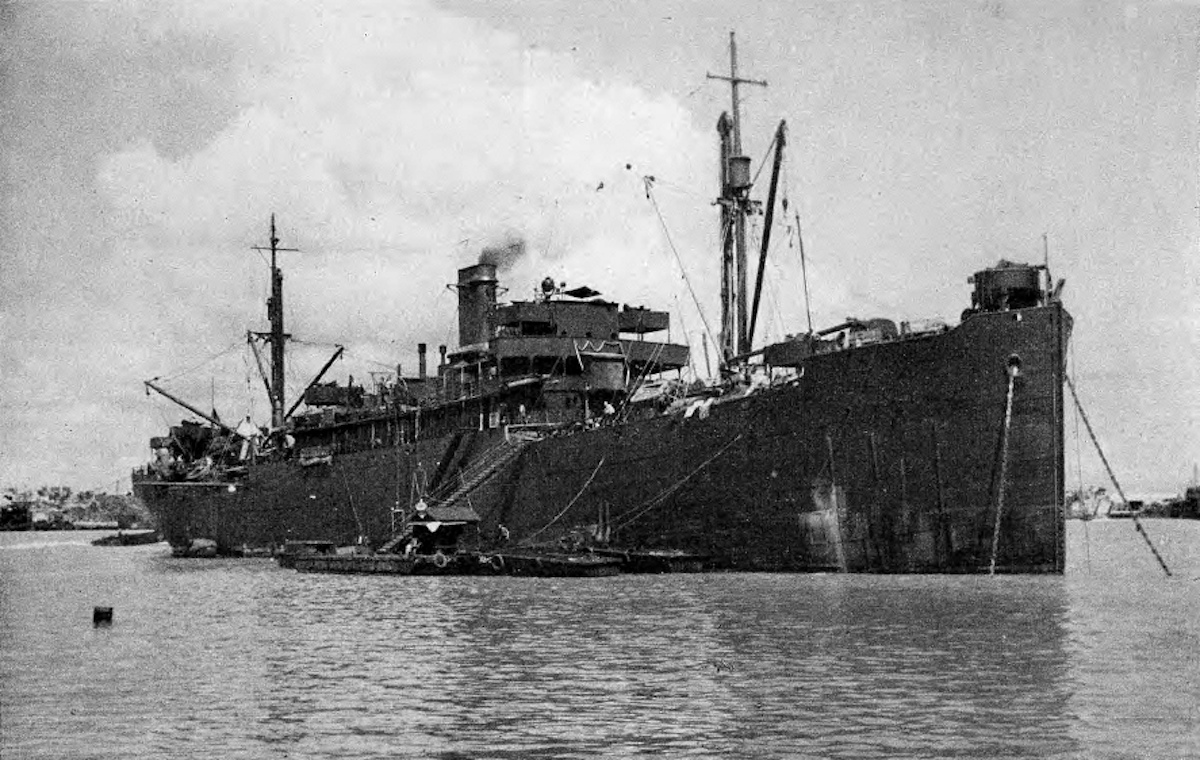
- USS City of Dalhart, HQ & base, 301st Naval Construction Battalion.

History

United States
- Name: City of Dalhart
- Namesake: Dalhart, Texas
- Owner: United States Shipping Board/U.S. Maritime Commission
- Builder: Oscar Daniels Company; Tampa, Florida
- Yard number: 9
- Launched: And delivered to USSB: 28 November 1920 (Note: The ship was launched and delivered the same day, apparently incomplete, as it was in the James River awaiting conversion from steam to diesel power and completion.)
- Acquired: 29 February 1944
- Commissioned: 2 June 1944
- Decommissioned: 28 January 1946
- Identification: Commercial: U.S. Official number: 221006; Signal MCJS

General characteristics
- Type: Design 1027 ship
- Tonnage: 5,841 GRT, 3,750 NRT; 5,878 GRT (1946); 7,400 DWT (type figure); 9,185 DWT (1946)
- Displacement: 8,747 long tons (8,887 t); 3,755 long tons (3,815 t) (light); 12,940 long tons (13,150 t) (full)
- Length: 416 ft (127 m) LOA; 401.9 ft (122.5 m) (registry)
- Beam: 54.2 ft (16.5 m)
- Draft: 18 ft 9 in (5.72 m)
- Depth: 31.3 ft (9.5 m)
- Crew: Commercial 1927: 45

USS City of Dalhart (IX-156) was built for the United States Shipping Board (USSB), delivered to the USSB in November 1920 and, after exchanging original steam engines with diesels, operated by the board's agents in Pacific trade until bareboat charter to the Navy in February 1944 by the War Shipping Administration (WSA) for the duration of the war. Commissioned 2 June 1944 and designated unclassified miscellaneous vessel IX-156 the ship served the remainder of the war in the western Pacific.

The ship was converted to accommodate 1,200 personnel and serve as the headquarters and forward base for the 301st Naval Construction Battalion ("Seabees") (NCB 301). The battalion was responsible for salvaging, clearing, and developing ports while fighting continued ashore. Its command and main contingent remained aboard the ship, while detachments opearated across the Pacific.

City of Dalhart served as the NCB 301 headquarters and main party "home" at Guam arriving at a long term anchorage 11 August 1944 just as the island was secured. With detachments on other islands the Seabees living aboard developed the harbor at Guam and began constructing a base ashore. After the battalion was fully encamped ashore a year later City of Dalhart departed Guam for San Francisco 22 November to be returned to WSA in December 1945, decommissioned in January 1946 and scrapped in January 1947.

== Construction ==
The ship was built for the United States Shipping Board (USSB) and delivered to the USSB 28 November 1920 by Oscar Daniels Company, in Tampa, Florida. The company built a ship designated Design 1027, standard cargo, Oscar Daniels type of which ten were built. The ship was apparently launched and delivered on the same day and not completed for some time. After delivery City of Dalhart, then a steam vessel held in the James River, was selected by the USSB to be converted from the delivered reciprocating steam engine to diesel power. Eight of the 7,400 DWT vessels delivered by the Oscar Daniels Company were among fourteen designated for conversion. Difficulty with foreign patents required new contracting for the engines and auxiliary equipment for full conversion to a motor ship.

According to Maritime Administration information the 5,878 GRT ship was completed 28 February 1921 and given official number 221006; however, it is not clear whether the new engines had been installed that quickly as they were being contracted for months before. The U.S. registry information for 1927 shows the ship with signal MCJS, 5,841 GRT, 3,750 NRT, registry length of 401.9 ft (122.5 m), 54.2 ft (16.5 m) beam, depth of 31.3 ft (9.5 m), 2,800 indicated horsepower, home port Tampa and a registered crew of 45.

Shipping reports show the MV City of Dalhart in the Pacific and Indian Ocean trade by 1928. On 21 February 1940 the Maritime Commission, owner of the ship, awarded United States Lines the routes and ships of the Commission owned American Pioneer Line. City of Dalhart was among the ships involved and awarded with a charter bid of $4,776.20 per month.

After tests on land the Brodie landing system was first tested in September 1943 for shipboard use with an installation on City of Dalhart. Staff Sergeant R. A. Gregory made ten successful takeoffs and hookups with a Stinson L-5 light plane.

== Navy service ==
City of Dalhart was acquired by the Navy 29 February 1944 under bareboat charter from the War Shipping Administration (WSA). Moore Dry Dock Company, Oakland, California, converted the ship into a barracks ship capable of supporting 1,200 men. On 2 June 1944 the ship was commissioned as USS City of Dalhart at San Francisco, California designated IX-156 to report to the Pacific Fleet.

City of Dalhart sailed from San Francisco 9 June 1944 for Pearl Harbor arriving in mid June. On arrival the ship became the forward base command headquarters, operations and administrative center and barracks ship for the 301st Naval Construction Battalion ("Seabees") (NCB 301) which was equipped for major salvage and harbor construction work. NCB 301 was one of the largest Seabee battalions and was first to be headquartered afloat and to be equipped with dredges. On 20 June 1944 NCB 301 was attached to Service Squadron (ServRon) 12 headquartered in USS William Ward Burrows as ServRon 12 flagship. Advance elements of NCB 301, arriving at Pearl Harbor 1 May 1944, had encamped at Aiea, Hawaii with detachments still in the Atlantic and others bringing large dredges to the Pacific areas. The battalion organized and awaited the ship that was to be its headquarters and base in advance areas.

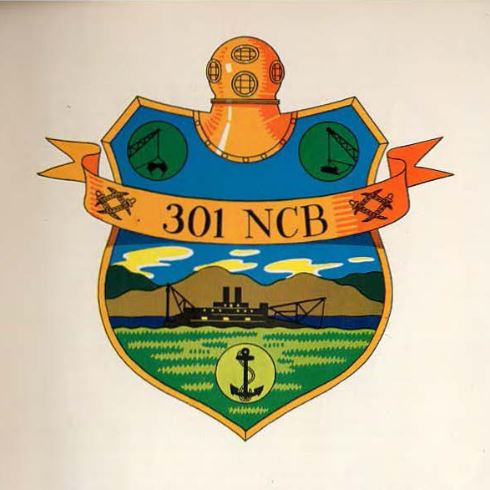
301st Naval Construction Battalion insignia.

On arrival the Seabees of the battalion at Aiea began further preparing the ship for use as their headquarters and home base. At the same time they were integrating with the ship's crew to begin working together on routine ship duties that included almost all such functions. At times more Seabees were assigned such ship operation functions than the total regular crew.

On 1 July 1944 the battalion, with the command already embarked in the ServRon 12 flagship William Ward Burrows, got a new Commanding Officer as Commander Fremont Elliott, USNR of the Civil Engineer Corps took command in a ceremony while in transit. The flagship was then heading to the Mariana Islands by way of Kwajalein and Enewetak to begin harbor clearance and development at Saipan. The flagship had arrived at Guam in the first days of August with the command and advance elements of NCB 301 to begin harbor clearance and development and await the arrival of City of Dalhart with other elements of the command.

As facilities and offices of NCB 301 were completed and after a flag inspection personnel of the battalion moved aboard piecemeal with those having duties or new offices aboard having priority. The ship's facilities provided all the necessities for the battalion and ship's company as well as some luxuries not normally available to NCB personnel in forward areas. A large laundry facility, barber, cobbler and tailor shops, a ship's store, small library and large sick bay were available. With the ship's evaporators operating at capacity fresh water was nearly unlimited with restrictions only occasional. After arrival at the permanent forward base at Guam an ice cream and flake ice machine were installed. The integration, including mess facilities, of previously land based Construction Battalion into ship operations was a successful experiment.

The battalion report for 1 June 1944 shows 14 officers and 736 men assigned to City of Dalhart as the battalion's 2nd Detachment embarked to join ServRon 12 in its area of operations. The 1st Detachment was at Midway Island operating a dredge there. The 3rd Detachment remained at Iroquois Point, Hawaii (Note: Site of a major Seabee base and an Advance Base Reshipment Depot (ABRD).) for transshipment of equipment and battalion support. Other detachments were assigned to dredges and to the Auxiliary Repair Docks ARD-16 and ARD-17 already in operation. (Note: The 7th Detachment was under orders to report to USS Alkes for transport and quarters.)

After several tentative movement orders City of Dalhart departed Pearl Harbor 16 July 1944 with men and additional equipment of NCB 301 aboard. The ship was held at Eniwetok from 3 August to 5 August awaiting the end of major Japanese resistance on Guam.

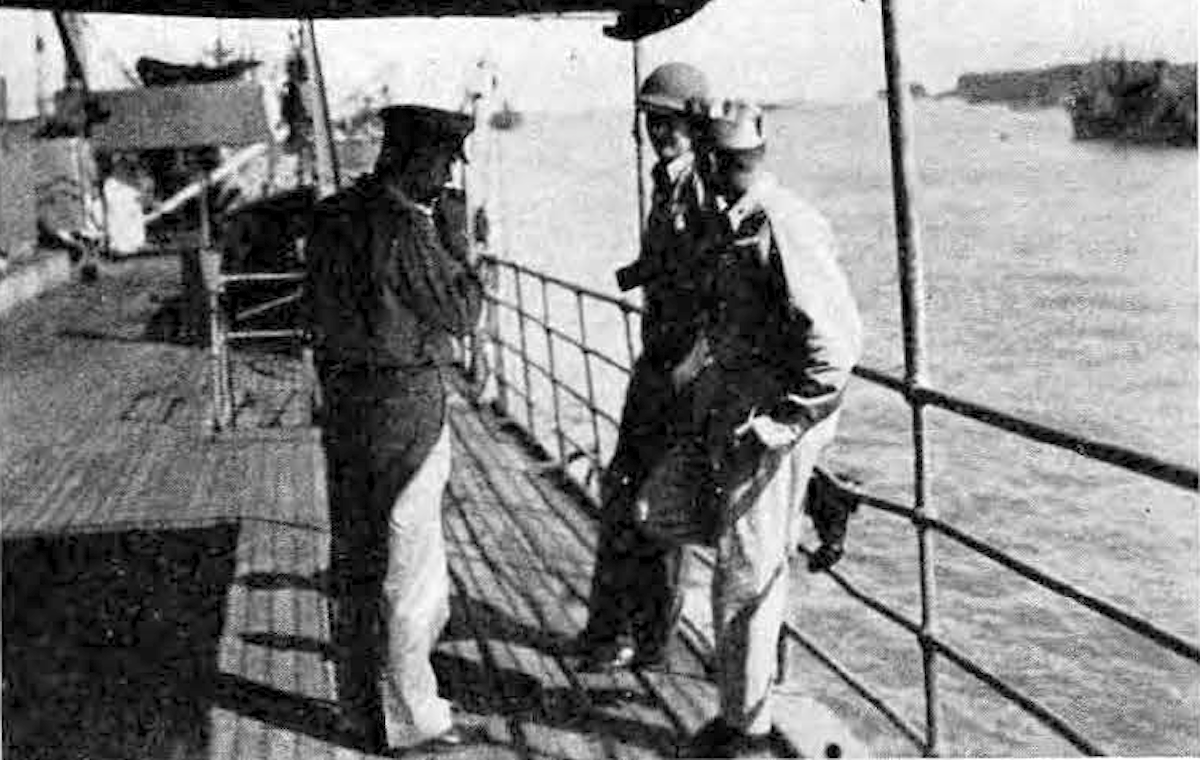
LCDR McKay (Executive Officer, NCB 301), LCDR Lokey (Captain, City of Dalhart) and CDR Elliott (Commander, NCB 301) meet on City of Dalhart boat deck, Guam anchorage.

City of Dalhart, leading a convoy of LSTs and service craft, arrived at Guam anchoring over the night of 10 August and moving on 11 August 1944, one day after the island was declared secure, what was to be a long term anchorage. William Ward Burrows, ServRon 12's flagship with the commanding officer of NCB 301 embarked, had arrived earlier and elements of the battalion were already engaged in clearing wreckage and developing an anchorage. The new base for NCB 301 joined that work immediately unloading equipment, putting the battalion dredges into operation and salvaging Japanese small craft for their own use. With clearance, blasting, dredging and land building Apra Harbor was created with the Liberty ship Geronimo being the first ship to enter the newly created inner harbor.

While at Guam the ship provided refrigerated fresh food to both fleet and harbor vessels as well as fueling several hundred ships and small craft with 5,962,406 gallons of fuel passing through the ship's tanks in the first nine months. Those vessels were also provided other stores and postal services by City of Dalhart.

As of 1 April 1945 of the 53 officers and 1,073 men of NCB 301 Headquarters only about 350 men were in a temporary camp ashore at Guam with the rest living aboard ship. By 1 July 1945 only 10 officers and 300 men were living aboard ship as a more substantial camp had been built ashore. The remainder of the battalion was detached aboard dredges and operating otherwise at Saipan, Tinian, Iwo Jima and Okinawa.

== Decommissioning and disposal ==
The ship sailed for San Francisco 22 November arriving 19 December 1945. NCB 301 had remained at Guam where it too was decommissioned 20 April 1946. City of Dalhart was decommissioned on 28 January 1946, and returned to WSA at Suisun Bay. City of Dalhart received one battle star for World War II service.

The ship was sold to Florida Pipe and Supply Company for $10,250 for delivery to be scrapped 22 January 1947.

== See also ==
- USS William Ward Burrows
- Seabees in World War II
- Apra Harbor

== Bibliography ==
- Pictorial Record, 30lst U.S. Naval Construction Battalion (April 1944 — December 1945) (PDF). 1946.
