= Brodie landing system =

Method of launching and landing light aircraft

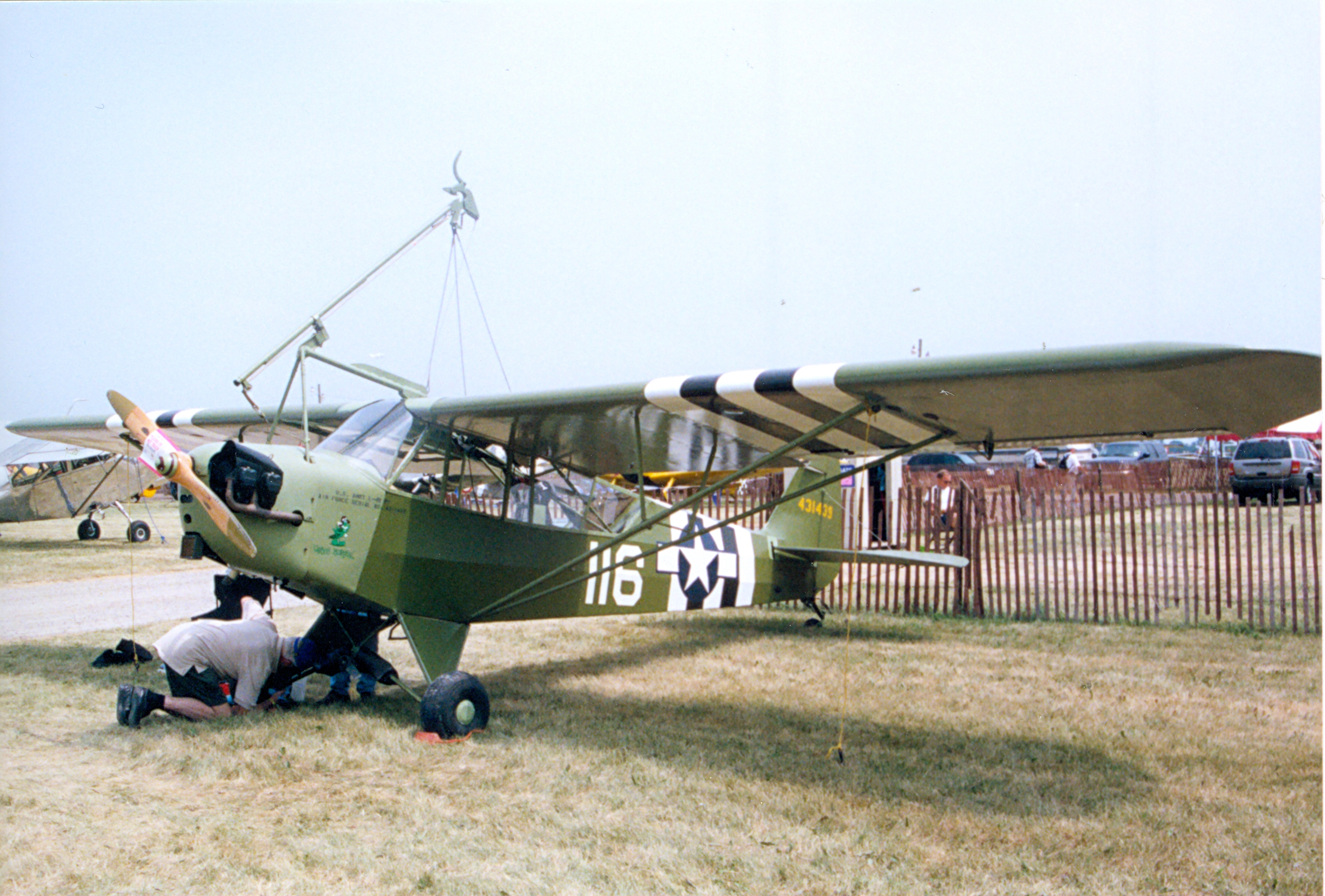
A Brodie hook mounted on a Piper L-4 Cub at Oshkosh

The Brodie landing system was a unique method of launching and landing light aircraft that was devised by Captain James H. Brodie, a member of the Transportation Corps who was later transferred to the United States Army Air Forces during World War II. The novel system involved catching an overhead hook attached to the plane with a sling, which itself was attached to a cable secured between towers and acted as an arresting gear. This system was originally envisioned to provide anti-submarine aircraft support for trans-Atlantic convoys, and for operating lightweight liaison aircraft in terrain normally unsuitable for runway construction, such as dense jungle or in the mountains. However, it was never employed in those environments due to its late adoption in the war. One of its perceived land-based qualities was that its small size would render it much harder to detect by the enemy than a conventional landing strip.

After a successful demonstration at Moisant Field (now New Orleans International Airport), the system was tested in September 1943 for shipboard use when it was installed on the motor ship City of Dalhart. Staff Sergeant R. A. Gregory performed ten successful takeoffs and hookups without incident with a Stinson L-5 Sentinel, but those operations were conducted under ideal weather and sea conditions.

The Brodie device was designed to allowed cargo vessels to be inexpensively converted with relatively minor structural changes so that they could launch and recover planes at sea. The system was used by the Navy for launching Marine Corps OY-1 Sentinels (a Navy version of the L-5) at Iwo Jima and Army Piper L-4 Cubs at Okinawa from LST-776. While the invention achieved moderate success, several OY-1's were lost due to pitching and rolling of the ship at sea. Concluding that the device was better suited for fixed installations on land, the Navy program was terminated in favor of CVE escort aircraft carriers that were allocated to carry liaison planes during the planned invasion of Japan.

Brodie and test pilot Flight Officer Raymond Gregory were awarded the Legion of Merit for their work on the system in 1945. Brodie envisioned scaling the system up to capture planes as heavy as 7000 lbs. He was issued US Patent # 2,435,197, # 2,488,050, # 2,488,051, # 3,163,380 for variations of the landing system.

== Operational history ==
- LST 776, LST 393, and LST 325 were outfitted with Brodie landing systems.
- The RAF used an L-5 for testing the Brodie system in India.
- One type of light aircraft which used the system was the Stinson L-5 Sentinel, an example of which is displayed in Brodie configuration at the Steven F. Udvar-Hazy Center museum in Dulles, Virginia.

== See also ==
- Merchant aircraft carrier
- Fighter catapult armed auxiliary ship
- CAM ship
- Aviation-capable naval vessel
- Aircraft catapult

== Bibliography ==
- Truebe, Carl E. (2012). "LSTs Equipped with the Brodie "Flycatcher" System". Warship International. XLIX (1): 29–30. ISSN 0043-0374.
- Brodie Aerofiles - A Runway on a Rope, Accessed 2 September 2005
