= USS William Ward Burrows =

Transport ship used by the US Navy during World War II

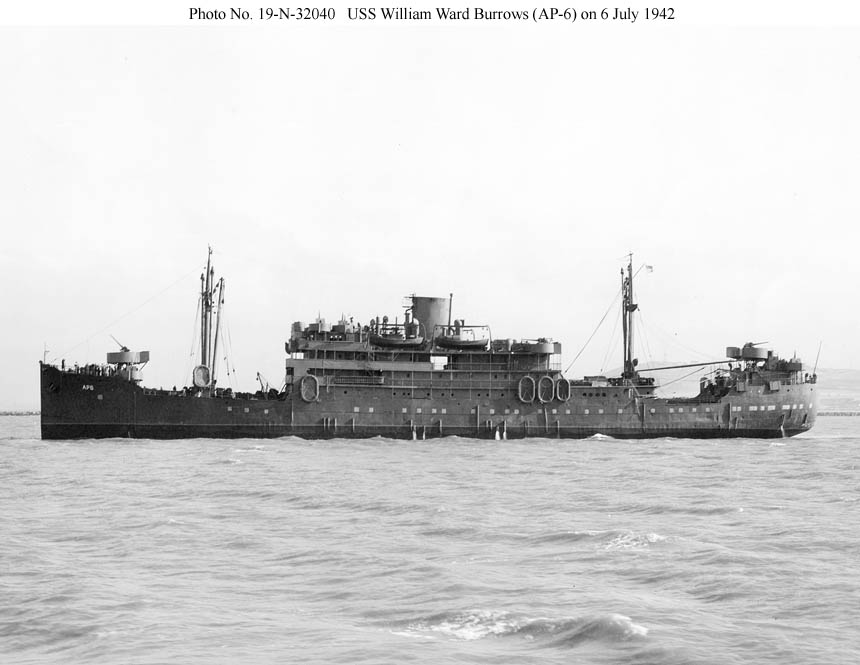
- USS William Ward Burrows (AP-6) on 6 July 1942. Her 3"/23 guns have been replaced with 3"/50 guns and the sponson in the forward well deck for the 50-foot motor launches has been removed. (Navy photo collection Photo No. 19-N-32040)

History

United States
- Name: Santa Rita (1929—1940); William Ward Burrows (1940-1946)
- Namesake: William Burrows
- Owner: Grace Steamship Company (1929—1940); U.S. Navy (1940-1946)
- Builder: Burmeister & Wain
- Launched: May 1929
- Acquired: (Navy) 6 February 1940
- Commissioned: (Navy) 15 May 1940
- Decommissioned: (Navy) 16 May 1946
- Stricken: 15 August 1946
- Identification: Commercial: U.S. Official Number: 228577; Signal: WIDG
- Honors and awards: Four battle stars for World War II service
- Fate: Sold for scrap, delivered National Metal & Steel 18 May 1957

General characteristics
- Tonnage: 4,576 GRT, 2,622 NRT
- Displacement: 8,450 long tons (8,590 t)
- Length: 386 ft 2 in (117.7 m) LOA; 370 ft (112.8 m) registry
- Beam: 53.2 ft (16.2 m)
- Draft: 9 ft 6 in
- Depth: 20 ft (6.1 m)
- Propulsion: 2 x Diesel, twin propellers
- Speed: 12.5 knots
- Capacity: Commercial: 80 first, 48 intermediate class passengers; 5,100 tons cargo
- Complement: 178
- Crew: Commercial: 80
- Armament: 4 × 3" guns; 5 × .50 cal; 4 × .30 cal machine guns

USS William Ward Burrows was a transport ship that saw service with the United States Navy in World War II. The ship was the former Grace Steamship Company liner MV Santa Rita by Burmeister & Wain and launched in 1929 at Copenhagen, Denmark.

As a Grace liner Santa Rita served the New York—South American West Coast trade from 1929 until 1939. After Navy acquisition the ship served in the Pacific. From October 1940 she assisted in the buildup of Central Pacific bases, being caught in transit from Hawaii to Wake Island when news of the attack on Pearl Harbor came. In April 1943 the ship became flagship for Service Squadron (ServRon) 12 which was engaged in salvage, harbor clearance, restoration and building in forward areas of the Pacific, often as combat continued ashore. The ship was associated with transport and serving as a base for elements of the attached 301st U.S. Naval Construction Battalion ("Seabees") (NCB 301) which was equipped for major harbor work. On 29 June 1946 the ship went into reserve at Olympia, Washington until removed for scrapping 18 May 1957.

== Construction ==
Santa Rita was a twin-screw, steel-hulled, passenger and cargo motorship launched in May 1929 at Copenhagen, Denmark, by Burmeister & Wain built for the Grace Steamship Company, Inc., and operated between New York and ports in South America and on the west coast of the United States, carrying passengers and freight. The ship was the second Grace Line ship of the name and two more would follow.

The design was for four passenger decks with accommodations for 80 first and 48 intermediate class passengers in beds rather than berths in all outside rooms. The recreational facilities included a swimming tank, golf practice area along with social hall, smoking room, lounge and verandah cafe. Cargo capacity was 5,100 tons handled by four extra large hatches and nine electric winches. Insulated chambers were provided for carrying of fruit and other perishables. The diesel engines driving the twin screws developed 4,500 horsepower for a service speed of 14 knots (16 mph; 26 km/h).

Santa Rita registry information (1939) shows the ship with U.S. Official Number 228577 with signal WIDG, 4,576 GRT, 2,622 NRT, registered length of 370 ft (112.8 m), 53.2 ft (16.2 m) beam and depth of 20 ft (6.1 m) and registered crew of 80.

== Commercial service ==
Santa Rita followed Santa Inez in inaugurating Grace Line's service between New York through the Panama Canal to Buenaventura, Colombia and Guayaquil, Ecuador, the first direct passenger service to those ports, with Santa Inez departing on 20 April and Santa Rita due to depart 8 June. The planned run between New York and Buenaventura was eight days and Guayaquil twelve days. After those initial ports the ships were to call at South American West Coast ports as far south as Valparaíso.

By September, 1932, declining trading conditions along the run from New York to Peru led to the announcement that the ships operating on the run, Santa Inez, Santa Olivia and Santa Rita, were to be withdrawn and laid up; however, they were put back in service the next year. In 1935 the growth in the fruit trade to the West Coast of South America resulted in fitting five of the line's vessels, including 55,000 cubic feet (1,557.4 m^{3}) in four compartments for Santa Rita, with York Ice Machinery Corporation refrigeration plants that included a patented system of air circulation developed by United Fruit Company.

In mid 1939 Grace Line announced it was trading in Santa Rita and Santa Inez as part payment to the Maritime Commission for two of its new C-2 type cargo ships. The ships were then to be bought by Navy for use as a tender for the Alaska air bases and the other as a survey ship. (Note: Santa Inez did become a survey ship. By the time of actual Navy acquisition of Santa Rita the threat of war in the Pacific had resulted in a major effort to develop bases on the mid-Pacific islands linking Hawaii and the Philippines and, as the threat in the Japanese Mandated Islands increased, developed into a South Pacific air ferry route. Santa Rita became quickly involved in those efforts until war actually came, cutting off the central Pacific routes to the Philippines. The replacement Santa Rita was completed 17 September 1941 and delivered to WSA by Grace 23 March 1942 for operation by Grace under an Army Transportation Corps agreement according to the MARAD Vessel Status Card. The ship was torpedoed and sunk 9 July 1942 in the Caribbean.) The ship went into the yard for drydock and general repairs at General Engineering & Drydock Company, Oakland, California for refit and was reported there in January and February, 1940 issues of a monthly trade journal. (Note: The January issue of the same reference shows the ship in the yard on page 90. A check of the same journal's December, 1939 issue for the same yard does not show the ship. Considering publication dates the January data was probably effective in December. The Navy acquired the ship 9 February at Norfolk, Virginia. Thus the probable West Coast yard period was December, 1939—January, 1940.)

== Navy acquisition ==
Santa Rita was purchased by the War Shipping Administration from Grace Lines for $511,513.11 on 6 February 1940 and simultaneously transferred to the Navy. The ship was placed "in ordinary," a non-commissioned status, as transport William Ward Burrows (AP-6) on 9 February at Pier 5 of the Norfolk Navy Yard, Portsmouth, Virginia. Converted to a troop transport at the Norfolk Navy Yard the ship was placed in full commission on 15 May 1940.

== Operational service ==
=== Pre war ===
After fitting-out, William Ward Burrows sailed from Norfolk on her maiden voyage on 6 July and proceeded to Weehawken, New Jersey, to take on a cargo of structural steel. Departing that port on the 15th, the transport embarked a company of marines as well as a group of women and children - naval dependents - for transportation to Guantanamo Bay, Cuba. After delivering her passengers, she touched at San Juan, Puerto Rico; Cristóbal, Canal Zone; transited the Panama Canal; visited Balboa, Canal Zone and the California ports of San Diego, San Pedro, Vallejo (the Mare Island Navy Yard); and the Naval Air Station at Alameda, before she proceeded on to her ultimate destination of Midway Island, where she dropped anchor on 2 October.

The ship began a series of voyages that formed part of the belated American attempt to fortify her outposts in the Pacific - islands such as Wake, Midway, and Johnston. William Ward Burrows carried the pioneer construction unit - 80 men and 2,000 tons of equipment - to Wake Island in January 1941, departing Honolulu the day before Christmas of 1940 and arriving at destination late in the afternoon of 9 January 1941.

William Ward Burrows would conduct eight more voyages prior to the outbreak of war in the Pacific, carrying construction employees, sailors, and marines, and the miscellaneous cargo necessary to sustain the outposts of the American defense system in the Pacific. On what proved to be her last pre-war voyage to Wake, the transport took westward a cargo of dynamite, as well as employees of civilian contractors and a sprinkling of Navy and Marine Corps personnel. In addition she towed Pan American Airways Barge No. 4 (PAB-4), laden with general cargo. She arrived at Wake on 11 November, disembarked her passengers, discharged her cargo, and delivered her tow before she headed back to Hawaii on the 13th.

Soon after arriving, she shifted to Honolulu and embarked 33 marines, 60 sailors, and 55 civilian contractor's employees for transport to Wake on the 28th. She got underway at 0825 on 29 November, towing PAB-7. The ship, herself, carried 1,819 tons of cargo - general supplies, lumber, "reefer boxes" (refrigerators), a boat, 10 trailers, and 20 tons of gasoline in tins.

Heavy seas and stormy winds prevailed for the entire passage but the ship maintained a speed of 5 kn (5.8 mph; 9.3 km/h) with PAB-7 in tow. On 5 December she rendezvoused with Sonoma (AT-12) taking on board an appendicitis patient from the Hawaii bound tug for medical attention. As the transport continued on toward Wake Island, the weather was "uniformly abominable".

The ship crossed the International Date Line on 6 December and accordingly set her calendars ahead to compensate. Unbeknownst to the solitary transport, a Japanese carrier task force was proceeding toward Pearl Harbor. On the morning of 7 December 1941 (8 December on the transport's side of the date line), that task force struck Pearl Harbor a devastating blow and plunged the United States into a war in both oceans.

=== War ===
At 0705 on 8 December the ship received word of the attack. The crew was called to general quarters, the captain set air and submarine watches with lookouts and gun crews alerted. Civilian workmen embarked on board immediately volunteered their services "in any capacity."

On 9 December the ship received orders to return to Honolulu with her loaded cargo and PAB-7. The war news she received was grim. Pearl Harbor had been attacked and Midway shelled (by the Japanese destroyers Ushio and Akebono). False sightings of Japanese task forces here and there proliferated. Comdr. Dierdorff later recalled: "As reports came in, the general impression we gained was that most of the Nipponese fleet was between us and Hawaii." He was not far from the truth.

=== Continued support of island bases ===
On 13 December, the transport received word to take PAB-7 to Johnston Island. Accordingly, the ship altered course and on 15 December delivered the barge with its general cargo and lumber embarking passengers for transportation to Hawaii. At 1340, William Ward Burrows' rudder touched a 3 fathoms (18 ft; 5 m) coral head in an area believed to have been dredged to a safe depth of 30 ft (5 fathoms; 9 m). The transport cleared the navigational hazard with only minor damage to the tip of the rudder.

William Ward Burrows remained at anchor to the south of Johnston Island that evening in an anchorage deemed safe from submarine attack. Comdr. Dierdorff posted full submarine lookouts, fully manned the bridge, and put the engine room on five minutes' notice to get underway. Squally weather prevented his using a 40-foot motor launch as picket.

At 1810, officer of the deck Ens. J. A. Peterson, USNR sounded the general alarm. A Japanese submarine, the I-22, had surfaced offshore and opened fire with its deck gun. (Other accounts attribute the shellfire to two surface vessels.) The shelling set fire to the island's powerhouse but caused no personnel casualties. One large shell struck 30 yards astern of William Ward Burrows with another passing over the forecastle and other splashes eruptingd from the waters between the ship and the island.

The enemy did not see William Ward Burrows which was carrying 227 passengers including 132 civilians. Knowing that his 3-inch guns were inadequate for a surface gunfire duel with ships of unknown size, Comdr. Dierdorff wisely decided not to open fire. Favored by darkness and rain squalls the ship got underway at 1830 and escaped toward Honolulu. By that time, the bombardment had ceased. At about 2330, Johnston Island reported no casualties and advised the ship not to return.

William Ward Burrows entered drydock on New Year's Day 1942 for repairs to her rudder and nine days later emerged to began loading cargo destined for Midway. The transport got underway on 18 January after embarking a draft of marines for transportation to the atoll. She arrived five days later and began working her cargo. Two days later, a Japanese submarine surfaced a mere mile away and began shelling the island. However, about three minutes later, fire from Marine Corps guns ashore drove the submarine away.

The ship soon headed back to Pearl Harbor arriving there on 3 February. Between early February and mid-March, she made two more round-trip voyages to Midway before she conducted an inter-island trip among the Hawaiian islands carrying general cargo and transporting Army troops to Hilo and Maui. She next voyaged to Midway, carrying general cargo, lumber, provisions, "reefer boxes", cable reels, and a two-ton truck while transporting naval and Marine Corps personnel. In mid-May, she returned to the west coast of the United States.

Following an overhaul at the Mare Island Navy Yard, Vallejo, California, the ship loaded to within 90 percent of her capacity with 1,437 tons of ammunition, lumber and other cargo departing San Francisco at 1053 on 23 July. The transport arrived at Pearl Harbor on the 31st and unloaded. The ship sailed with cargo for the New Hebrides at 1849 on 4 August.

=== The Solomons ===
Escorted by destroyer Flusser (DD-368) William Ward Burrows made Fila Harbor, Efate Island, on 17 August. The ship departed Efate on 26 August escorted by destroyer seaplane tender McFarland (AVD-14) headed for the Solomons. Destroyer minelayers Tracy and Gamble, and high speed transports Colhoun (APD-2), Gregory (APD-3) and Little (APD-4), as well as SS ''Kapara'' joined them the next day.

While passing through Indispensable Strait on the 29th, the ships received word from "Cactus," the codename for Henderson Field, Guadalcanal, at 1105 that an enemy air raid was imminent. While the APD's and DM's deployed to provide an antiaircraft screen around William Ward Burrows and Kapara, the transport prepared for action. At 1205 a formation of Japanese planes passed overhead at 25,000 feet. Two minutes later the ship opened fire with her 3-inch battery and expended 50 rounds. Seven minutes later, lookouts observed two enemy bombers falling in flames, due to the fire from the task group. The surviving enemy aircraft soon fled, having caused no damage.

The ship then arrived at Lunga Roads, (Note: Lungga Roads, Solomon Islands, 09°24′00″S 160°01′00″E.) off Lunga Point, Guadalcanal, and dropped anchor. She got underway for Tulagi Harbor that afternoon but ran hard aground on the southeast end of Sylvia Reef at 1750, only five minutes after entering the harbor channel. In an effort to get out of the predicament went full speed astern at 1752 and attempted to use her stern anchor as a kedge but the ship refused to budge. Little passed a towline to the transport at but darkness intervened keeping William Ward Burrows aground for the night. (Note: Sylvia Reef, Solomon Islands, 09°07′02″S 160°09′43″E.)

The next day the transport passed a line to the minecraft Tracy which began pulling with William Ward Burrows running engines full astern but the towline parted. During the time the transport's crew had begun unloading equipment into lighters in an effort to lighten the ship. At 1458, lookouts spotted 18 Japanese bombers - Mitsubishi G4M "Betties" - at 22,000 feet. Helplessly aground the transport was in a bad situation but the Japanese passed to other targets. They attacked Colhoun at 1512 after she had unloaded 17 tons of stores consigned to the Marine Corps garrison on Guadalcanal and, in two minutes, succeeded in scoring four direct hits. The fast transport sank by the stern at about 1515.

At 2035, 20 wounded men from Colhoun were brought on board the transport for medical attention. Reflecting later upon the incident, William Ward Burrows' commanding officer, Lt. Comdr. E. I. McQuiston, concluded that, had she not run aground, his ship, too, would have been at Kukum Point (Note: Kukum is now a suburb of Honiara. Military maps (Map No. V, United States Army in World War II, The War in the Pacific, Guadalcanal: The First Offensive by John Miller, Jr.) show it to lie just to the west of the rivers and streams at Lunga Point. The area is now identified as Leroy Wharf Port 09°24′48.6″S 160°01′04.2″E.) and probably would have been the object of the Japanese attack.

On the morning of the 31st, with engines at full speed astern, the ship made another attempt to get free. At 1100, she went to general quarters with word of approaching Japanese planes. Unable to maneuver and hard aground the ship was still in a vulnerable position but the air raid never materialized. Finally, on 2 September, with the aid of patrol craft YP-346 and YP-239 and with the destroyer minelayer Gamble the ship floated free. She remained anchored off Sylvia Reef to take stock of the damage and found it light. Gamble, however, soon reported a submarine in the immediate vicinity, and the transport got underway to seek safety in the inner harbor at Tulagi. The ship developed too much way to clear a patch of shoals and she grounded on Southern Cross Reef. (Note: Southern Cross Reef, Solomon Islands, 09°06′59″S 160°10′23″E.) Again the transport backed engines and Higgins boats pulled on the port quarter and pushed on the starboard side without success. That time aground was shorter than the first and on the afternoon of 3 September Gamble and YP-239 pulled the ship free.

After being refloated from Southern Cross Reef, the transport again got underway for Kukum Point to discharge part of her cargo. She then proceeded back to Tulagi to unload the remainder. Upon completing that task, she again headed for Kukum Point at 0545 on the 5th; she hove to at 0756 finding all available boats engaged in picking up the survivors from Little and Gregory, APD's that had tangled with a detachment of the "Tokyo Express" and been sunk by the gunfire of Japanese destroyers Yūdachi, Hatsuyuki, and Murakumo on the night of 4 and 5 September. As those boats passed his ship, Comdr. McQuiston invited them to come alongside and transfer the wounded to the transport. William Ward Burrows picked up 27 that morning and an additional 214 later, all for passage to Espiritu Santo. Her task completed at Guadalcanal the ship, escorted by Gamble, got underway at 1858.

At 0715 on 8 September, the transport dropped anchor at Segond Channel, Espiritu Santo, and later refueled from oiler Sabine (AO-25). After disembarking the APD survivors and discharging more of her cargo the transport took on passengers and light freight departing independently for New Caledonia on the 12th reaching Nouméa on the 14th. She continued her voyage through the Pacific war zone to Suva, in the Fiji Islands, in company with US Army Transport Ernest Hinds and escorted by destroyer Buchanan (DD-484). There, she brought on board more cargo and mail for delivery to Pearl Harbor. Sailing in company with Ernest Hinds and escorted by light cruiser Raleigh (CL-7) William Ward Burrows made port at Pearl Harbor on 28 September.

=== Island support and U.S. visit ===
She remained at Pearl Harbor loading cargo at both the Hickam Field dock and at the Navy Yard before sailing 4 October for the Fiji Islands in company with seaplane tender Tangier (AV-8) and escorted by destroyer Woodworth (DD-460). Upon arrival at Suva on the 15th the transport worked her cargo until departing on the 18th for Espiritu Santo where she arrived three days later.

Underway for New Caledona on the 27th, William Ward Burrows arrived at Nouméa the following day and unloaded her passengers and mail. On 14 November the ship departed for Samoa. Upon arrival, she discharged passengers and mail, picked up other passengers and then proceeded back to the Hawaiian Islands arriving at Pearl Harbor on 27 November.

The transport made one round-trip voyage to Midway and back before she shifted to the west coast of the United States for her second "stateside" visit since the war began. Arriving at San Francisco, California, on 2 February 1943, she spent the next few weeks exchanging cargoes and embarking passengers. She sailed for the Hawaiian Islands on 21 February in company with transport Henderson (AP-1) and escorted by destroyers Bulmer (DD-222) and Parrott (DD-218). The convoy, designated Task Group 15.6, ran into heavy weather on 25 February and for four days fought through mountainous seas with the ship occasionally taking water over both bow and stern and rolling very heavily in the rough seas and heavy swells. The convoy arrived safely at Pearl Harbor on 2 March.

The ship devoted most of 1943 to making inter-island transport runs, traveling among the islands of the Central Pacific, especially those of the Hawaiian chain. The most dramatic incident during this period of her service occurred on 6 November as she was approaching Midway toward the end of a run from Pearl Harbor. The ship's steering gear failed, and she was forced to lie to off the channel entrance until repairs could be made. Meanwhile, sub chaser PC-598 stood out of Midway to help protect the transport and joined PC-586 at 1418. At 2034, PC-598 reported picking up a submarine contact. A minute later, the transport went to general quarters. At 2040, PC-598 fired a floating flare to illuminate the area, and she commenced dropping depth charges a minute later. The transport, underway off the coast with PC-586 patrolling ahead, lost contact with PC-598 as that vessel went off to the hunt.

The next morning, with the danger passed and the steering casualty repaired, the transport entered the lagoon and began discharging her cargo. The ship remained at Midway from 8 to 10 November and soon set sail for Pearl Harbor, with PC-586 again as ocean escort. She made one more inter-island cargo-carrying voyage before she began her third run to the South Pacific.

The ship departed Pearl Harbor with a cargo of ammunition three days before Christmas 1943 escorted by PC-549 and PC-596. She traveled via Palmyra and American Samoa transferring mail to PC-596 on 30 December to deliver it to the port of Tutuila. The transport ultimately arrived at Havannah Harbor, Efate, at 0847 on 5 January 1944 and moored alongside the battleship USS Alabama (BB-60) where she supplied ammunition to the battleship South Dakota. After working cargo on board the battleship between 6 and 11 January, she proceeded to Espiritu Santo, where she discharged cargo between the 13th and 15th. From there the ship proceeded to Funafuti, in the Ellice Islands, the ship remained at that port for two days before she set her course toward Pearl Harbor and arrived there on 28 January. After repairs, the transport made two more voyages to Midway Island completing the second on 29 April.

=== Flagship ===
On return the ship became the flagship of Service Squadron (ServRon) 12, dubbed "the harbor stretchers" which was a harbor development and salvage command. ServRon 12 was responsible for clearing harbors in the forward areas making it possible to berth ships and bring supplies to the front-line areas at the earliest possible moment. Commanded by Capt. (later Commodore) Leon S. Fiske, ServRon 12 would play a part in the stepping-stone advance that eventually carried American forces to the Japanese home islands themselves. A major operating arm of ServRon 12 was the 301st U.S. Naval Construction Battalion (NCB 301) which was attached to the Squadron at Aiea, Hawaii. (Note: The base ship for NCB 301 was USS City of Dalhart which arrived at Pearl Harbor in mid June 1944 shifting to Guam arriving 10 August 1944 via Eniwetok.)

The ship, with a large detachment of NCB 301 embarked, got underway on 16 May 1944 in company with store ship Boreas (AF-8), Fortune (IX-146), and minesweepers Triumph (AM-323), and Vigilance (AM-324) arriving at Majuro lagoon in the Marshalls, on the 25th. Two days later, she shifted to Kwajalein. While at Kwajalein personnel of NCB 301 practiced diving on wrecks of Japanese dredges and trained new divers. NCB 301 underwent a change of command aboard as a new commanding officer, Commander Fremont Elliott, USNR of the Corps of Engineers, took charge.

The flagship of ServRon 12 in company with the survey ship Bowditch, the former Santa Inez that had been her running-mate and sister ship, departed Kwajalein bound for the Marianas via Eniwetok on 15 July escorted by destroyer Bancroft (DD-598). Aboard was the 10th Detachment of NCB 301 with four officers, 180 enlisted men and a large cargo of dynamite.

On 21 July 1944 lookouts in the ship sighted starshell and heard the sound of heavy gunfire from Saipan. Organized Japanese resistance on Saipan had ceased on the 9th but mopping-up operations by the American forces ashore continued. William Ward Burrows passed near Tinian on the 22d, observing from close-hand the preparatory bombardments paving the way for the landing of Major General Harry Schmidt's marines that would follow two days later. Late on the 23d, William Ward Burrows dropped anchor in Tanapag Harbor, Saipan where the first operation was unloading the cargo of dynamite. The ship was the base of operations for the harbor development unit and immediately began salvage and harbor development operations, providing water and stores to the various ships assigned to ServRon 12 as well as small craft from other units.

Her stay at Saipan was not without incident. On 30 July 1944, shortly after midnight, a tremendous explosion rocked the area; the concussion from the blast blew in the plywood light shields at the ship's hatches facing the island. Japanese infiltrators had detonated the cache of 84 tons of dynamite stored at the end of a coral pier. Boats from the ship put out to investigate, but could only ascertain that damage to the dump had been done, the two NCB 301 guards had disappeared in the blast and the presence of five Japanese bodies.

The following morning the ship disembarked the 10th Detachment of NCB 301 to continue harbor development work at Saipan. The ship then sailed from Tanapag bound for newly conquered Guam in company with cargo ship Vega (AK-17), landing craft repair ship Agenor (ARL-3), LST-431, and escorted by the destroyer Stockham (DD-683) and destroyer escort Tisdale (DE-33). After a one-day passage, William Ward Burrows dropped anchor at Apra Harbor and began unloading salvage equipment. Soon, various barges and other salvage craft were operating from alongside the transport which supplied them with water and stores as they worked on local harbor development tasks.

Commodore William M. Quigley, the new Deputy Commander, Forward Area, and his staff reported aboard on 18 August 1944. The ship's force immediately began constructing a wooden addition to the communication office on the promenade deck, port side. In addition, a voice radio and operations office was built on the port side of the gun deck. These alterations were made to help the ship fill her new role as the ship in which the Senior Officer Present, Afloat, (SOPA) was embarked.

William Ward Burrows soon resumed her work as base ship for harbor operations at Apra Harbor. She again supplied various ships and small craft with stores and water, until she detected a leak in one of her fresh water tanks. After patient searching, the ship's force found the affected area and soon repaired it. Shortly thereafter, Commodore Quigley and his staff disembarked and set up shop in the internal combustion engine repair ship USS Luzon (ARG-2).

William Ward Burrows next embarked the 9th Detachment of NCB 301, their equipment and took on board a cargo of dynamite that partially filled one of her holds. She continued the loading evolution until 2 October when she got underway in company with her escort, minesweeper Caravan (AM-157). Soon after they cleared the harbor the barometer began dropping steadily in a sign of an impending typhoon. The storm developed throughout the night and struck with full force the next morning. The ship continued through the storm ("like a sailboat between two mountains of water" as recounted by the ships' historian) with crew estimating winds of at least 85 kn (98 mph; 157 km/h). The ship suffered only minor damage with one life raft lost over the side. The flagship and Caravan continued their voyage joining the survey ship USS Hydrographer (AGS-2), auxiliary floating drydock ARD-16, and fleet ocean tug Pakana (ATF-108) on 4 October.

Altering course toward Ulithi Atoll the ship effected the necessary minor repairs of the storm damage before again getting underway on 9 October 1944 bound for her original destination, the Palaus. She hove to off Peleliu where fighting was still ongoing before unloading her cargo into amphibious trucks (DUKW's) and her dynamite cargo into an LCT so that NCB 301 could begin clearing a 2,000 ft (609.6 m) long, 200 ft (61.0 m) wide channel and harbor.

Five days after her arrival, William Ward Burrows shifted to a position between the islands of Bairakaseru and Garakayo, where she lay to, while a survey boat from NCB 301 took soundings of a nearby inlet in preparation for anchoring ARD-16. (Note: The 30lst Naval Construction Battalion was equipped with the necessary means of creating and maintaining harbors in forward areas. That included hydrographic survey engineers and equipment and a number of large dredges. The hydrographic survey group is described on pages 70-75 and the dredges are described in pages 17—38 of the reference cited here. Twelve large dredges are pictured. The Navy acquired commercial dredges and created the 301st to operate them.) The transport eventually moved to a spot between Angaur and Peleliu and hove to for the night. During her stay in the Palaus, several air alerts occurred, giving all hands some anxious hours; but the transport never sighted any enemy aircraft and continued her support duties, transferring navigational gear and buoys to Coast Guard seagoing buoy tender USCGC Papaw (WLB-308).

Departing Peleliu on 23 October 1944, William Ward Burrows headed back to the Marianas to resume her flagship duties for ServRon 12. En route, Caravan, again her ocean escort, made a contact on what she believed was an enemy submarine and made one attack. However, she lost the contact and eventually rejoined her charge and shepherded the transport safely back to Guam.

William Ward Burrows operated at Guam into the spring of 1945 until the invasion of Okinawa. The ship, escorted by minesweeper USS Sustain (AM-119), got underway for Okinawa on 30 May 1945 arriving on 3 June enterering Nakagusuku Bay (renamed by the Americans "Buckner Bay") with the second echelon of the 12th Detachment of NCB 301. As she steamed to her assigned anchorage, cleared by the first echelon which had arrived with the floating drydock ARD-28 with the bucket dredge YD-69 and barges in the drydock, the transport came under attack from a solitary "Jill" that roared down out of the clouds. Immediately, the ships in the anchorage blanketed the sky with antiaircraft fire and sent the "Jill" crashing about 1,000 yards from Burrows' anchorage. This proved to be only the first of almost continuous air raid "flash" alerts that would characterize the ship's sojourn in Okinawan waters. Five days later, she observed a kamikaze crash the destroyer minelayer J. William Ditter (DM-31), four miles away.

At 1908 on 11 June 1945 the transport was at general quarters and "on the lookout for low-flying bogies" when a "Jill" or "Sonia" was sighted off her port side at 1,500 feet. The transport and all of the other ships in the area immediately opened fire, "engulfing the plane and vicinity with tracer fire and shell bursts." The plane flew past William Ward Burrows, Bowditch, an LSD, and a Liberty ship, making a banking turn over the nearby Katsuren Peninsula crashing at 1911 about 700 yd (640.1 m) astern of Burrows.

The following day, the transport moved to the Yonabaru anchorage and began unloading equipment for the Seabee unit that had begun to establish camps on the beach. Air alerts continued almost ceaselessly, day or night, but unloading operations proceeded regardless.

After that period of work offshore the ship got underway and proceeded to Chimu Wan, an anchorage on the northward side of Buckner Bay, and dropped anchor there on 2 July 1945. Twice after the ship reached that body of water typhoons nearby forced her to get underway to seek maneuvering room in the open sea. On 19 July, for example, she sortied with LST group 35 (16 LST's and two LCM's) and remained at sea until the morning of the 21st. Air alerts continued to make life hectic almost until the end when Japan indicated a willingness to surrender and accepted the terms of the Potsdam Declaration on 15 August 1945.

=== War's end and deactivation ===
The cessation of hostilities did not mean an end to the ship's work with the ship participating in the occupation of Japan between 2 September 1945 and 26 January 1946. During that time, she successfully weathered another major typhoon in September 1945 without suffering major damage.

The ship sailed for the United States in the spring of 1946 reporting to Commandant, 13th Naval District, for disposition on 17 March 1946. On 16 May she was decommissioned and struck from the Navy list on 15 August 1946. William Ward Burrows received four battle stars for her World War II service.

== Lay up and disposal ==
On 29 June 1946 the ship, declared surplus, was delivered at Olympia, Washington to the War Shipping Administration and simultaneously delivered to the Maritime Commission reserve fleet for lay up. On 30 April 1957, after first bids were rejected as too low, the ship was sold to National Metal & Steel Corporation for $111,887.87 and withdrawn from the reserve fleet by the purchaser 18 May 1957 for scrapping.

== See also ==
- Arthur Foss (tug underway from Wake to Honolulu 7 December 1941)
- South Pacific air ferry route in World War II

== Bibliography ==
- Pictorial Record, 30lst U.S. Naval Construction Battalion (April 1944 — December 1945) (PDF). 1946.
- Maritime Administration. "Santa Rita". Ship History Database Vessel Status Card. U.S. Department of Transportation, Maritime Administration.
- Merchant Vessels of the United States, Year ended June 30, 1939. Washington, D.C.: Department of Commerce, Bureau of Marine Inspection and Navigation. 1939.
- Naval History And Heritage Command. "William Ward Burrows". Dictionary of American Naval Fighting Ships. Naval History And Heritage Command.
- "New Grace Liners for South American Service". Pacific Marine Review. 26 (June). San Francisco: J.S. Hines. 1929.
- Allen, William (1935). "Grace Installs Refrigeration for South American Fruits". Pacific Marine Review. 32 (August). San Francisco: J.S. Hines.
- "Trade-in Ships Bought by Navy". Pacific Marine Review. 36 (August). San Francisco: J.S. Hines. 1939.
- "Building in American Yards: General Engineering & Drydock Company". Pacific Marine Review. 37 (February). San Francisco: J.S. Hines. 1940.
- "Shipping News". The Seamen's Journal. 46 (September). San Francisco: International Seamen's Union of America. 1932.
- Swiggum, S.; Kohli, M. (26 March 2010). "Grace Line (W. R. Grace & Co.), New York 1882-1969". TheShipsList.
