= Stinson L-5 Sentinel =

1941 liaison aircraft family by Stinson

L-5 Sentinel
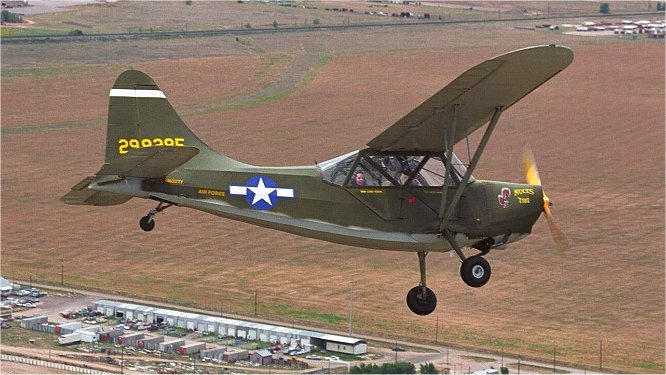

General information
- Type: Liaison aircraft
- Manufacturer: Stinson Aircraft Company
- Primary users: United States Army Air Forces, United States Army Ground Forces; United States Marine Corps; Royal Air Force
- Number built: 3,590

History
- Manufactured: 1942–1945
- First flight: 28 June 1941
- Developed from: Stinson Model 75B

The Stinson L-5 Sentinel is a World War II-era liaison aircraft used by the United States Army Air Forces (USAAF), U.S. Army Ground Forces, U.S. Marine Corps and the British Royal Air Force. It was produced by the Stinson Division of the Vultee Aircraft Company (Consolidated-Vultee from mid-1943). Along with the Stinson L-1 Vigilant, the L-5 was the only other USAAF liaison aircraft that was exclusively built for military use and had no civilian counterpart other than the prototype.

== Design and development ==
The origins of the L-5 can be traced to the prewar civilian Stinson HW-75. This 75 horsepower civilian high-wing design was built by the Stinson Aircraft Company at Wayne, Michigan and first flew in 1939. It was marketed as the Model 105 and was first introduced to the public at the New York World's Fair. The three-place HW-75 featured two side-by-side seats and a third jumpseat in back on which a small passenger could sit facing sideways. Economical, spin resistant and easy to fly, the plane was popular with aircraft owners and flight schools and by the end of 1939 Stinson was building three per day. In 1940 the Model 105 was upgraded to an 80 hp (60 kW) Continental engine and with other small improvements this was marketed as the Model 10.

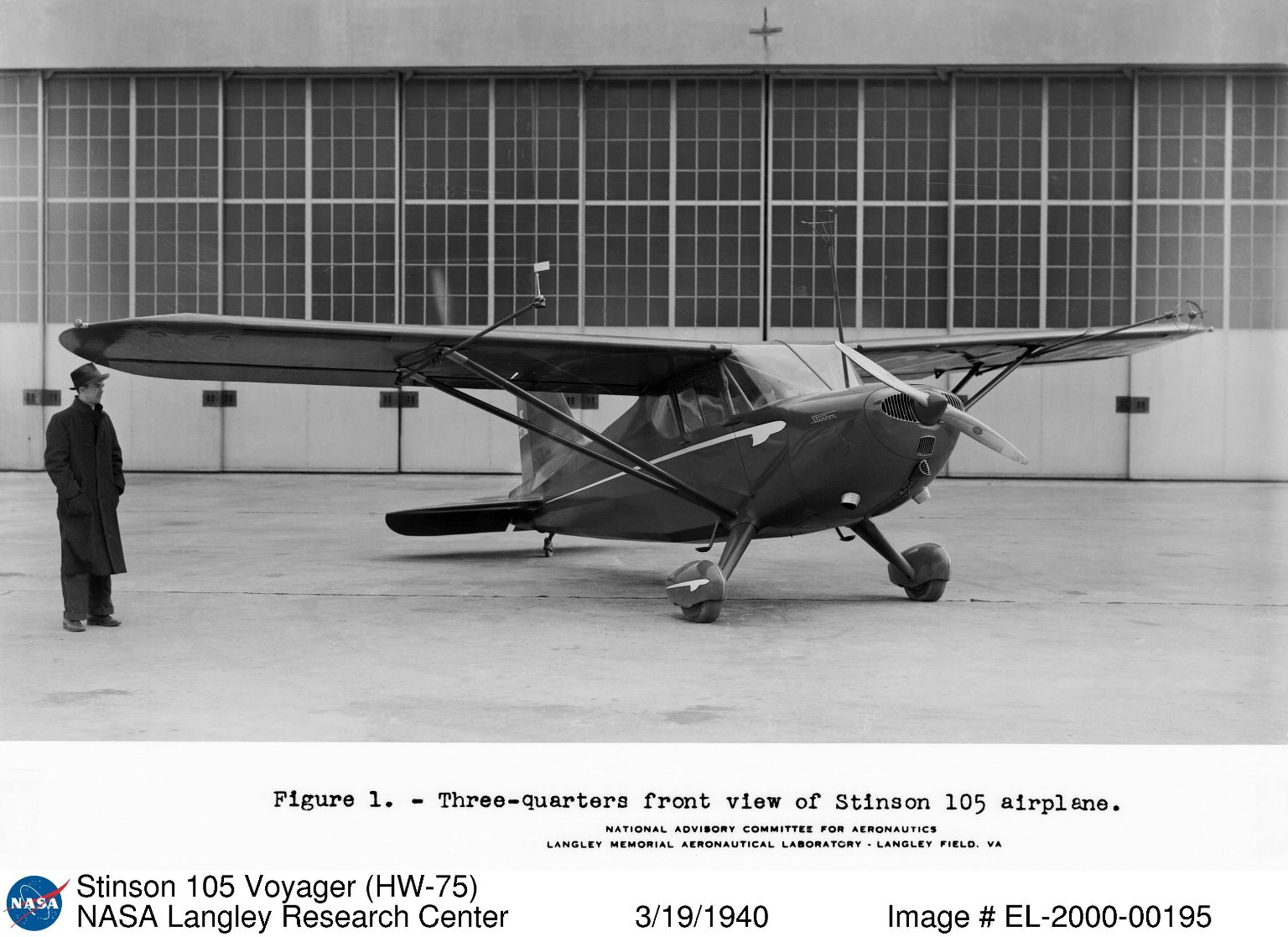
Stinson HW-75 (Model 105)

Stinson became a subsidiary of the Vultee Aircraft Corporation in August 1940. Under Vultee management, an improved version was fitted with a four-cylinder 90 hp (67 kW) Franklin engine for the 1941 model year and the type became known as the Model 10A Voyager. In the postwar era, the fuselage of the Model 10A was lengthened to accommodate four passengers and the four-cylinder powerplant was replaced with a Franklin 150 hp six-cylinder engine. This conversion became the Stinson Model 108 Voyager that was the only aircraft commercially produced by Stinson after WWII.

During the summer of 1940, Stinson built an experimental tandem-seat version of the HW-75, equipping it with a 100 hp (75 kW) Lycoming engine. This was known as the Model 75B. Under Vultee management it was re-designated V-75B. Soon increased to 125 horsepower for better performance, this became the Model V-75C that was demonstrated to the military in August and September 1940.

The V-75C failed to meet military requirements for performance and durability, so the Stinson engineers went back to the drawing board and came up with a clean-sheet design that was similar in concept to the V-75C but was a far stronger, more powerful and completely new tandem-seat airplane that met rigorous Army-Navy engineering standards for the design of military aircraft. This was called the Model 76 and was adopted as the L-5. (Note: Six stock Stinson Model 10's evaluated by the military as YO-54's in 1940 were unrelated to the development of the L-5.)

The experimental 175 hp Model 76, dubbed "the Flying Jeep" by factory personnel, was first flown at the Stinson factory airport on June 23, 1941, by chief pilot Al Schramm. Accepted by the military after accelerated service trials were completed in September, the first contract for 275 planes was issued in January 1942. Originally designated O-62 ('O' for observation), this was changed to L-5 Sentinel ('L' for liaison) in April 1942, seven months before the first production airplanes were delivered. With minor changes, the six-cylinder Lycoming O-435 engine was upped to 185 horsepower, becoming the O-435-1 that powered all production Sentinel models through the L-5E-1.

Adopted by the Army Air Forces as their standard liaison aircraft, replacing the larger and more costly L-1 Vigilant, the primary use of the L-5 was courier work, short range observation over friendly territory, and officer transport. The fuselage was reconfigured in June 1944 and the modified aircraft, designated as the L-5B, could be used as an air ambulance or for light cargo transport. With a wider and deeper rear fuselage section and a large rear door that folded downward, a litter patient or 250 pounds of cargo could be quickly loaded. Later iterations of the cargo / ambulance version were the L-5C with provisions for mounting a K-20 aerial camera, the L-5E with drooping ailerons for better low-speed control, the L-5E-1 with larger tires and heavy-duty brakes for better short and soft-field performance, and the final L-5G with a 24-volt electrical system and 190 hp version of the Lycoming engine. Each was similar to the previous model except for the changes noted.

In addition, L-5s were employed in roles such as artillery spotting, route reconnaissance, search & rescue, aerial photography, forward air control of fighter-bombers, laying communication wire, spraying pesticides, dropping para-cargo, dropping leaflets, and aerial broadcasting with loudspeakers. It also served as a test bed for radar tracking, firing aerial rockets, and airborne remote television. In uncommon instances, L-5 crews dropped grenades and fired wing-mounted bazookas at ground targets.

The L-5 series was manufactured between November 1942 and September 1945 during which time 3,590 of the unarmed two-seaters were delivered for military service, making it the second most widely used light observation liaison aircraft of the war behind the Piper L-4 Cub.

=== Construction ===
The fuselage was constructed using arc-welded chrome-moly steel tubing covered with doped cotton fabric while the wings and empennage were constructed of spruce and mahogany plywood box spars and plywood ribs and skins, also covered with fabric. The use of aluminum, which was in critically short supply and more urgently needed for other aircraft, was limited to the engine cowling, tail cone, framework for the ailerons, rudder and elevator and the landing gear fairings. The L-5 through L-5E were powered by a six-cylinder 185 horsepower (138 kW) Lycoming O-435-1 engine. The L-5G used a 190 hp Lycoming O-435-11.

== Operational history ==
Capable of operating from short unimproved airstrips, the L-5 Sentinel delivered personnel, intelligence and supplies to the front line. On return flights, wounded soldiers were often evacuated to rear area field hospitals for medical treatment. L-5s were primarily flown by the Army Air Forces liaison squadrons consisting of 32 planes each. One of these squadrons was attached to each field army headquarters deployed overseas and an additional squadron was assigned to each Army Group headquarters. They saw action in Western Europe, Italy, the Philippines, New Guinea, and the China-Burma-India theater. In the hands of the U.S. Marine Corps artillery observation squadrons they were widely used during the Pacific Island campaigns of 1944 and 1945. The L-5 was used by generals and other high-ranking officers for short-range transportation, saving hours of driving rough, meandering, or congested roads.

An unusual use of the Sentinel was launch and recovery from a land-based overhead cable system designed by Lt. James Brodie that could be quickly set up in a large clearing that was otherwise unsuitable for a runway. The cable was strung between two tall masts and a braked carriage snagged an arresting hook attached to the top of the airplane. After successful land-based tests of the "runway on a rope" by the Army in Louisiana, the Navy in California, and the OSS in Maryland, it was demonstrated to the British in India who declined to adopt it. However, the unorthodox "Rube Goldberg" Brodie landing system was installed aboard the USS City of Dalhart. Staff Sergeant R. A. Gregory made ten good launches and recoveries with a Stinson L-5. During the Battle of Iwo Jima, Marine Corps OY-1's operated from LST-776 which had been equipped with the "Brodie System". Later, during the Battle of Okinawa, Army L-4's flew numerous missions from the same vessel, discovering a flotilla of Japanese suicide boats before they could be deployed.

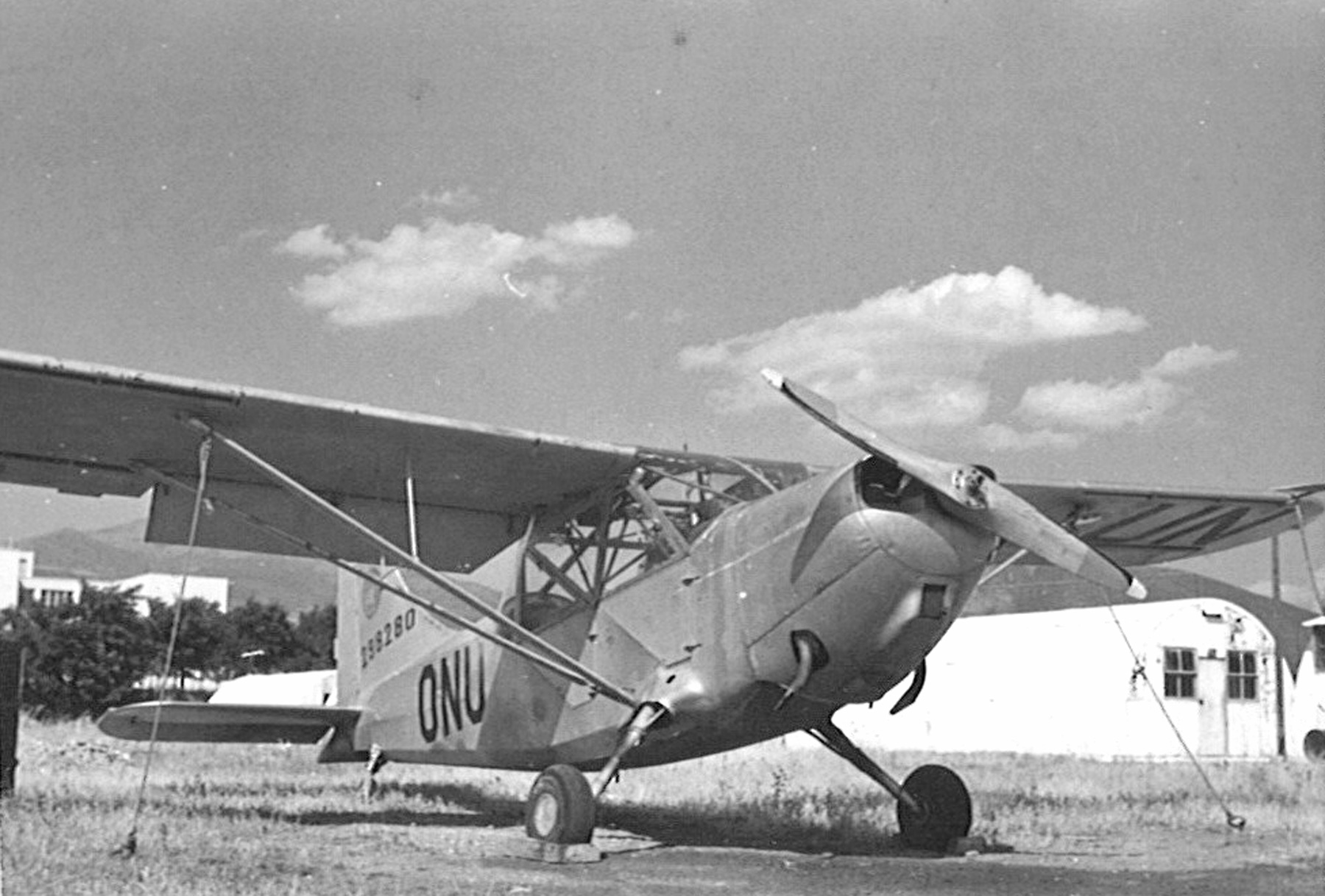
UN liaison service in Greece during the Greek Civil War

The Navy and Marine version of the L-5 through L-5E were designated OY-1, and all these aircraft had 12-volt electrical systems. The 24-volt L-5G became the OY-2. Neither the L-5G nor OY-2 saw combat during World War II because production did not begin until July 1945, just weeks before the war ended, but they were used extensively during the Korean War. A further two dozen or so OY-1's were converted to OY-2's in 1948 and 1949. The British Royal Air Force (RAF) procured 40 L-5s and 60 L-5Bs in 1944 and designated them Sentinel Is and Sentinel IIs respectively. These aircraft were used exclusively in the India-Burma theater of operations by SEAC communications and medical evacuation units.

After World War II, the L-5 was used in the continental United States, Hawaii and Alaska by the Civil Air Patrol for search and rescue work. They were also employed by state law enforcement, forestry and Fish & Wildlife departments. Many other countries also received L-5s after the war. The largest quantities were sold to Italy, the Republic of the Philippines, and India. A few went to Pakistan after the partition of India in 1948, and a small number were used by the Japan Defense Force. Others were also sold to Korea, China, Thailand, Mexico, Venezuela, and Brazil.

== Variants ==
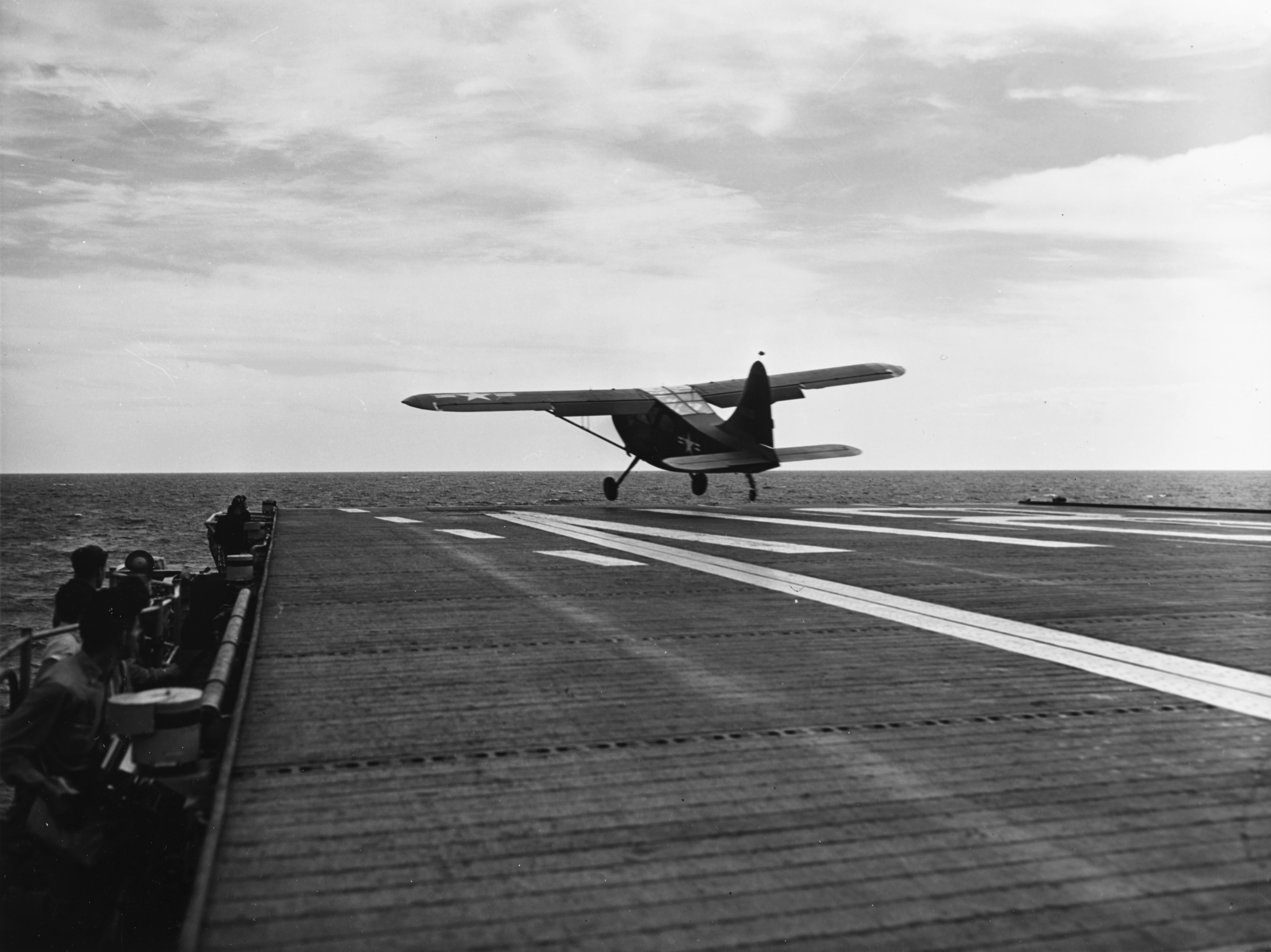
USMC OY-2 takes off from the USS Sicily, 1950

O-62
Original designation for the first contract for 275 aircraft. Changed to L-5 before any of aircraft were delivered.
L-5
Observation model used for artillery spotting and liaison work; 1,538 delivered, 82 transferred to the USMC as OY-1.
L-5A
Cancelled variant of L-5 with 24V electrical system. (Note: 688 examples falsely reported in 1944 by Jane's All the World's Aircraft to have been built.)
L-5B
729 delivered. Ambulance versions with large hatch to permit loading of a stretcher or cargo; twin-float capability; 60 transferred to RAF as Sentinel Mk II. 42 delivered to USMC as OY-1.
L-5C
200 delivered. Same as L-5B but equipped with a vertical mount behind the rear seat for a K-20 aerial reconnaissance cameras. 39 delivered to USMC as OY-1.
L-5D
Not adopted. No prototype built.
L-5E
500 delivered. Same as L-5C but fitted with manually drooping ailerons for better low-speed handling; 45 transferred to USMC as OY-1.
L-5E-1
250 Delivered. Included larger wheels and tires and heavy duty brakes for better off-field performance. 82 transferred to USMC as OY-1.
L-5G
Similar to L-5E-1 but with a 24 volt electrical system and SCR-622 radio package. Powered by 190-hp (142-kW) Lycoming 0-435-11 engine with improved cylinders and carburetor. 115 were built by end of the war and the contract for 785 others was cancelled. 18 delivered to USMC as OY-2.
XL-5F
One modified L-5B (44-17103) used to develop the 24-volt system used on the L-5G. Later, with modified greenhouse, served as prototype for unbuilt L-5H.

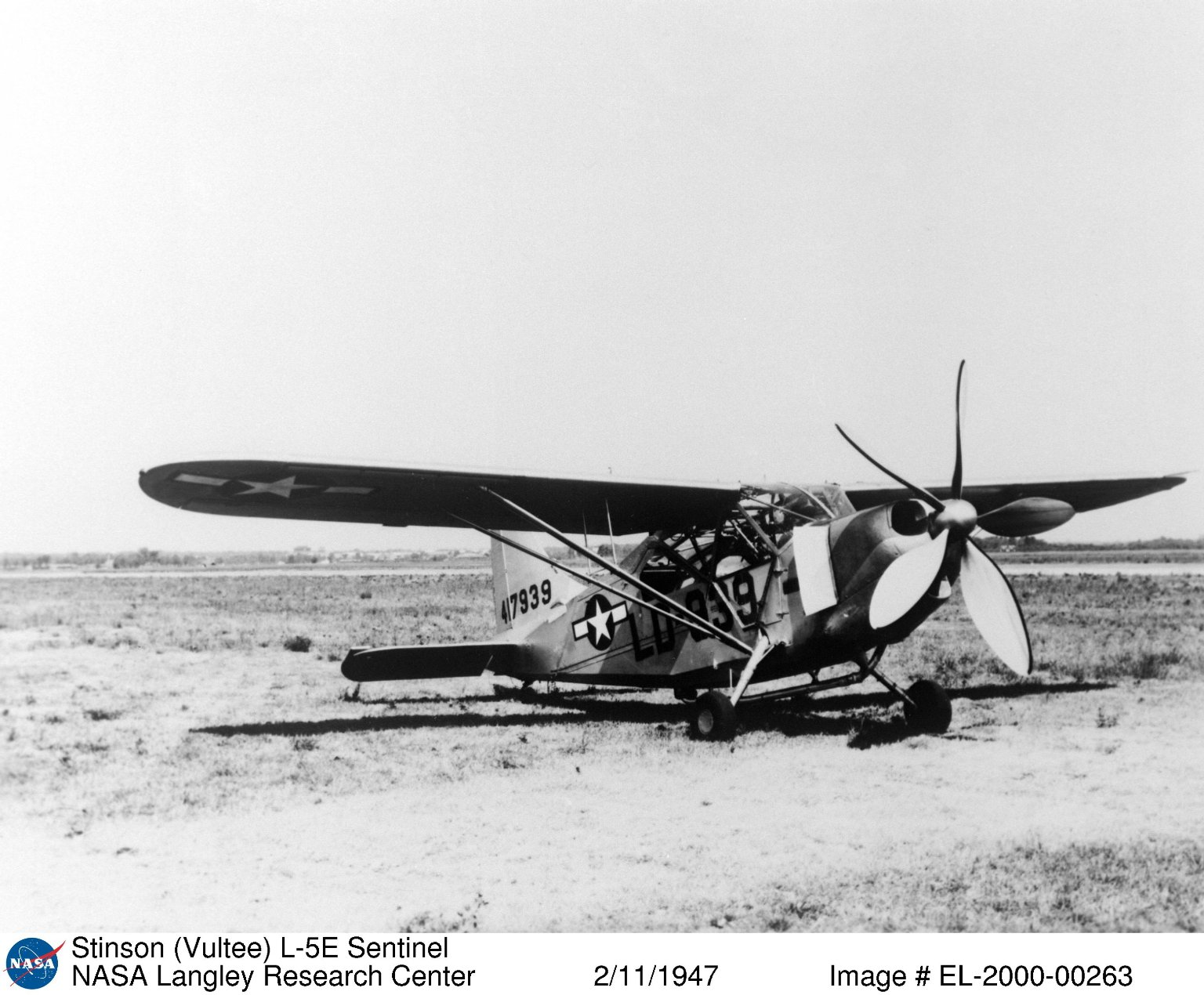
L-5E with "Quiet Flight" modifications at Langley

U-19A
L-5s still in service and redesignated U-19A by the USAF in 1962.
U-19B
Single L-5G redesignated U-19B in 1962. Used as a glider tug at the United States Air Force Academy and equipped with a Lycoming R-680 radial engine.
OY-1
288 L-5 through L-5E-1 transferred to the United States Marine Corps and United States Navy.
OY-2
18 transfers of L-5G to USN/USMC; 30 OY-1 conversions to 24V electrical system.
Sentinel Mk I
40 L-5s supplied to the RAF under Lend-Lease.
Sentinel Mk II
60 L-5Bs supplied to the RAF under Lend-Lease.
L-5/235
Civilian variant developed in Italy for glider towing, powered by Lycoming O-540-B, 235 hp (175 kW).
Clevenger
Approximately 20 L-5's converted to crop dusters by Clevenger Aerial Applicators of Salinas, CA. Equipped with Continental 220 hp radial engines, larger main and tail wheels, and fitted with lower wings and interplane struts to create a biplane. Operated at up to 3,800 lb (1,700 kg) gross weight in the Restricted category.
B.S.4
(Thai: บ.ส.๔) Royal Thai Armed Forces designation for the L-5 and L-5B.

== Operators ==
Australia

- Royal Australian Air Force – operated one L-5 Sentinel from 1944 to 1946, loaned from the USAAF.

Greece

- Royal Hellenic Air Force

India

- Indian Air Force

Indonesia

- Government of Indonesia – acquired a Sentinel during Indonesian National Revolution

Italy

- Italian Air Force - operated 119 Stinson L-5 Sentinel from 1946 until 1961.

Japan

- National Security Force
- Japan Ground Self-Defense Force

South Korea

- Republic of Korea Air Force

Pakistan

- Pakistan Air Force

Philippines

- Philippine Army Air Corps 1945 to 1947
- Philippine Air Force

Poland

- Polish Air Force

Republic of China

- ROC Air Force

China

- PLAAF

Thailand

- Royal Thai Air Force

United Kingdom

- Royal Air Force
  - No. 27 Squadron RAF
  - No. 117 Squadron RAF
  - No. 194 Squadron RAF

United States

- Civil Air Patrol
- United States Army Air Forces
- United States Air Force
- United States Marine Corps
- United States Navy

== Surviving aircraft ==
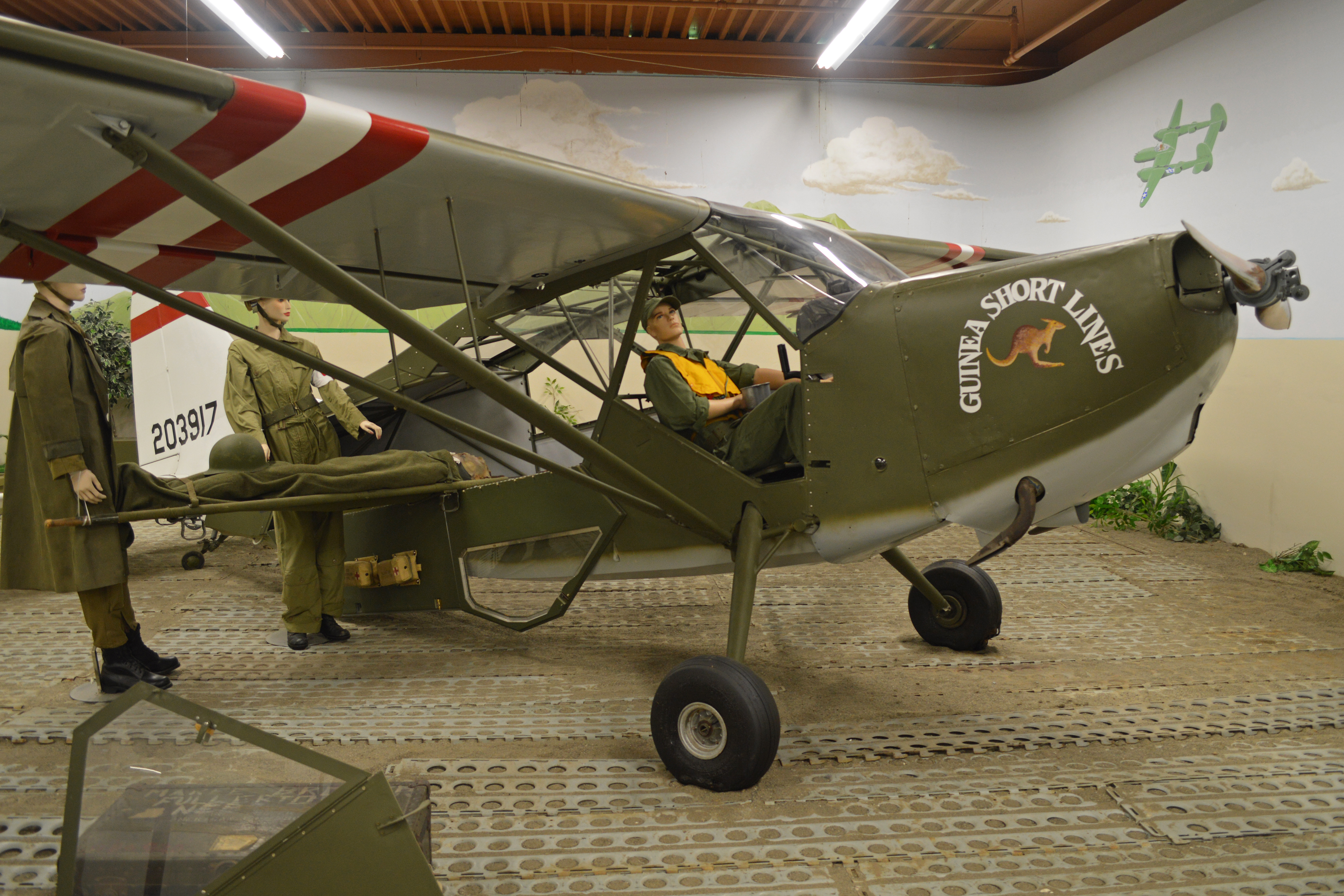
OY-1 on display at the Travis AFB Heritage Center

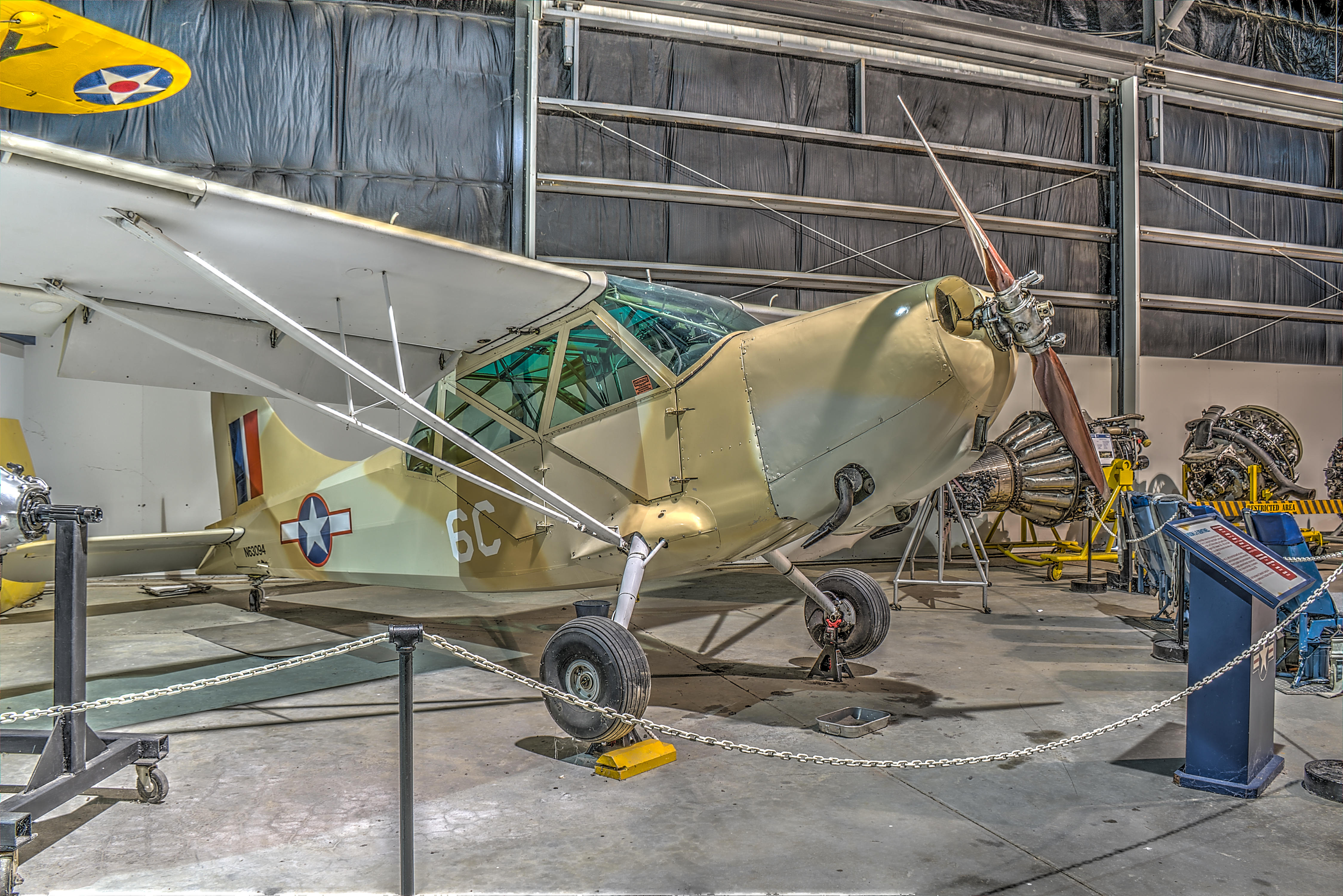
L-5E on display at the Museum of Aviation

Today there are about 300 known examples left worldwide and less than half are in flying condition. A group called the Sentinel Owners and Pilots Association is dedicated to the preservation and enjoyment of this aircraft type.

=== Australia ===
Airworthy

OY-1

- 03995 – Robert William Kemmis in Coolangatta, Queensland, Australia. This example was built for the USAAF but was delivered directly to the US Navy instead, serving until 1949.

=== Netherlands ===
Airworthy

L-5

- 44-17113 – Dutch Dakota Association in Haarlemmermeer, North Holland.

=== Poland ===
Static display

L-5

- 42-98643 – fuselage on static display at the Polish Aviation Museum in Kraków, Lesser Poland.

=== United States ===
Airworthy

OY-1

- 42-15060 – Commemorative Air Force FloriBama Wing in Pensacola, Florida.
- 42-98752 – Commemorative Air Force Capital Wing in Brandy Station, Virginia.

OY-2

- 44-18143 – Commemorative Air Force Lake Superior Squadron in Superior, Wisconsin.

L-5

- c/n 76-272 – Commemorative Air Force Dallas Fort Worth Wing in Lancaster, Texas.
- 42-98285 – Commemorative Air Force Dew Line Squadron in Amarillo, Texas.
- 42-98667 – Commemorative Air Force Minnesota Wing in South St. Paul, Minnesota.
- 42-99103 - on display at the US Army Aviation Museum in Fort Novosel, Alabama.
- 44-17543 – privately owned in White Hall, Maryland.
- 44-17588 – Military Aviation Museum in Pungo, Virginia.
- 44-17590 – Commemorative Air Force Central California Valley Squadron in Modesto, California.
- 44-17944 – George J. Marrett of Atascadero, California. On loan to the Estrella Warbird Museum in Paso Robles, California.

On Display

OY-1

- 03917 – Travis Air Force Base Heritage Center in Fairfield, California. It is painted as an L-5.

L-5

- 42-98184 – Museum of Aviation in Warner Robins, Georgia.
- 42-14798 – Steven F. Udvar-Hazy Center of the National Air and Space Museum in Chantilly, Virginia. This airframe is the first production L-5 and was donated to the museum on 5 June 1960.
- 42-14918 – Flying Leatherneck Aviation Museum in San Diego, California.
- 42-15046 – March Field Air Museum in Riverside, California.
- 42-98144 or 42-98453 – National Naval Aviation Museum in Pensacola, Florida.
- 42-98225 – National Museum of the United States Air Force in Dayton, Ohio.
- 44-17925 – Vintage Flying Museum in Fort Worth, Texas.
- 44-18010 – EAA AirVenture Museum in Oshkosh, Wisconsin.
- 45-35046 – South Dakota Air and Space Museum in Box Elder, South Dakota.

Under Restoration or in Storage

- 42-14934 – to airworthiness with the Commemorative Air Force Air Group One in El Cajon, California.

== Specifications (L-5) ==
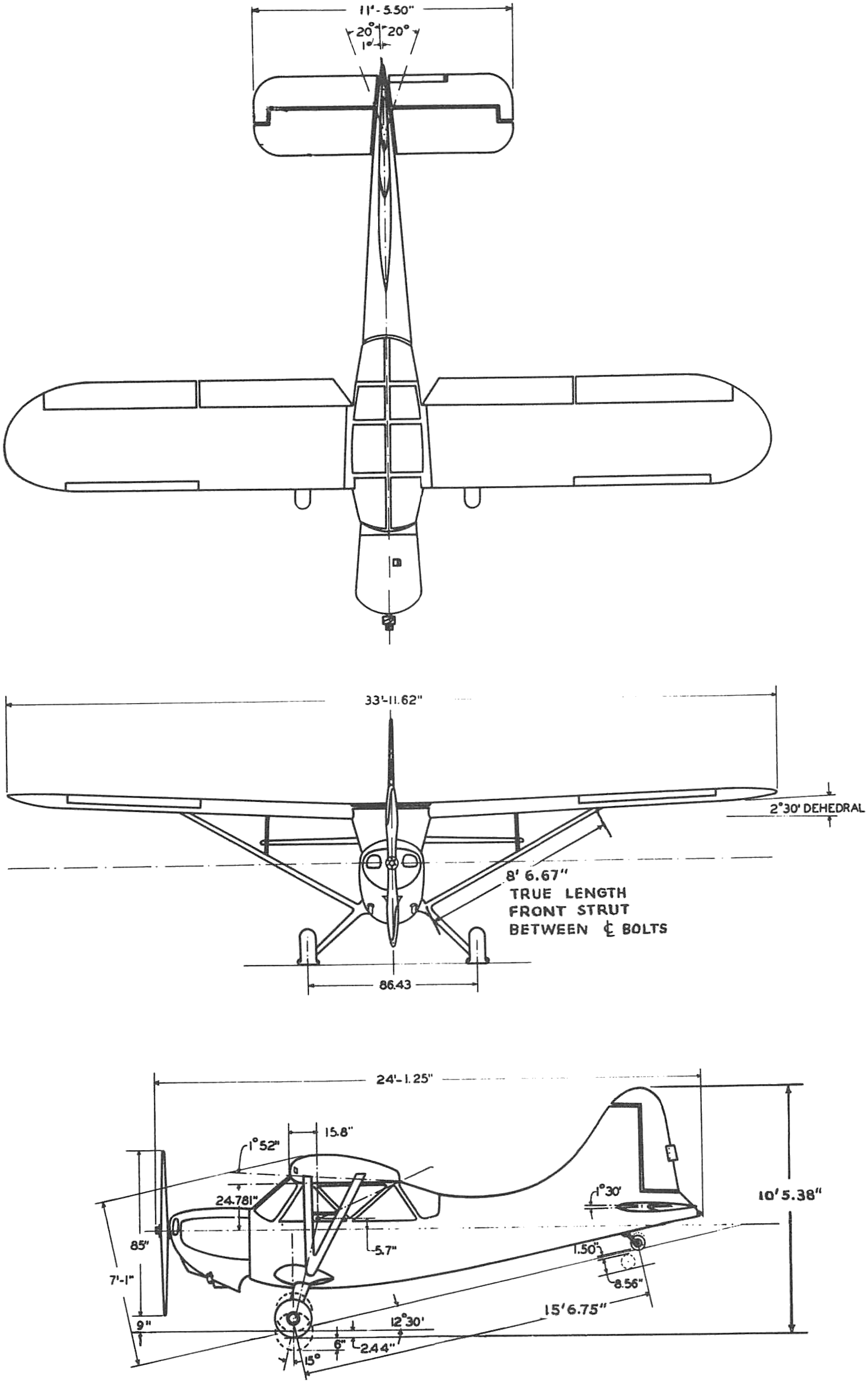
3-view line drawing of the Stinson L-5 Sentinel

Data from Stinson L-5 Sentinel

General characteristics

- Crew: 2 (pilot and observer)
- Length: 24 ft 1 in (7.34 m)
- Wingspan: 34 ft 0 in (10.36 m)
- Height: 7 ft 11 in (2.41 m)
- Wing area: 155 sq ft (14.4 m^{2})
- Airfoil: NACA 4412
- Empty weight: 1,550 lb (703 kg) approx
- Gross weight: 2,250 lb (1,021 kg) civilian limit
- Max takeoff weight: 2,250 lb (1,021 kg) civilian limit
- Fuel capacity: 36 US gal (140 L; 30 imp gal)
- Powerplant: 1 × Lycoming O-435 6-cylinder air-cooled horizontally-opposed piston engine, 185 hp (138 kW) (O-435-1) 190 (O-435-11)
- Propellers: 2-bladed fixed-pitch propeller

Performance

- Maximum speed: 130 mph (210 km/h, 110 kn) level flight
- Cruise speed: 100 mph (160 km/h, 87 kn) to 110 mph
- Stall speed: 42 mph (68 km/h, 36 kn) power off, 38 mph power on
- Never exceed speed: 200 mph (320 km/h, 170 kn) military limit, 163 mph civilian limit
- Range: 375 mi (604 km, 326 nmi) no reserve
- Endurance: 3.5 hours
- Service ceiling: 15,800 ft (4,800 m)
- Rate of climb: 900 ft/min (4.6 m/s) at sea level

== See also ==
Related development

- Stinson Voyager

Aircraft of comparable role, configuration, and era

- Fieseler Fi 156
- Piper L-4 Grasshopper
- Polikarpov Po-2

Related lists

- List of aircraft of World War II
- List of military aircraft of the United States
