= USS LST-565 =

1944 LST-542-class tank landing ship

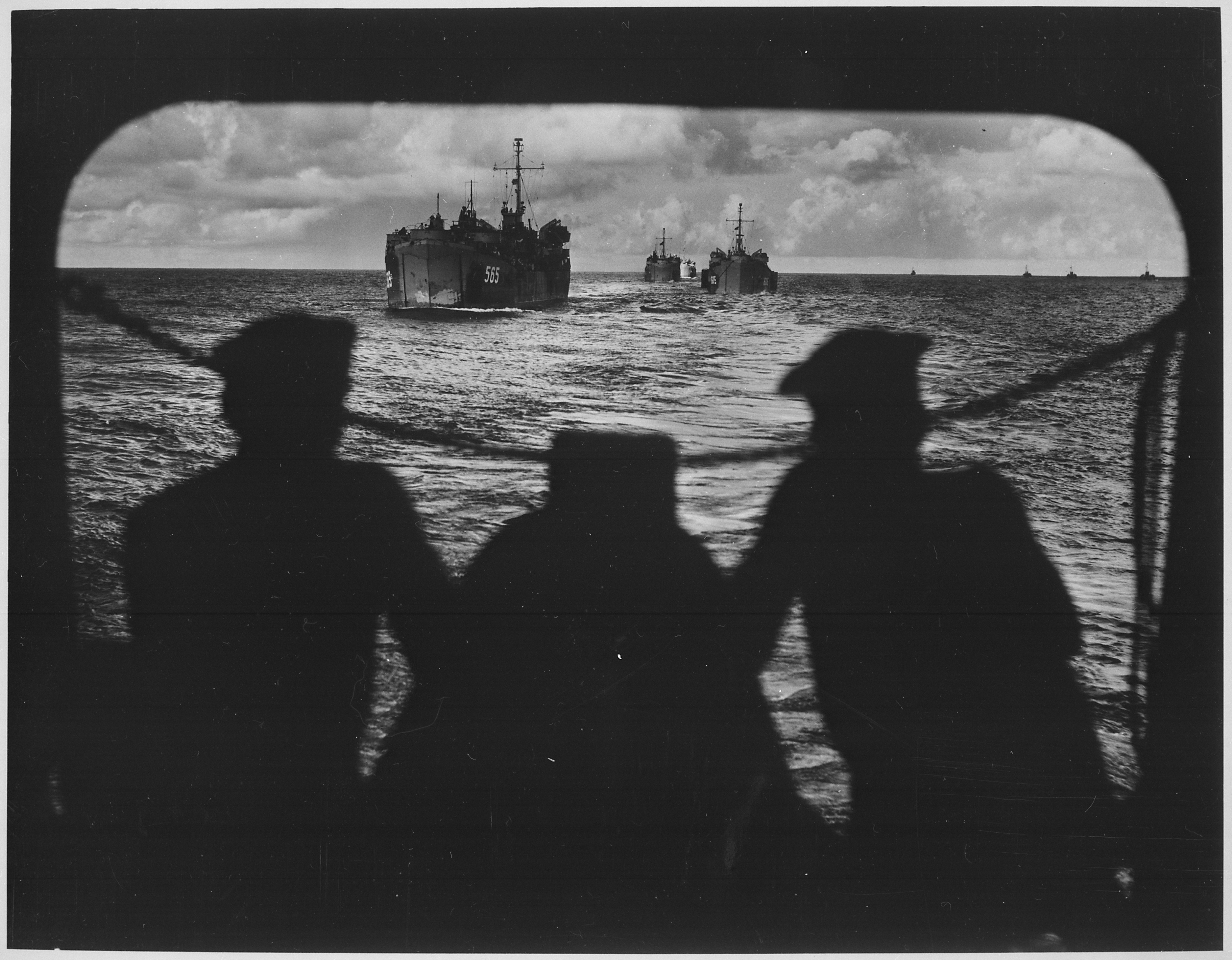
- LST-565 underway in September 1944, seen from another LST.

History

United States
- Name: USS LST-565
- Builder: Missouri Valley Bridge and Iron Company, Evansville, Indiana
- Laid down: 16 March 1944
- Launched: 8 May 1944
- Sponsored by: Mrs. Vergil P. Dyer
- Commissioned: 25 May 1944
- Decommissioned: 13 June 1946
- Stricken: 3 July 1946
- Honors and awards: Four battle stars for World War II
- Fate: Sold for scrapping 21 June 1948

General characteristics
- Class & type: LST-542-class tank landing ship
- Displacement: 1,780 long tons (1,809 t) light; 3,640 long tons (3,698 t) full load
- Length: 328 ft (100 m)
- Beam: 50 ft (15 m)
- Draft: Unloaded 2 ft 4 in (0.71 m) forward; 7 ft 6 in (2.29 m) aft; Full load: 8 ft 2 in (2.49 m) forward; 14 ft 1 in (4.29 m) aft
- Installed power: 1,800 horsepower (1.34 megawatts)
- Propulsion: Two 900-horsepower (0.67-megawatt) General Motors 12-567 diesel engines, two shafts, twin rudders
- Speed: 12 knots (22 km/h; 14 mph)
- Range: 24,000 nautical miles (44,448 kilometerss) at 9 knots while displacing 3,960 tons
- Boats & landing craft carried: 2 x LCVPs
- Capacity: 1,600-1,900 tons cargo depending on mission
- Troops: Approximately 140 officers and enlisted men
- Complement: 8-10 officers, 100-115 enlisted men
- Armament: 1 × 3 in (76 mm) 50-caliber gun mount; 8 × 40 mm guns; 12 × 20 mm guns

USS LST-565 was a United States Navy LST-542-class tank landing ship in commission from 1944 to 1946.

== Construction and commissioning ==
LST-565 was laid down on 16 March 1944 at Evansville, Indiana, by the Missouri Valley Bridge and Iron Company. She was launched on 8 May 1944, sponsored by Mrs. Vergil P. Dyer, and commissioned on 25 May 1944.

== Service history ==
During World War II, LST-565 was assigned to the Pacific Theater of Operations. She took part in the Philippines campaign, participating in the landings on Leyte in October 1944, the landings on Mindoro in December 1944, and the landings at Zambales-Subic Bay in January 1945. She then took part in the invasion and occupation of Okinawa Gunto in May 1945.

Following the war, LST-565 performed occupation duty in the Far East and saw service in China until mid-May 1946, when she departed for the United States.

== Decommissioning and disposal ==
After returning to the United States, LST-565 was decommissioned on 13 June 1946 and stricken from the Navy List on 3 July 1946. She was sold for scrapping on 21 June 1948.

== Honors and awards ==
LST-565 earned four battle stars for her World War II service.
