= USS Chimon =

Cargo ship of the United States Navy

History

United States
- Name: USS Chimon
- Namesake: Chimon Island, off the coast of Connecticut
- Builder: Missouri Bridge and Iron Works, Evansville, Indiana
- Launched: 10 January 1945
- Sponsored by: Mrs. O. Snyder
- Commissioned: 29 January 1945 as USS LST-1102
- Decommissioned: 21 November 1947
- In service: 27 December 1950 as USS Chimon (AKS-31)
- Out of service: 22 April 1958
- Renamed: Chimon, 1 February 1949
- Reclassified: AG-150, 27 January 1949; AKS-31, 27 December 1950
- Stricken: 2 November 1959
- Honours and awards: one battle star for World War II service
- Fate: sold, 2 November 1959; ultimate fate unknown

General characteristics
- Type: LST-511-class tank landing ship
- Displacement: 1,625 tons (lt); 4,080 tons (fl)
- Length: 328 ft (100 m)
- Beam: 50 ft (15 m)
- Draft: loaded bow 8 ft 2 in (2.49 m) stern 14 ft 1 in (4.29 m)
- Propulsion: two General Motors 12-567 diesel engines, two shafts, twin rudders
- Speed: 12 knots
- Boats & landing craft carried: 2 LCVP
- Troops: 140 officers and enlisted
- Complement: 8-10 officers, 100-115 enlisted
- Armament: one twin 40 mm bow gun mount, eight 40 mm guns, 12-20 mm guns

USS Chimon (AG-150/AKS-31) – also known as USS LST-1102 -- was an LST-511-class tank landing ship launched by the U.S. Navy during the final months of World War II. Chimon served as a transport and stores ship for the U.S. 7th Fleet, and was decommissioned after service in the Korean War.

== Constructed in Evansville, Indiana ==
Chimon was launched as LST-1102 10 January 1945 by Missouri Valley Bridge and Iron Works, Evansville, Indiana; sponsored by Mrs. O. Snyder; and commissioned 29 January 1945.

== World War II-related service ==
Sailing from Gulfport, Mississippi, 7 March 1945, LST-1102 arrived at Pearl Harbor 4 April to load cargo for delivery to bases at Kwajalein, Eniwetok, and Ulithi.

This duty completed, she joined a convoy at Leyte 21 June and arrived at Okinawa 5 days later to complete offloading her cargo. After transporting Marines from Naha to Hagushi, she sailed from Okinawa 10 July and returned to Pearl Harbor 5 August. At the close of the war, she loaded men and equipment for the occupation of Japan, and on 27 September arrived at Wakayama, Japan.

LST-1102 continued to support the occupation of Japan until 4 November 1945. She called at Guam to embark homeward bound servicemen and arrived back at Pearl Harbor 1 December to undergo conversion to a mobile spare parts ship.

== Converted into a spare parts ship ==
Her conversion completed, LST-1102 got underway from Pearl Harbor 4 April 1946 to return to Far Eastern duty at Shanghai, and Qingdao, China until 8 October 1947. Arriving at San Pedro, California, 7 November, she shifted to San Diego, California, a week later and was placed out of commission in reserve there 21 November 1947.

She was reclassified AG-150, 27 January 1949 and assigned the name Chimon on 1 February 1949.

== Korean War service ==
Recommissioned 27 December 1950 Chimon was assigned to Service Squadron 3 and sailed for the Far East on 2 May 1951. Arriving at Sasebo, Japan, 13 June, she alternated operations from that port and Yokosuka in support of the Korean War.

Reclassified AKS-31 on 18 August 1951, she remained in the Far East serving the 7th Fleet in its watchful operations to keep peace until 20 November 1957, occasionally visiting Hong Kong and the Philippines.

== Post-war decommissioning ==
Arriving at San Francisco, California, 22 December, Chimon was placed in commission in reserve 22 January 1958 and out of commission in reserve 22 April 1958. Chimon was sold, and removed from naval custody on 2 November 1959.

== Honors and awards ==
Chimon received one battle star (as LST-1102) for World War II service.
