= USS LST-916 =

1944 LST-542-class tank landing ship

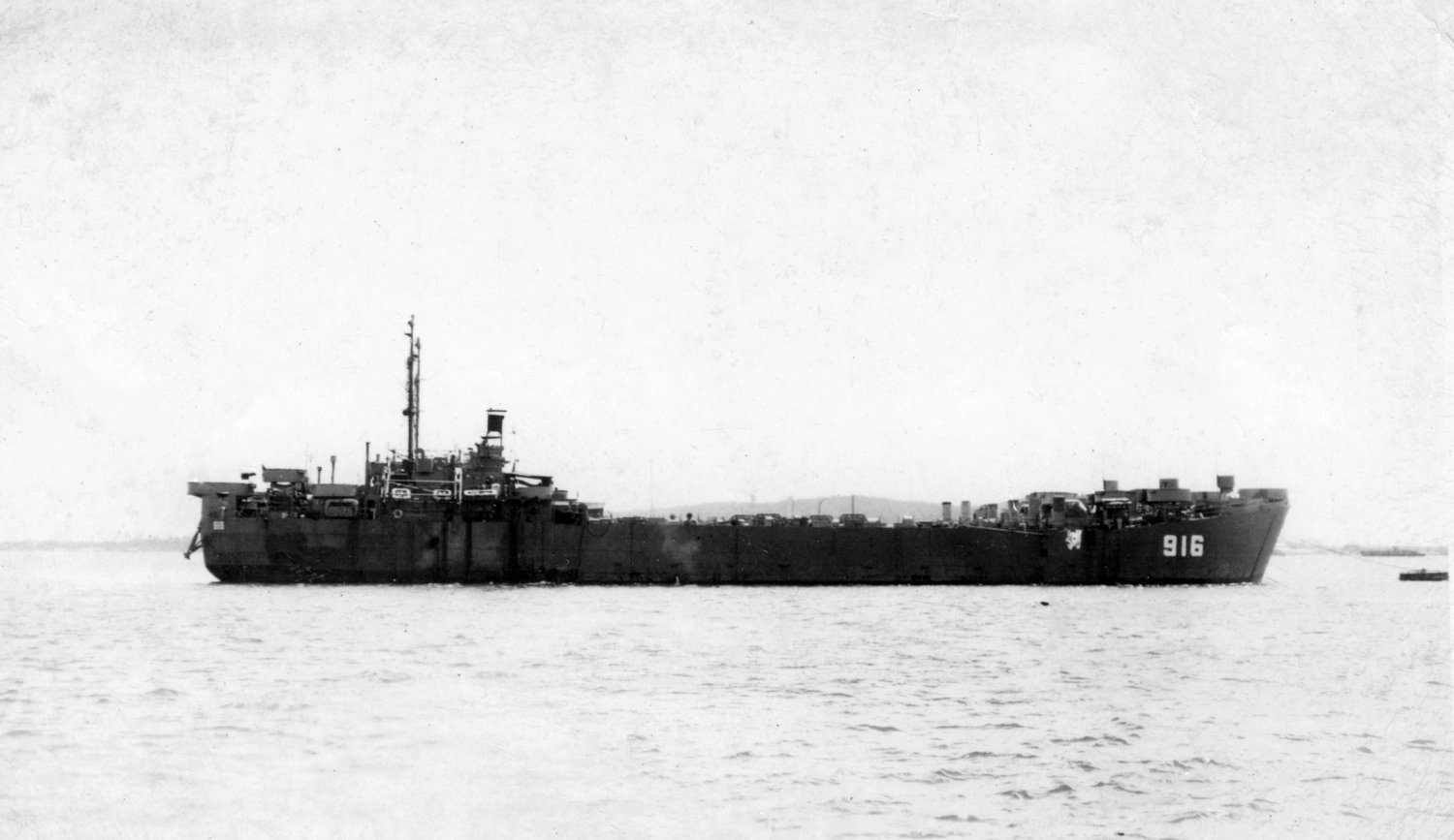
- USS LST-916 moored to a buoy in the Philippines, c. early-1946, waiting for final disposition.

History

United States
- Name: LST-916
- Builder: Bethlehem-Hingham Shipyard, Hingham, Massachusetts
- Yard number: 3386
- Laid down: 22 March 1944
- Launched: 29 April 1944
- Commissioned: 25 May 1944
- Decommissioned: 5 April 1946
- Stricken: 29 September 1947
- Identification: Hull symbol: LST-916; Code letters: NVPG
- Honors and awards: 3 × battle star
- Fate: transferred to the US Army, 28 June 1946, lost 4 October 1948

General characteristics
- Class & type: LST-542-class tank landing ship
- Displacement: 1,625 long tons (1,651 t) (light); 4,080 long tons (4,145 t) (full (seagoing draft with 1,675 short tons (1,520 t) load); 2,366 long tons (2,404 t) (beaching)
- Length: 328 ft (100 m) oa
- Beam: 50 ft (15 m)
- Draft: Unloaded: 2 ft 4 in (0.71 m) forward; 7 ft 6 in (2.29 m) aft; Full load: 8 ft 3 in (2.51 m) forward; 14 ft 1 in (4.29 m) aft; Landing with 500 short tons (450 t) load: 3 ft 11 in (1.19 m) forward; 9 ft 10 in (3.00 m) aft; Limiting 11 ft 2 in (3.40 m); Maximum navigation 14 ft 1 in (4.29 m)
- Installed power: 2 × 900 hp (670 kW) Electro-Motive Diesel 12-567A diesel engines; 1,800 shp (1,300 kW)
- Propulsion: 1 × Falk main reduction gears; 2 × Propellers
- Speed: 11.6 kn (21.5 km/h; 13.3 mph)
- Range: 24,000 nmi (44,000 km; 28,000 mi) at 9 kn (17 km/h; 10 mph) while displacing 3,960 long tons (4,024 t)
- Boats & landing craft carried: 2 x LCVPs
- Capacity: 1,600–1,900 short tons (3,200,000–3,800,000 lb; 1,500,000–1,700,000 kg) cargo depending on mission
- Troops: 16 officers, 147 enlisted men
- Complement: 13 officers, 104 enlisted men
- Armament: Varied, ultimate armament; 2 × twin 40 mm (1.57 in) Bofors guns; 4 × single 40 mm Bofors guns; 12 × 20 mm (0.79 in) Oerlikon cannons

Service record
- Part of: LST Flotilla 14
- Operations: Leyte landings (20 October 1944); Lingayen Gulf landings (4–18 January 1945); Assault and occupation of Okinawa Gunto (2–16 April 1945)
- Awards: Combat Action Ribbon; American Campaign Medal; Asiatic–Pacific Campaign Medal; World War II Victory Medal; Navy Occupation Service Medal w/Asia Clasp; Philippine Republic Presidential Unit Citation; Philippine Liberation Medal

USS LST-916 was an LST-542-class tank landing ship in the United States Navy. Like many of her class, she was not named and is properly referred to by her hull designation.

== Construction ==
LST-916 was laid down on 22 March 1944, at Hingham, Massachusetts, by the Bethlehem-Hingham Shipyard; launched on 29 April 1944; and commissioned on 25 May 1944.

== Service history ==
During World War II, LST-916 was assigned to the Asiatic-Pacific theater and participated in the Leyte landings in October 1944, the Lingayen Gulf landings in January 1845, and the assault and occupation of Okinawa Gunto in April 1945.

Following the war, LST-916 performed occupation duty in the Far East until mid-November 1945. She was decommissioned on 5 April 1946, and transferred to the US Army on 28 June, that same year. On 29 September 1947, she was struck from the Navy list; and, on 4 October 1948, LST-916 was lost in typhoon Libby near Naha Reef, near Naha, Okinawa.

== Awards ==
LST-916 earned three battle star for World War II service.

== Bibliography ==
Online resources

- "LST-916". Dictionary of American Naval Fighting Ships. Naval History and Heritage Command. This article incorporates text from this source, which is in the public domain.
- "Bethlehem-Hingham, Hingham MA". www.ShipbuildingHistory.com. 11 August 2011.
- "USS LST-916". NavSource. 26 September 2015.

Printed resources

- "West Coast ports in the Pacific and Far East mand Fleet and \vcrs caught SOSs Sent By LSTs Off Okinawa Coast". Pacific Stars and Stripes. 4 October 1948. p. 1.
