= USS Bowditch (AG-30) =

U.S. Navy survey ship

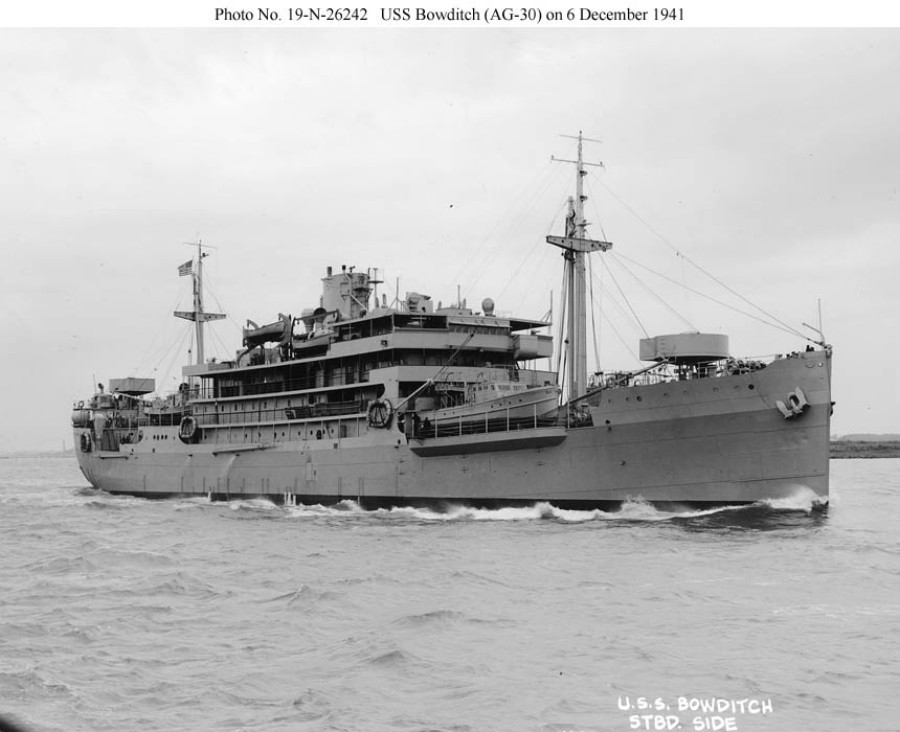
- USS Bowditch underway after a refit, 6 December 1941

History

United States
- Name: MS Santa Inez
- Owner: Grace Line
- Operator: Grace Line
- Builder: Burmeister & Wain, Copenhagen, Denmark
- Launched: 1929
- Commissioned: 12 March 1940
- Fate: Sold to United States Navy 4 March 1940

United States
- Name: USS Bowditch (AG-30)
- Namesake: Nathaniel Bowditch (1773–1838), American mathematician remembered for his work on maritime navigation
- Operator: United States Navy
- Acquired: 4 March 1940
- Commissioned: 12 March 1940
- Decommissioned: unknown date
- Recommissioned: 1 July 1940
- Reclassified: Surveying ship (AGS-4) 1 December 1943
- Decommissioned: 31 January 1947
- Honors and awards: Asiatic–Pacific Campaign Medal with three battle stars
- Fate: Transferred to United States Maritime Commission 9 June 1948

General characteristics (as Grace Line vessel)
- Type: Passenger ship
- Tonnage: 5,000 gross tons
- Length: 386 ft (117.7 m) overall
- Beam: 53 ft (16.2 m)
- Draft: 21 ft 6 in (6.55 m)
- Propulsion: 2 x 6-cylinder, 4-cycle, 3,600 hp (2,685 kW) diesel engines
- Speed: 13 knots (24 km/h; 15 mph)
- Capacity: 125 passengers

General characteristics (as U.S. Navy vessel)
- Type: Survey ship
- Displacement: 5,405 tons
- Length: 386 ft (117.7 m) overall
- Beam: 53 ft (16.2 m)
- Draft: 21 ft 6 in (6.55 m)
- Propulsion: 2 x 6-cylinder, 4-cycle, 3,600 hp (2,685 kW) diesel engines
- Speed: 12 knots (22 km/h; 14 mph)
- Complement: 406
- Armament: 4 x 3 in (76.2 mm)/50 guns

USS Bowditch (AG-30) was a United States Navy survey ship in commission from 1940 to 1947. She saw service during World War II.

Prior to her U.S. Navy service, the ship operated as the American motor passenger ship MS Santa Inez.

== Construction, characterisics, and commercial service ==
Constructed as a commercial passenger ship by Burmeister & Wain in Copenhagen, Denmark, for the Grace Line, MS Santa Inez was launched in 1929. She had diesel power, a short funnel, a cruiser stern, and accommodation for 125 passengers in two classes. She operated on the Grace Line's secondary service from New York City to as far as Valparaíso, Chile. The Great Depression forced the Grace Line to suspend its secondary service in 1932, and Santa Inez was laid up that year, but she returned to active operations when the Grace Line resumed its secondary service in 1933.

== U.S. Navy service ==
The United States Navy purchased Santa Inez on 4 March 1940 and temporarily commissioned her as the miscellaneous auxiliary USS Bowditch (AG-30) on 12 March 1940. She was decommissioned for fitting out as a survey vessel at the Norfolk Navy Yard in Portsmouth, Virginia. With the work complete, she was recommissioned on 1 July 1940 with Commander E. E. Duval in command. Following her recommissioning, Bowditch made numerous geodetic surveys in places such as Little Placentia Bay in Newfoundland, Bermuda, the Bahamas, Jamaica, Cuba, and Haiti.

The United States entered World War II on 7 December 1941. Departing Norfolk, Virginia, on 9 January 1942, Bowditch steamed south to conduct hydrographic surveys of the waters between Panama and Colombia, off the Galápagos Islands, and off the Cocos Islands in Costa Rica. Returning to Norfolk for repairs on 21 November 1942, she departed again on 17 February 1943 and headed southward. After survey work in the Caribbean through May 1943, she transited the Panama Canal to work in the Pacific Ocean along the coasts of Panama, Colombia, and Ecuador. Bowditch was reclassified as a survey ship, AGS-4, on 1 December 1943.

Assigned to Service Force, United States Pacific Fleet, Bowditch arrived at Pearl Harbor, Territory of Hawaii, on 6 January 1944. She served as a survey ship during the invasion of Kwajalein and Majuro Atolls (4 February–2 April 1944); the occupation of Saipan (22 July–4 October); and the capture of Okinawa (18 April–2 September 1945). While off Okinawa she helped rescue survivors of the light minelayer USS Montgomery and the minesweeper USS Force.

World War II ended with the cessation of hostilities between the Allies and Japan on 15 August 1945. Bowditch remained off Okinawa until 3 November 1945, when she departed for the United States. She arrived at San Francisco, California, on 29 November 1945. On 17 February 1946 she sailed for Bikini Atoll to begin preliminary surveys for Operation Crossroads. She continued surveying at Bikini after the July 1946 atomic bomb tests there, returning to San Francisco on 19 October 1946.

Bowditch left San Francisco for Norfolk, Virginia, on 23 November 1946 and was decommissioned at Norfolk on 31 January 1947. She was transferred to the United States Maritime Commission on 9 June 1948 for disposal.

== Honors and awards ==
- Asiatic-Pacific Campaign Medal with three battle stars for World War II service
