= William Ward Burrows I =

United States Marine Corps officer

William W. Burrows
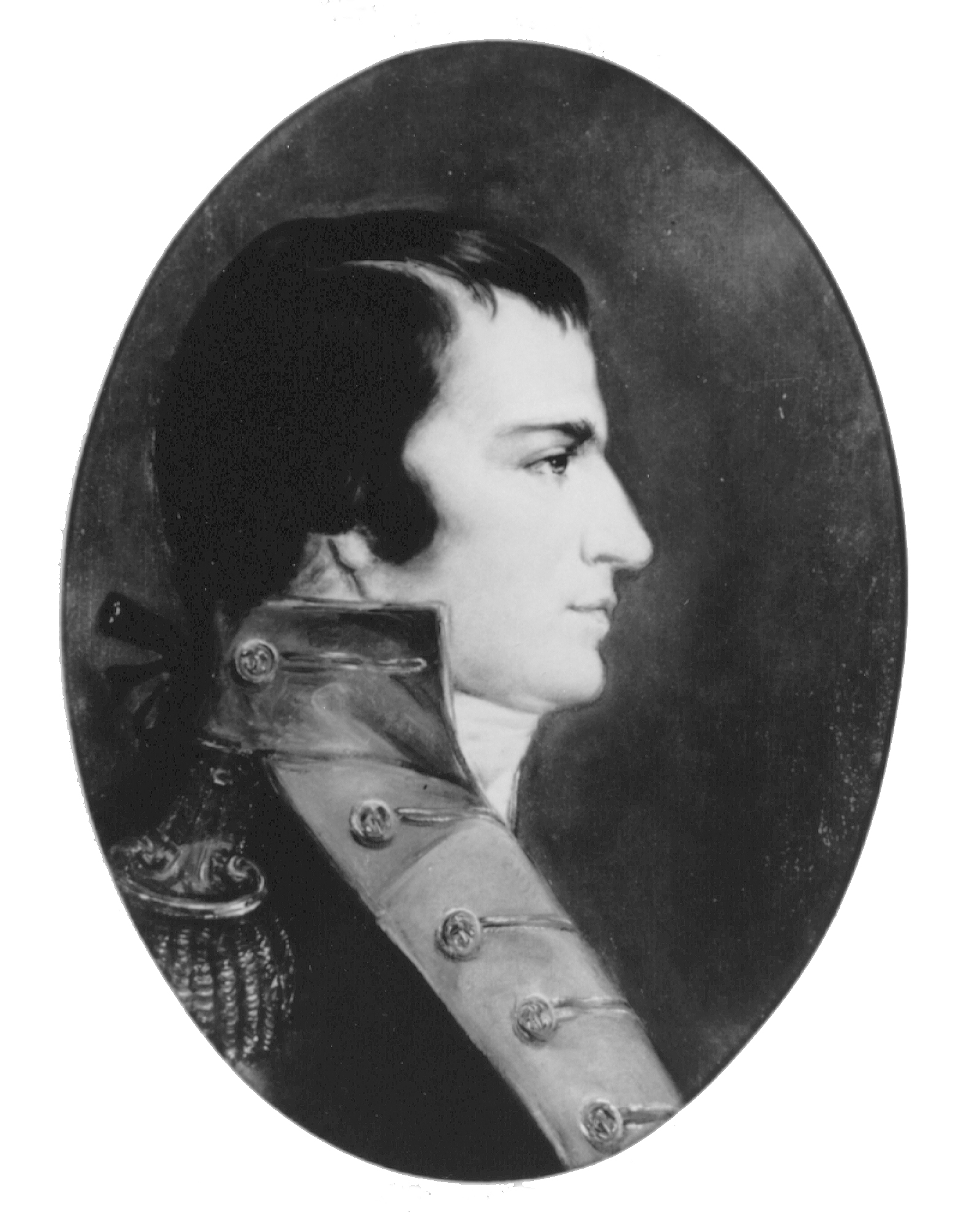
- Portrait of Burrows
- Born: January 16, 1758; Charleston, South Carolina
- Died: March 6, 1805 (aged 47); Washington, D.C., U.S.
- Burial place: Arlington National Cemetery
- Military career
- Allegiance: United States of America
- Branch: South Carolina militia United States Marine Corps
- Service years: 1775-1783; 1798–1804
- Rank: Lieutenant colonel
- Commands: Commandant of the Marine Corps
- Conflicts: American Revolutionary War; Quasi War

William Ward Burrows I (January 16, 1758 – March 6, 1805) was a United States Marine Corps officer the second Commandant of the Marine Corps. His son, William Ward Burrows II, was a decorated officer in the United States Navy.

== Biography ==
Burrows was born in Charleston, South Carolina. He served in the American Revolutionary War with the state troops of South Carolina, but after the war moved to Philadelphia, Pennsylvania to practice law. On July 12, 1798, the day following the approval of an act of Congress establishing a permanent United States Marine Corps, President John Adams appointed him as Major Commandant of the newly created organization which consisted of 881 officers, noncommissioned officers, privates and musicians. (Samuel Nicholas was in charge of the Continental Marines and by tradition is considered the first Marine Commandant.)

The Marine Corps, as well as the Navy, had had its humble beginning a short time prior to its actual authorization as a Corps and both were formed to meet an impending national crisis involving a possible war with France. Marines had been enlisted by the War Department starting about six months before July 1798 as crews for the frigates authorized by Congress. These first Marine units to be organized were ship detachments for newly acquired vessels of the American Navy, which were being hurriedly placed in commission at Philadelphia and hurried off to sea to fight cruisers and destroy commerce in the Quasi-War with France. During the first several months that he was Commandant, his principal concern was the supplying and keeping up to strength the Marine detachments for the vessels of the Navy.

Headquarters of the Corps was in camp near Philadelphia until the national capital began its move to Washington in 1800. A small detachment of Marines was sent to the new capital in March of that year to protect the newly established navy yard, while Major Burrows, with his staff and headquarters troops, moved to Washington in late July and set up their camp.

Major Burrows was promoted to lieutenant colonel on May 1, 1800. The Quasi-War with France continued until September of that year, when matters were finally adjusted. The insistence of Congress that the cost of the naval establishment be immediately reduced caused considerable embarrassment to Burrows in his effort to establish the Marine Corps on a peacetime basis. The Barbary Wars broke out soon afterwards and the main concern of the Corps was to supply detachments to naval vessels for duty in the Mediterranean.

Lieutenant Colonel Burrows is credited with beginning many of the Corps' institutions, including, most notably, the U.S. Marine Band, which he financed in part by levying contributions from his officers. He demanded high standards of professional performance and personal conduct of his officers and these have become hallmarks of the Corps. He also enforced a policy against enlisting "Blacks and Mulattoes" into the United States Marine Corps. Ill health forced his resignation on March 6, 1804.

Lieutenant Colonel Burrows died a year later in Washington, D.C. He was buried in the Presbyterian Cemetery, Georgetown, in the District of Columbia. His remains were re-interred in Arlington National Cemetery on May 12, 1892.

Military offices
Preceded by Maj. Samuel Nicholas (to 1783)	Commandant of the United States Marine Corps; 1798–1804	Succeeded by Lt. Col. Franklin Wharton
