= United States Marine Corps Birthday =

Public holiday in the United States on November 10

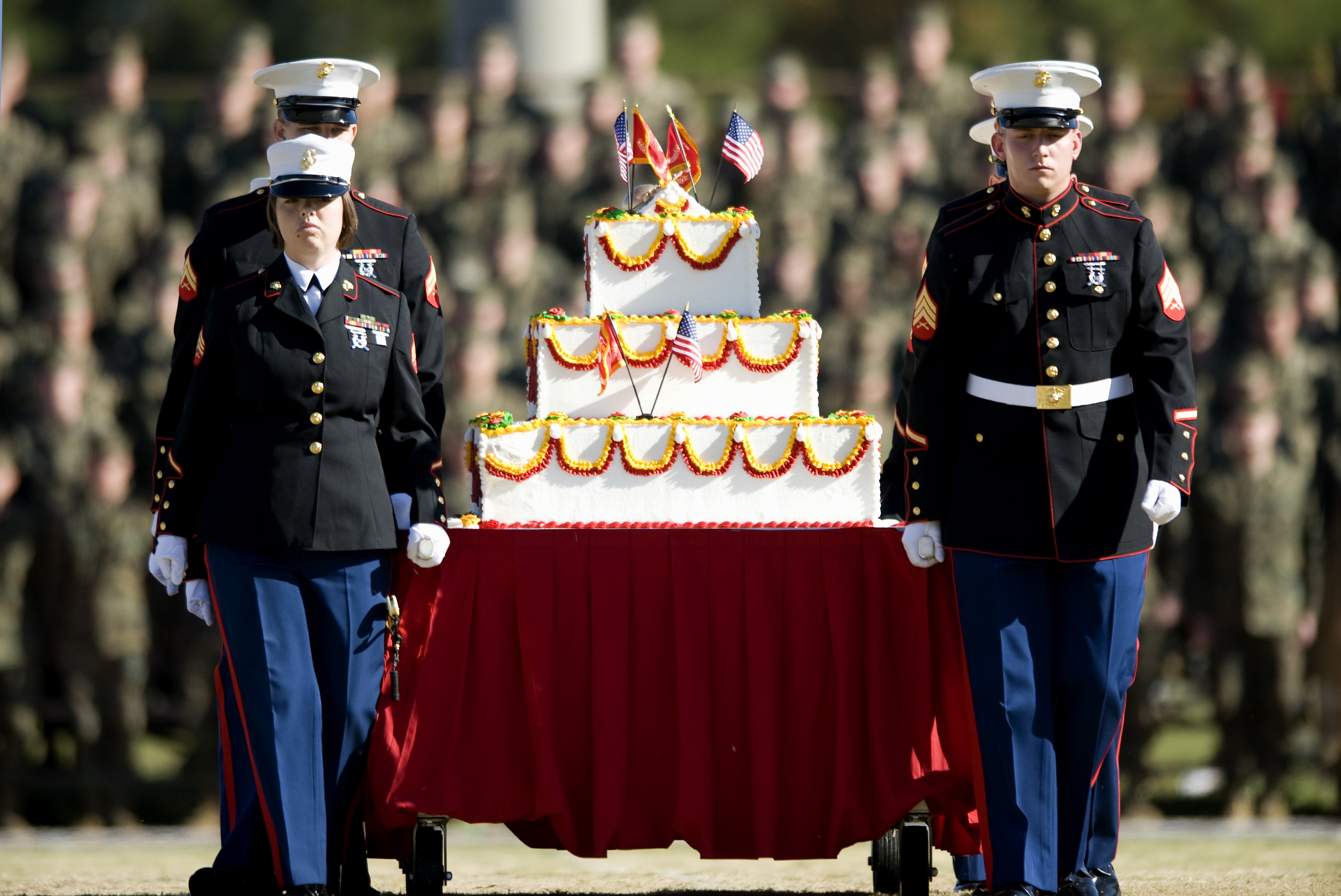
2008 Birthday celebration at Camp Lejeune

The United States Marine Corps birthday is an American holiday celebrated every year on November 10 with a traditional ball and cake-cutting ceremony. On that day in 1775, the Continental Marines were established.

== Historical birthday ==
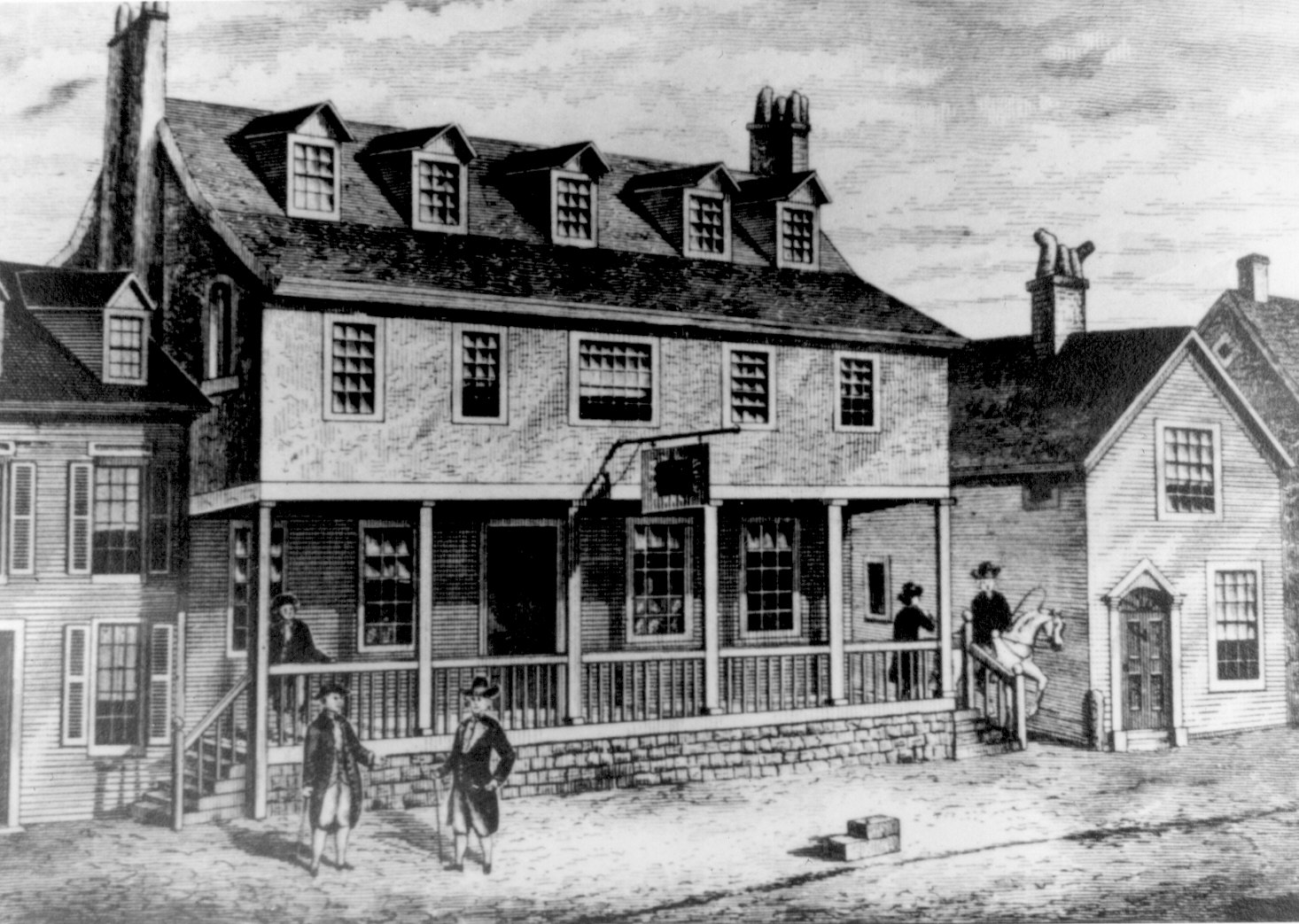
Tun Tavern, "birthplace" of the Marine Corps

The official birthday of the United States Marine Corps is on November 10, 1775. That was the day when the Second Continental Congress established the Continental Marines with the following decree:

That two battalions of Marines be raised consisting of one Colonel, two lieutenant-colonels, two majors and other officers, as usual in other regiments; that they consist of an equal number of privates as with other battalions, that particular care be taken that no persons be appointed to offices, or enlisted into said battalions, but such as are good seamen, or so acquainted with maritime affairs as to be able to serve for and during the present war with Great Britain and the Colonies; unless dismissed by Congress; that they be distinguished by the names of the First and Second Battalions of Marines.

Tun Tavern, in Philadelphia, Pennsylvania, is regarded as the birthplace of the Corps as the location of the first Marines to enlist under Commandant Samuel Nicholas, though it is disputed if a recruiting drive may have occurred earlier at Nicholas's family tavern, the Conestoga Waggon [sic]. When the Revolutionary War ended in 1783, the Continental Navy was disestablished, and with it, the Continental Marines. The Corps was re-established on 11 July 1798, when the act for establishing and organizing a Marine Corps was signed by President John Adams.

== Celebration ==
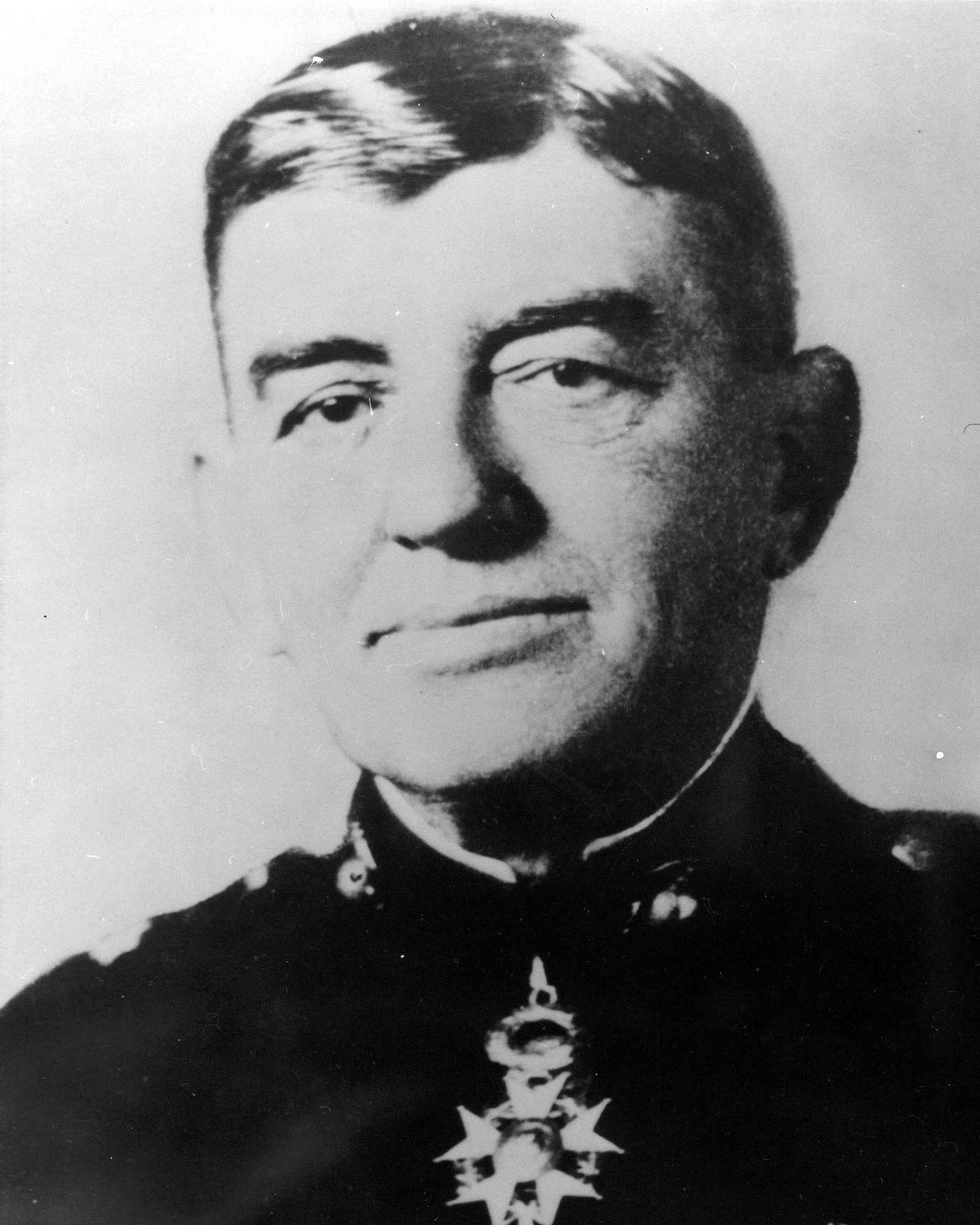
John A. Lejeune, author of Marine Corps Order 47

Prior to 1921, Marines celebrated the recreation of the Corps on 11 July with little pomp or pageantry. On October 21, 1921, Major Edwin North McClellan, in charge of the Corps' fledgling historical section, sent a memorandum to Commandant John A. Lejeune, suggesting the Marines' original birthday of November 10 be declared a Marine Corps holiday to be celebrated throughout the Corps. Lejeune so ordered in Marine Corps Order 47:

MARINE CORPS ORDERS
No. 47 (Series 1921)
HEADQUARTERS U.S. MARINE CORPS
Washington, November 1, 1921

759. The following will be read to the command on the 10th of November, 1921, and hereafter on the 10th of November of every year. Should the order not be received by the 10th of November, 1921, it will be read upon receipt.

1. On November 10, 1775, a Corps of Marines was created by a resolution of Continental Congress. Since that date many thousand men have borne the name "Marine". In memory of them it is fitting that we who are Marines should commemorate the birthday of our corps by calling to mind the glories of its long and illustrious history.
2. The record of our corps is one which will bear comparison with that of the most famous military organizations in the world's history. During 90 of the 146 years of its existence the Marine Corps has been in action against the Nation's foes. From the Battle of Trenton to the Argonne, Marines have won foremost honors in war, and in the long eras of tranquility at home, generation after generation of Marines have grown gray in war in both hemispheres and in every corner of the seven seas, that our country and its citizens might enjoy peace and security.
3. In every battle and skirmish since the birth of our corps, Marines have acquitted themselves with the greatest distinction, winning new honors on each occasion until the term "Marine" has come to signify all that is highest in military efficiency and soldierly virtue.
4. This high name of distinction and soldierly repute we who are Marines today have received from those who preceded us in the corps. With it we have also received from them the eternal spirit which has animated our corps from generation to generation and has been the distinguishing mark of the Marines in every age. So long as that spirit continues to flourish Marines will be found equal to every emergency in the future as they have been in the past, and the men of our Nation will regard us as worthy successors to the long line of illustrious men who have served as "Soldiers of the Sea" since the founding of the Corps.

JOHN A. LEJEUNE,
Major General Commandant

75705—21

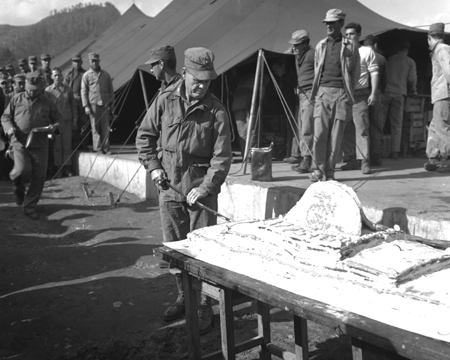
Col Lewis B. "Chesty" Puller cuts the Marine Corps birthday cake in 1950, during a brief reprieve in battle during the Korean War.

The first formal ball was celebrated in 1925, though no records exist that indicate the proceedings of that event. Birthday celebrations would take varied forms, most included dances, though some accounts include mock battles, musical performances, pageants, and sporting events.

The celebrations were formalized and standardized by Commandant Lemuel C. Shepherd, Jr. in 1952, outlining the cake cutting ceremony, which would enter the Marine Drill Manual in 1956. By tradition, the first slice of cake is given to the guest of honor. The second piece to the oldest Marine present, who in turn hands it off to the youngest Marine present, symbolizing the old and experienced Marines passing their knowledge to the new generation of Marines. The celebration also includes a reading of Marine Corps Order 47, republished every year, as well as a message from the current Commandant, and often includes a banquet and dancing if possible. In many cases, the birthday celebration will also include a pageant of current and historical Marine Corps uniforms, as a reminder of the history of the Corps. Another modern tradition includes a unit run on the 10th. Marines are reputed to celebrate the birthday, regardless of where they may be in the world, even in austere environments or combat.

In a more somber tradition, Samuel Nicholas's grave in the Arch Street Friends Meeting graveyard in Philadelphia is marked with a wreath at dawn by a group of Marines annually on November 10 to celebrate his role in the founding of the Corps.

== Gallery ==
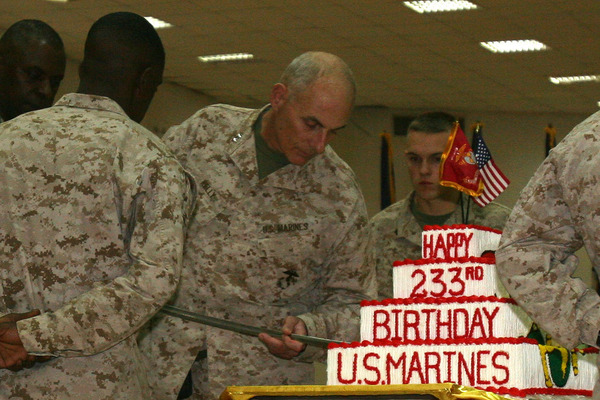
John F. Kelly with Multi-National Forces West in Fallujah, 2008

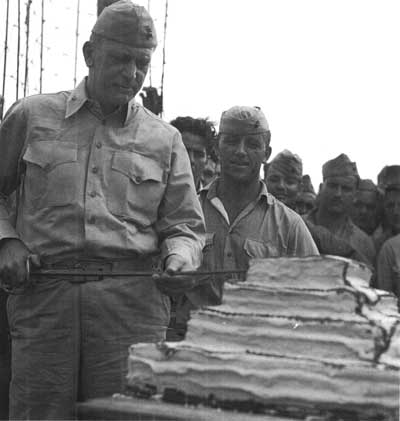
Harry B. Liversedge with the Marine Raiders in 1943

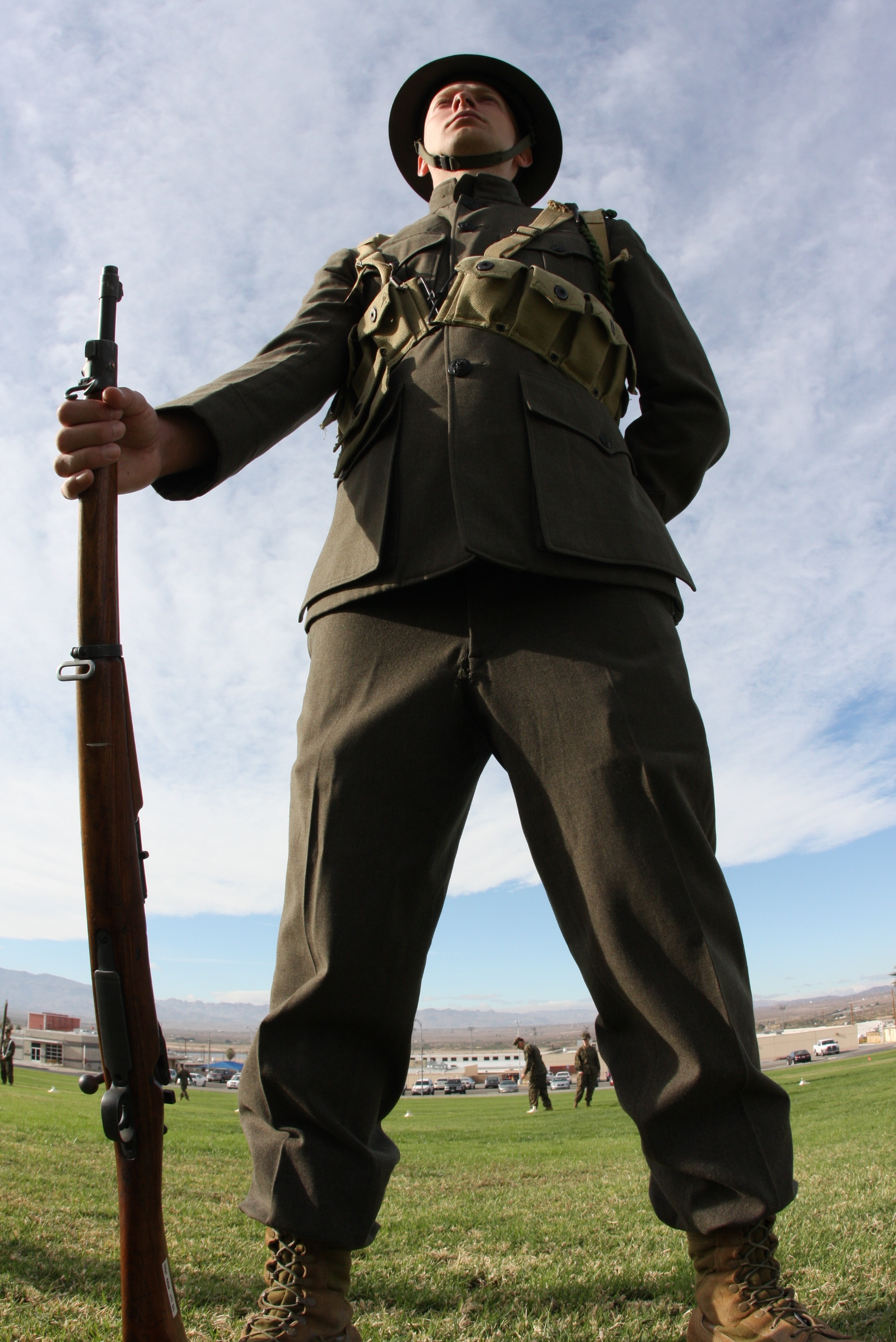
Marine modelling a World War I-era uniform at the 2008 Birthday Pageant at MCAGCC Twentynine Palms

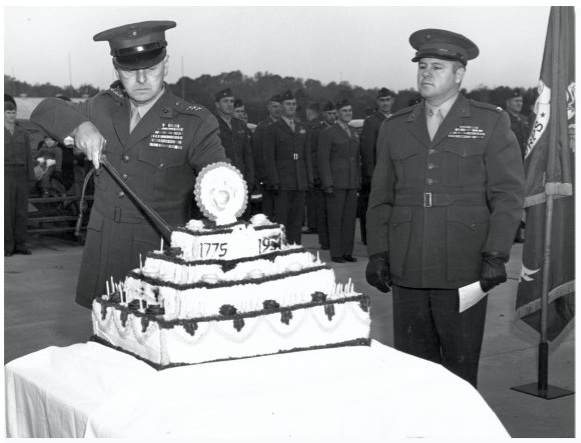
Franklin A. Hart cuts a cake for The Basic School while David M. Shoup looks on in 1951. Note that this cake has candles.

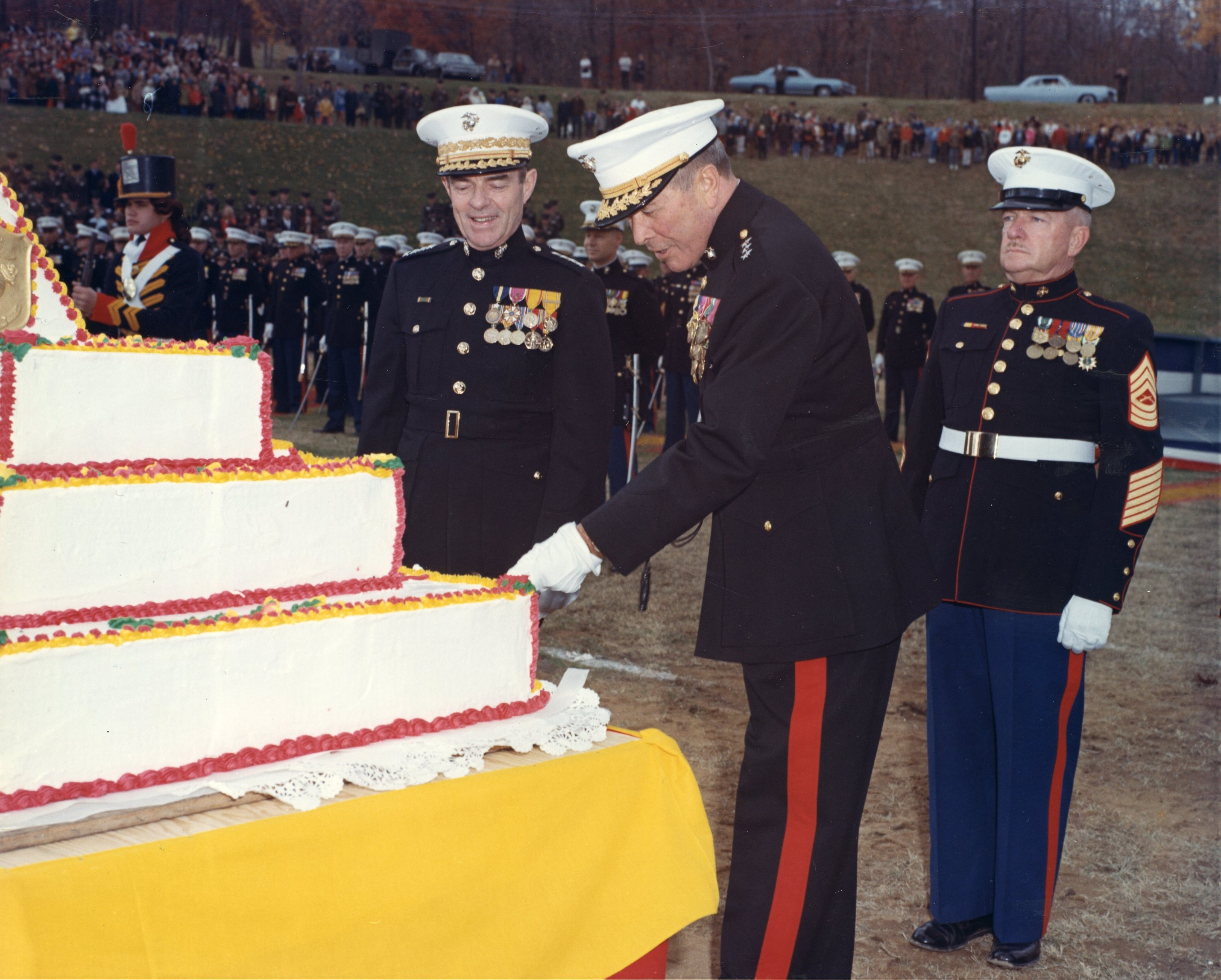
Marine Corps Birthday 1969, Marine Corps Development and Educational Center Quantico, Commanding general Lewis J. Fields cutting the cake and Commandant of the Marine Corps, Wallace M. Greene (on the left) looks on.

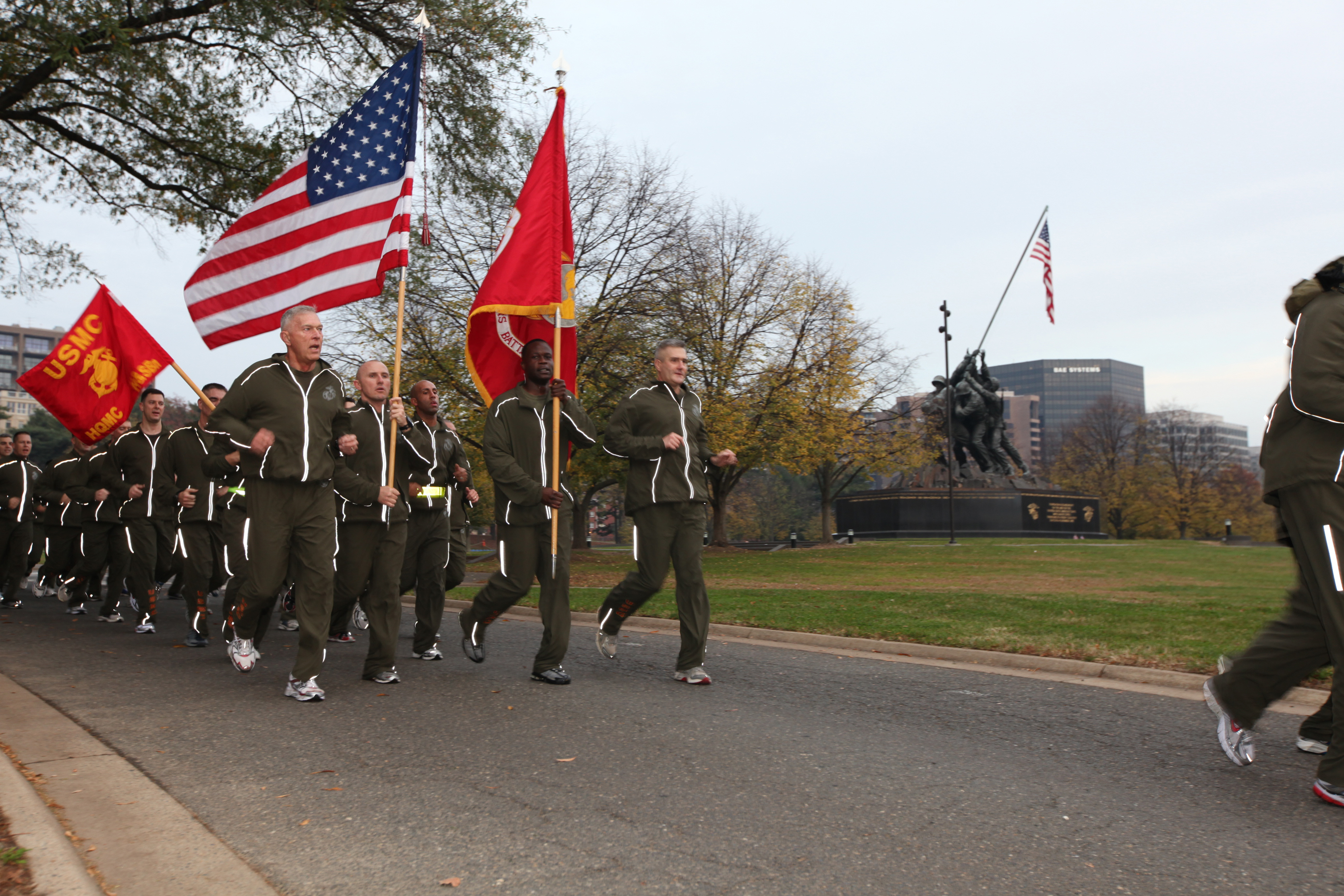
James T. Conway leads a unit run of Marines in 2009.

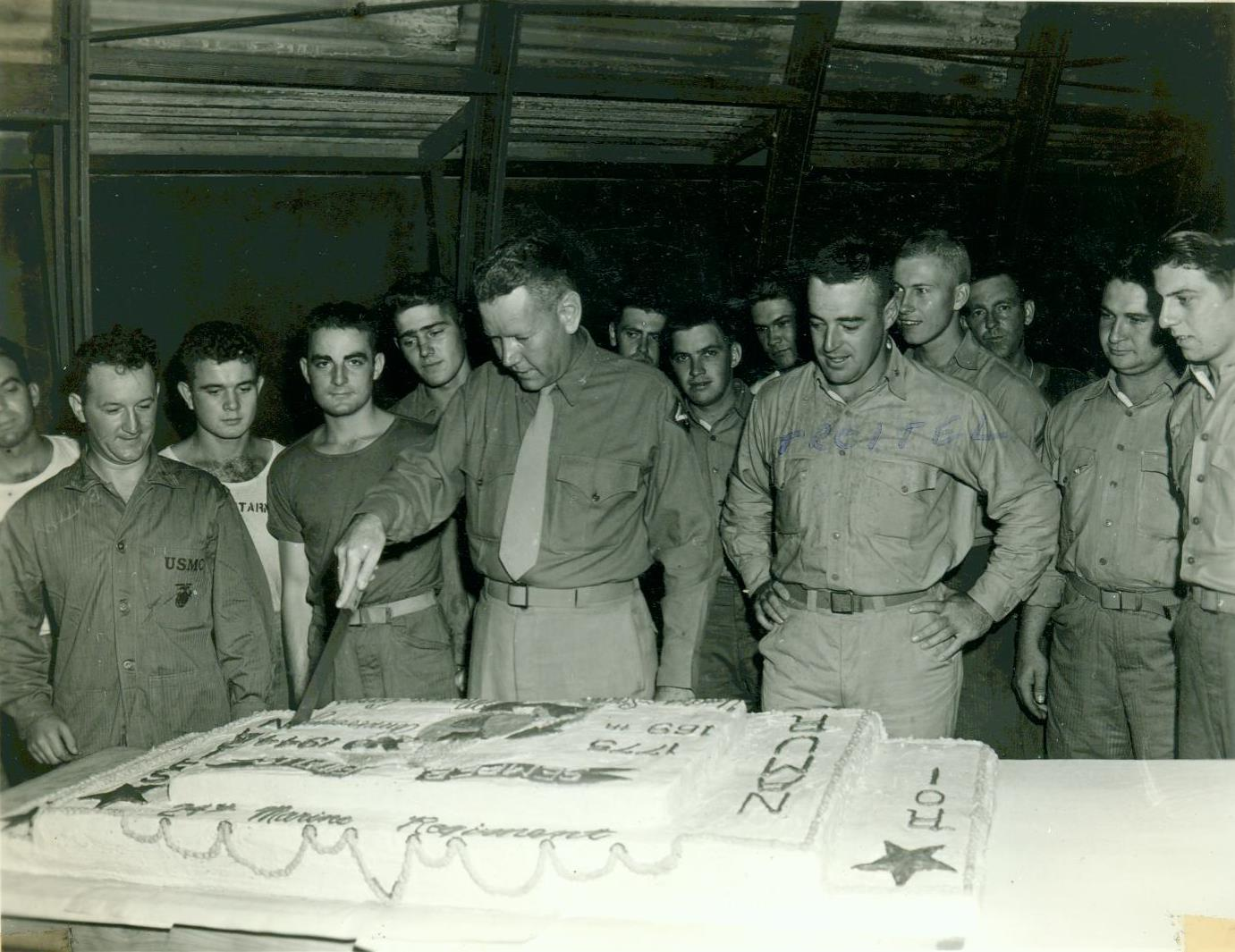
Austin R. Brunelli cutting the cake with the members of the 24th Marine Regiment during the celebration of the Marine Corps Birthday in Maui, 1944.

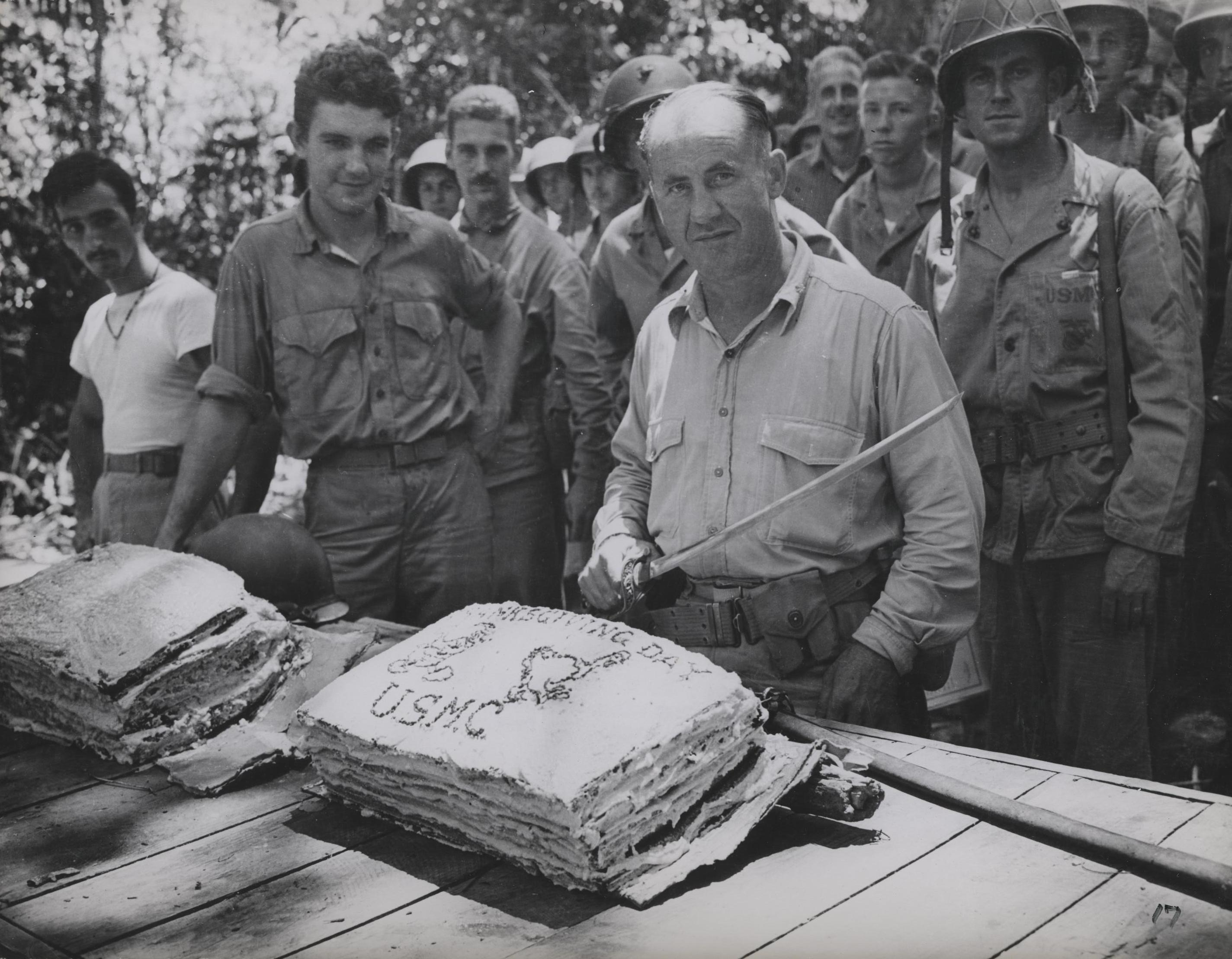
William W. Stickney cuts a Thanksgiving cake with a Japanese officer's sword at Guadalcanal, as hungry Leathernecks look on

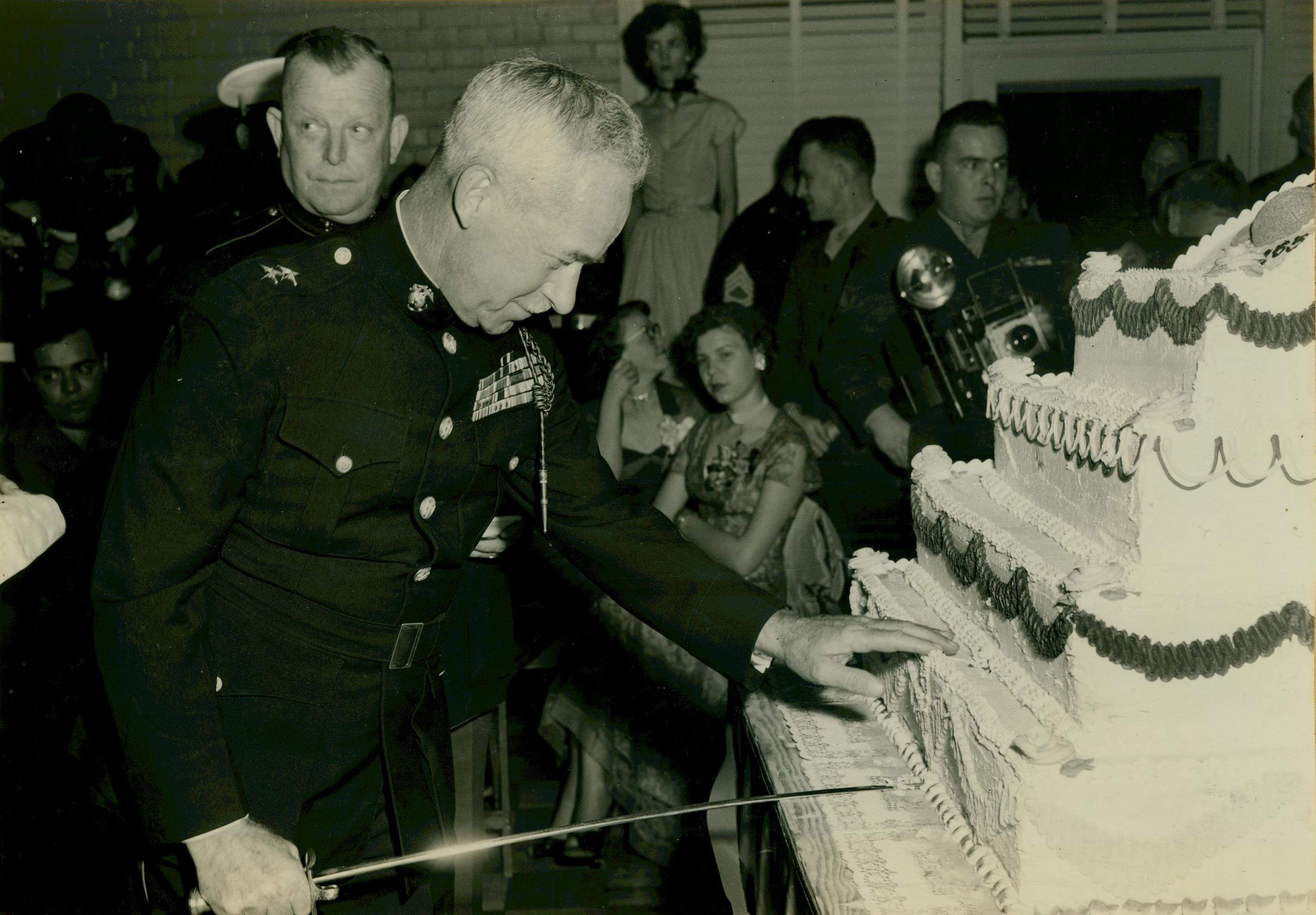
Merwin H. Silverthorn cuts the Marine Corps Birthday Cake in 1953 at MCRD Parris Island.

== See also ==
- Culture of the United States Marine Corps
- History of the United States Marine Corps

== Bibliography ==
- Sturkey, Marion F. (2001). Warrior Culture of the U.S. Marines. Heritage Press International.
