= USS Nicholas (FFG-47) =

1983 Oliver Hazard Perry-class frigate

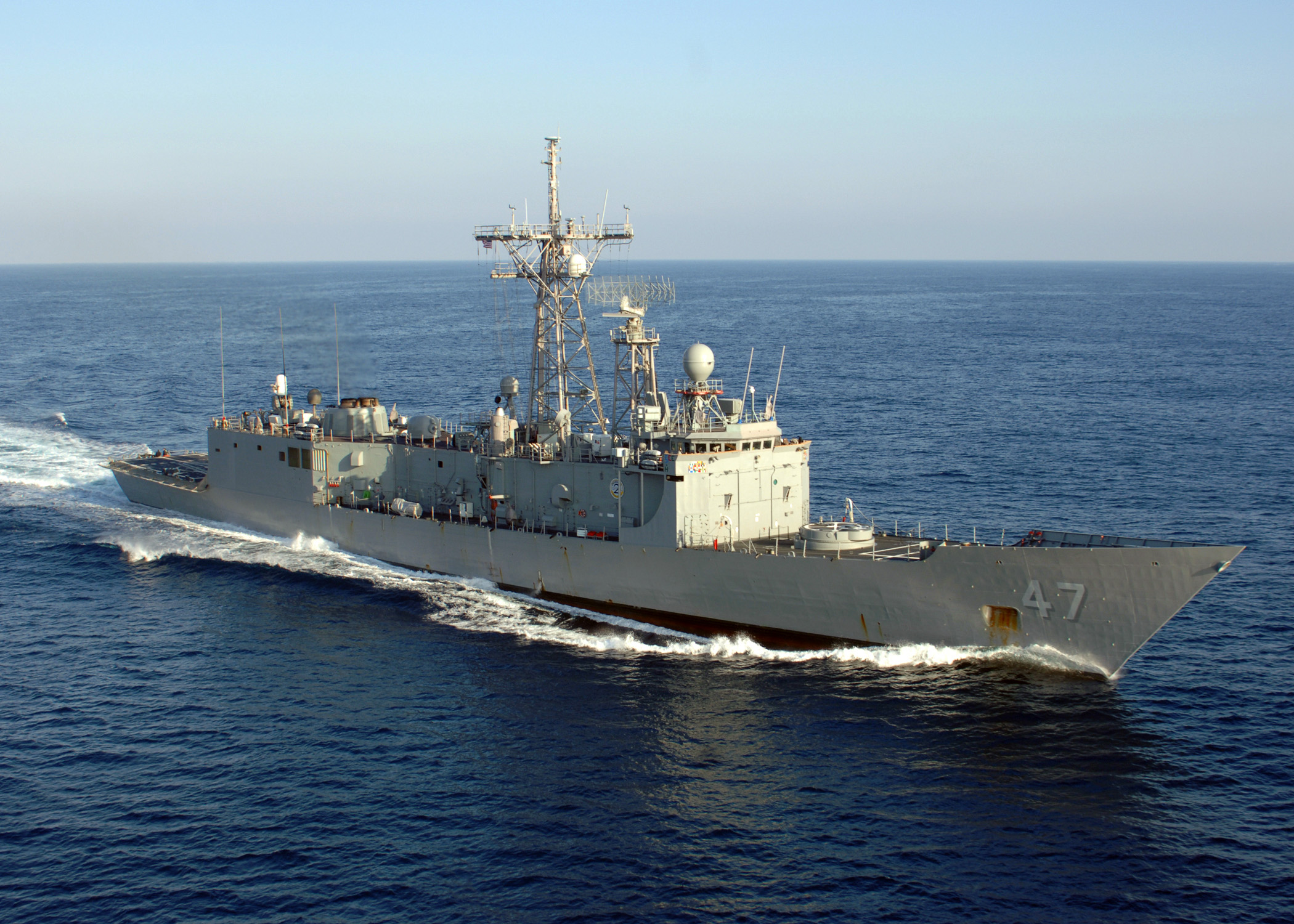
- USS Nicholas (FFG-47)

History

United States
- Name: Nicholas
- Namesake: Major Samuel Nicholas
- Awarded: 28 April 1980
- Builder: Bath Iron Works, Bath, Maine
- Laid down: 27 September 1982
- Launched: 23 April 1983
- Sponsored by: Mrs. Florence E. Tryon (Mitchell)
- Commissioned: 10 March 1984
- Decommissioned: 17 March 2014
- Identification: Hull symbol: FFG-47; Code letters: NSVN
- Motto: "Carrying on a Proud Tradition"
- Fate: Sold for Scrap February 28, 2023
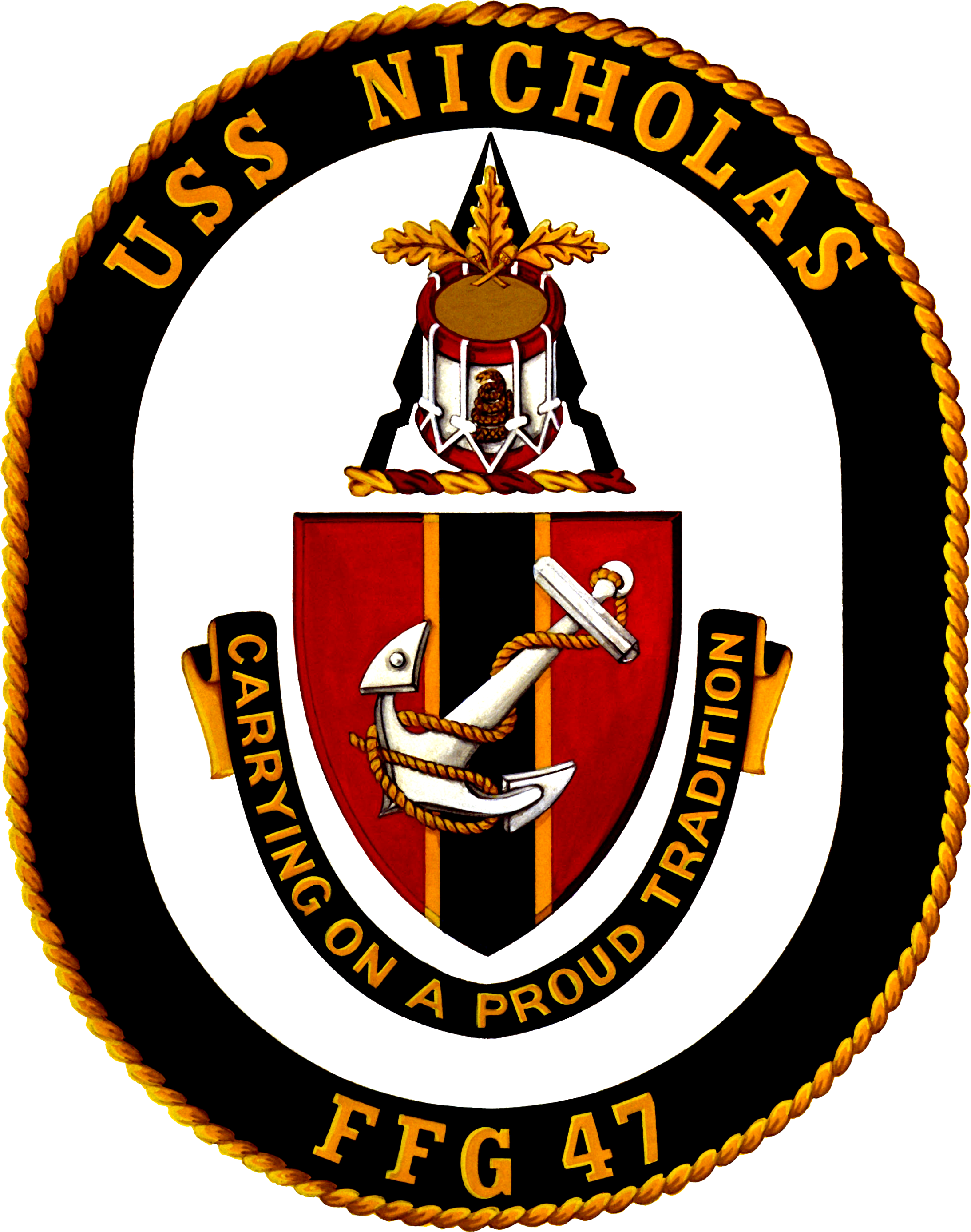
- Badge

General characteristics
- Class & type: Oliver Hazard Perry-class frigate
- Displacement: 4,100 long tons (4,200 t), full load
- Length: 453 feet (138 m), overall
- Beam: 45 feet (14 m)
- Draught: 22 feet (6.7 m)
- Propulsion: 2 × General Electric LM2500-30 gas turbines generating 41,000 shp (31 MW) through a single shaft and variable pitch propeller; 2 × Auxiliary Propulsion Units, 350 hp (260 kW) retractable electric azimuth thrusters for maneuvering and docking.
- Speed: over 29 knots (54 km/h)
- Range: 5,000 nautical miles at 18 knots (9,300 km at 33 km/h)
- Complement: 15 officers and 190 enlisted, plus SH-60 LAMPS detachment of roughly six officer pilots and 15 enlisted maintainers
- Sensors & processing systems: AN/SPS-49 air-search radar; AN/SPS-55 surface-search radar; CAS and STIR fire-control radar; AN/SQS-56 sonar.
- Electronic warfare & decoys: AN/SLQ-32
- Armament: As built: 1 × OTO Melara Mk 75 76 mm/62 caliber naval gun; 2 × Mk 32 triple-tube (324 mm) launchers for Mark 46 torpedoes; 1 × Vulcan Phalanx CIWS; 4 × .50-cal (12.7 mm) machine guns.; 1 × Mk 13 Mod 4 single-arm launcher for Harpoon anti-ship missiles and SM-1MR Standard anti-ship/air missiles (40 round magazine); Note: As of 2004, Mk 13 systems removed from all active US vessels of this class.
- Aircraft carried: 2 × SH-60 LAMPS III helicopters
- Aviation facilities: 2 × hangars; RAST helicopter hauldown system

USS Nicholas (FFG-47), an Oliver Hazard Perry-class frigate, was the third ship of the United States Navy to be named for Major Samuel Nicholas, the first commanding officer of the United States Marines. A third-generation guided missile frigate of the Oliver Hazard Perry class, she was laid down as Bath Iron Works hull number 388 on 27 September 1982 and launched 23 April 1983. Sponsor at her commissioning there on 10 March 1984 was the same Mrs. Edward B. Tryon who sponsored DD 449 in 1942.

Nicholas was designed to provide in-depth protection for military and merchant shipping, amphibious task forces, and underway replenishment groups. Her 453-foot (loa) hull displaces 4,100 tons and her gas turbine power develops 41,000 shp (31,000 kW) for a single screw, giving a top speed of over 29 knots (54 km/h).

USS Nicholas during her acceptance trials in 1984

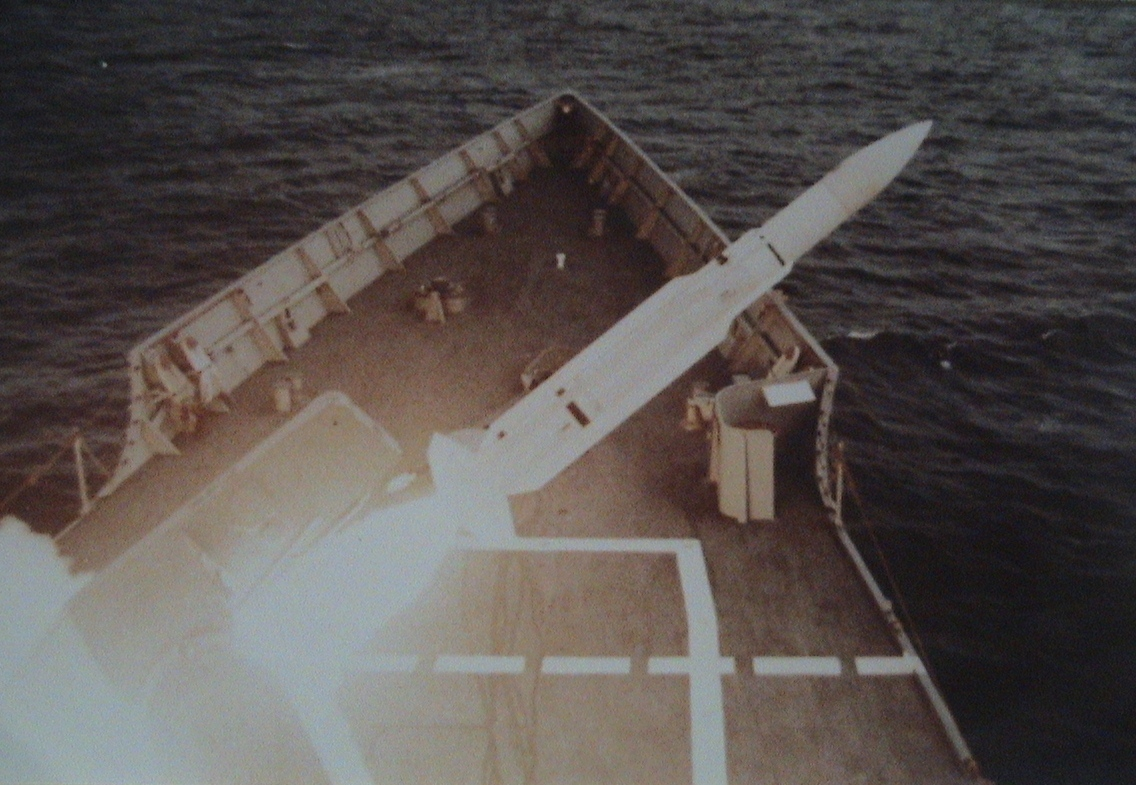
Standard missile shot against a supersonic target off Puerto Rico in 1984

Since her commissioning, Nicholas has deployed to the Persian Gulf, Mediterranean and North Sea, as well as participating in maritime interdiction operations and various fleet exercises. During her first four years as a commissioned vessel, she earned three Battle Efficiency "E" awards, and the Battenberg Cup as the best ship in the Atlantic Fleet. She earned the Top Ship award from Commander Battle Force Sixth Fleet during her first deployment to the Mediterranean.

== 1980s ==
During her first years, Nicholas was part of Destroyer Squadron 6 in Charleston, South Carolina. Her sister ships in DESRON 6 included USS Taylor and O'Bannon, which harkened back to the World War II Fletcher-class destroyers Nicholas, Taylor, and O'Bannon. These ships had such distinguished records in World War II, especially in the Solomon Islands campaign, that Admiral Halsey ordered all three ships be present with USS Missouri at the Japanese surrender in Tokyo Bay.

In July 1987, Nicholas, together with DESRON 6 sister ship Deyo, deployed with the Iowa Battleship Battlegroup to the Mediterranean. She was deployed to the Persian Gulf in 1988 during the Iran–Iraq War, where she participated in Operation Earnest Will, which was a mission to escort reflagged tanker ships. She earned her first Armed Forces Expeditionary Medal.

== 1990s ==
When hostilities with Iraq broke out during the Gulf War on 17 January 1991, Nicholas was serving in the extreme Northern Persian Gulf as an advance Combat Search and Rescue platform, more than 70 miles (110 km) forward of the nearest allied warship. During the first few weeks of the war she attacked Iraqi positions off the coast of Kuwait, capturing the first of 23 Iraqi prisoners of war, sinking or damaging seven Iraqi patrol boats, destroying eight drifting mines and rescuing a downed USAF F-16 pilot from the waters off the Kuwaiti coast. Nicholas also escorted the battleships Missouri and Wisconsin during naval gunfire support operations near Khafji off the coast of Saudi Arabia and Kuwait.

In her 1993 six-month deployment, Nicholas conducted operations in the Red Sea, Mediterranean, Ionian Sea and Adriatic Sea. This deployment was in support of the United Nations sanctions against the governments of Iraq and the Former Republic of Yugoslavia. During these operations, she safely conducted over 170 boardings of merchant vessels to inspect for illegal cargo shipments.

In 1995, Nicholas deployed to the Adriatic and was assigned to the Standing NATO Force Atlantic, again operating in support of United Nations resolutions in Operation Sharp Guard. She intercepted over 120 vessels in enforcing sanctions against the Former Republic of Yugoslavia. In September 1995 Nicholas located and rescued Albanian citizens seeking clandestine entrance across the Adriatic into Italy. Their boat was found capsized after reportedly being run over by a ferry ship and catching on fire in the night. Many sustained injuries, burns and were severely dehydrated. The ship's SAR swimmer with the assistance of the deck crew rescued 16 survivors including a four-year-old girl and her mother. Three bodies of deceased members of the group were also recovered with assistance from helicopter operations. All survivors were given immediate medical attention, water and food and brought safely back to port for full recovery.

== 2000s ==
The 2001 deployment took Nicholas to the Mediterranean and Persian Gulf. While in the Mediterranean, she conducted numerous boardings in support of United Nations sanctions. On 11 September, Nicholas sortied on an emergency basis from Valletta, Malta and conducted sustained underway operations until returning to her home port of Norfolk, Virginia two months later.

In 2003 the vessel became the first warship to enter Neum, Bosnia since 1917, and the first U.S. warship ever. While there, Nicholas hosted the Bosnian Tri-Presidency and numerous government and military officials.

Nicholas operated as the sole US warship in the Mediterranean for her six-month deployment and acted as a surrogate for the Argentina ship Sarandi, enhancing international relations and building new alliances. She participated in multiple exercises and operations and achieved historic distinction when she tracked and assisted in the interception of a merchant ship loaded with nuclear centrifuges bound for Libya. US Government officials directly linked the interception of this vessel to the abandonment of Libya's nuclear weapons program.

Nicholas deployed again in 2005 on a 3-month cruise, making port calls in Spain, Denmark, Turkey, France and Greece. In 2006 she deployed once more to the Persian Gulf, conducting patrols around the Iraqi oil terminals Kaot & Abot, alongside USS McFaul, HMAS Ballarat, and other coalition warships. In 2008 Nicholas deployed once more as part of the Standing NATO Maritime Group-1.

== 2010s ==
On 1 April 2010, Nicholas came under fire from Somali pirates while deployed in the waters off of East Africa near the coast of Kenya and Somalia conducting anti-piracy operations. Nicholas seized five pirates, sank their skiff, and captured a pirate mother ship. The pirates were tried in the U.S. and convicted of piracy, which carries a mandatory life sentence.

== Awards ==
Nicholas has earned the Combat Action Ribbon, Southwest Asia Service Medal (with three bronze stars), Armed Forces Expeditionary Medal, the NATO Medal, Kuwait Liberation Medal (Saudi Arabia), Kuwait Liberation Medal (Kuwait), Armed Forces Service Medal, Sea Service Ribbon (with seven bronze stars), Meritorious Unit Commendation, a Coast Guard Meritorious Unit Commendation (with O for Law Enforcement), and six Battle Efficiency "E" awards as top ship in her squadron.

=== Decommissioning ===
On 10 March 2014 Nicholas was decommissioned at Naval Station Norfolk, Virginia.

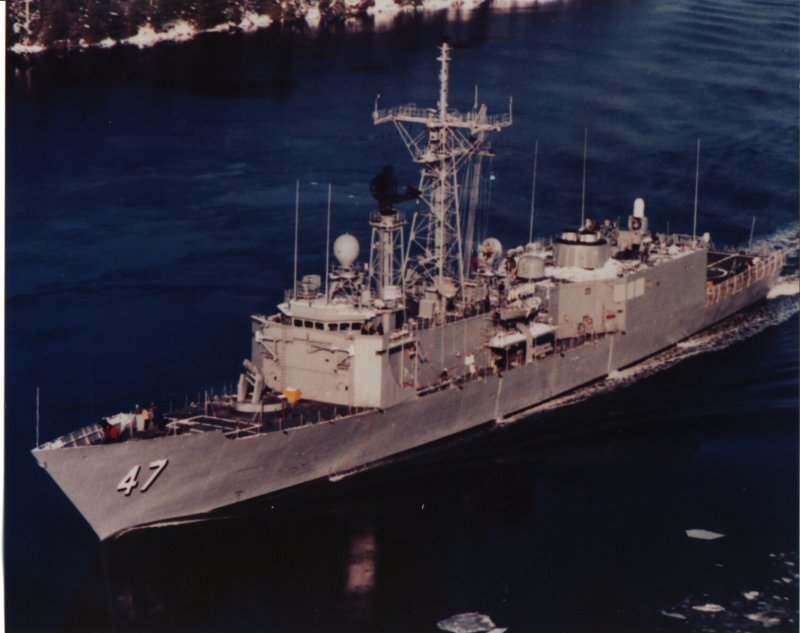
This is Uss nicholis

On 28 February 2023, Nicholas was removed from the Naval Inactive Ship Maintenance Facility in Philadelphia, Pennsylvania and began its journey to Brownsville, Texas, where it will be scrapped. to the scrappers torch
