= Franklin Wharton =

United States Marine Corps general

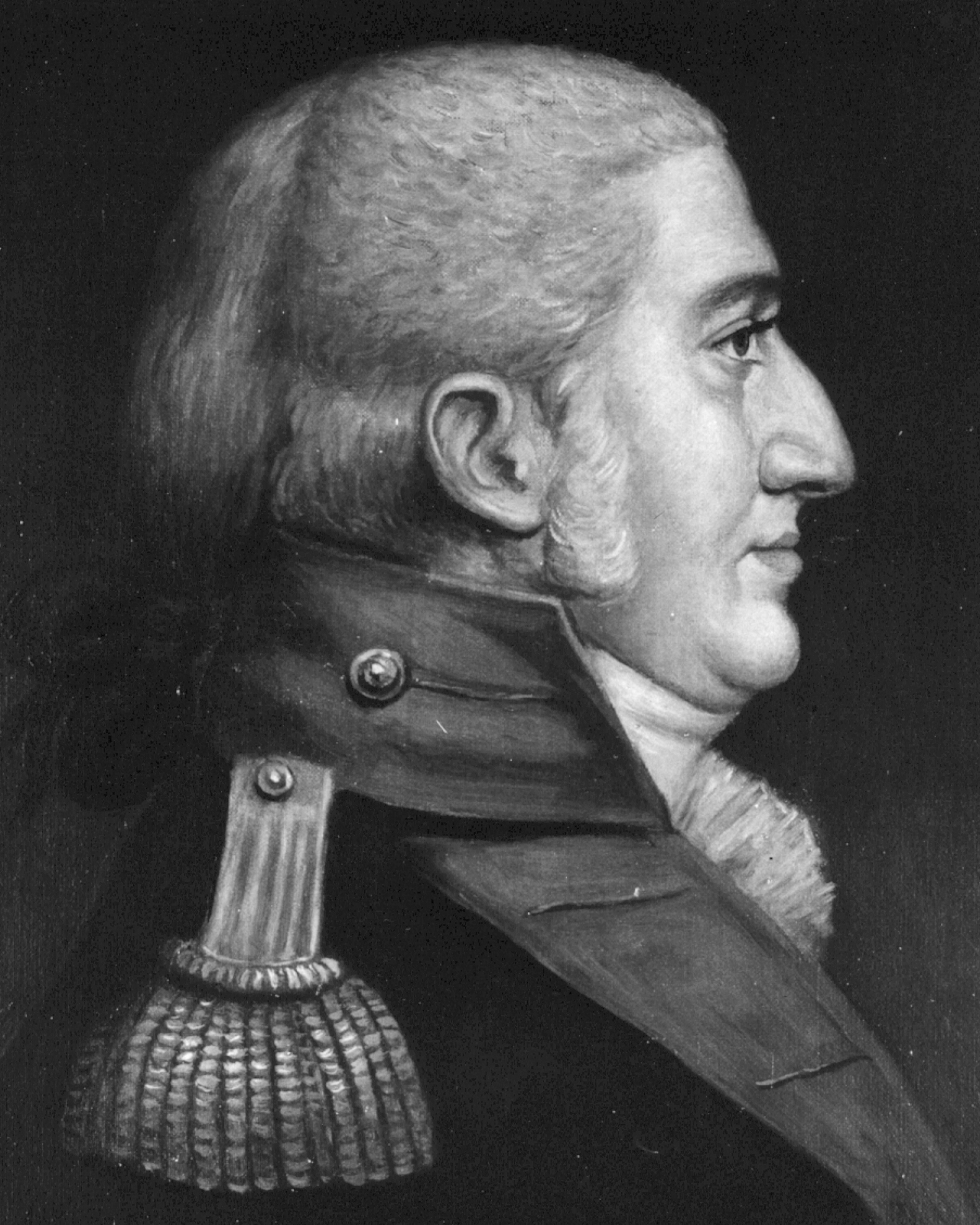
- Born: July 23, 1767; Philadelphia, Pennsylvania, British America
- Died: September 1, 1818 (aged 51); New York City, US
- Burial place: Trinity Churchyard New York City
- Military career
- Allegiance: United States
- Branch: United States Marine Corps
- Service years: 1798–1818
- Rank: Lieutenant Colonel
- Commands: Commandant of the Marine Corps
- Conflicts: War of 1812

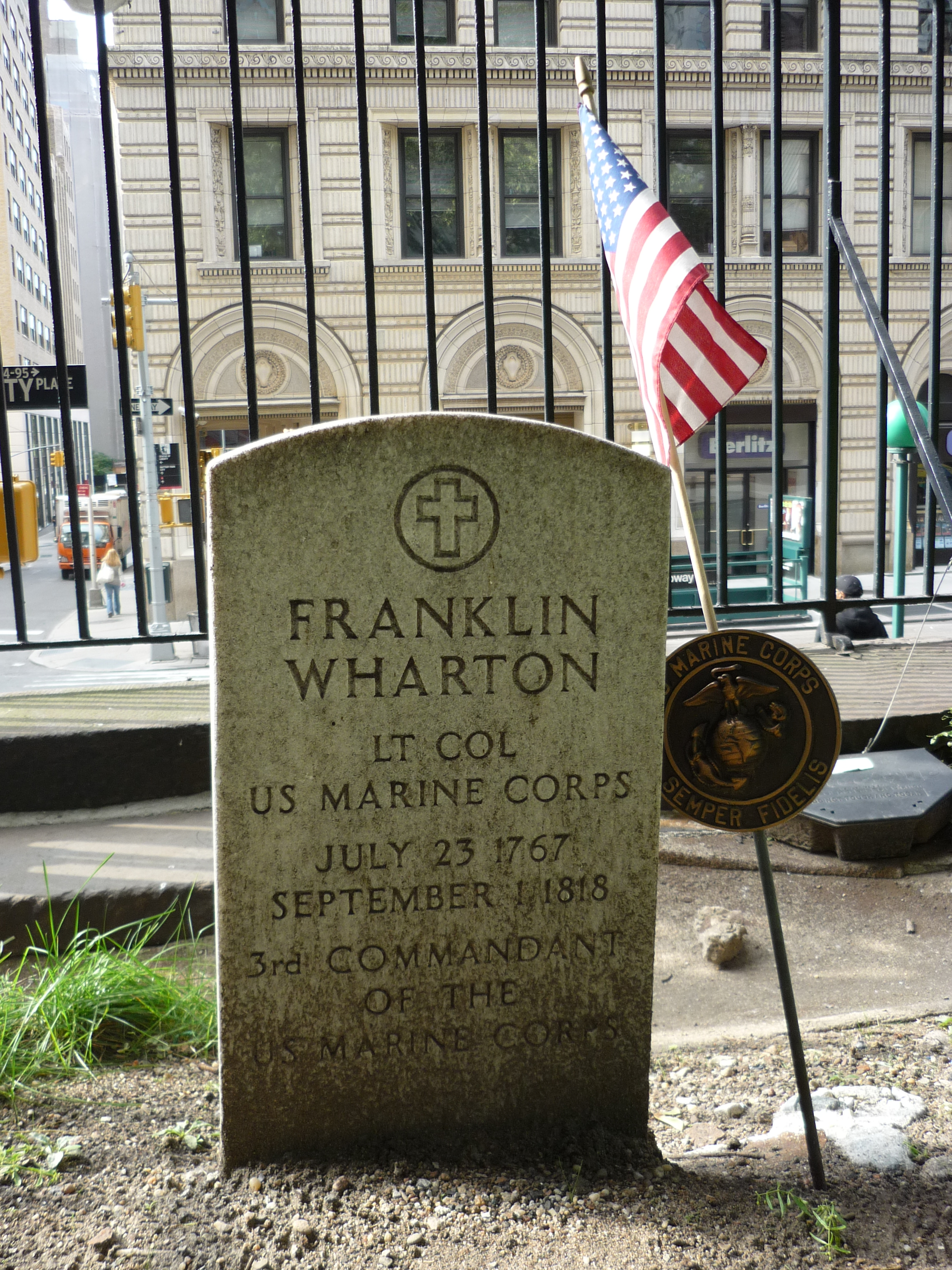
Commandant Wharton's gravestone

Franklin Wharton (July 23, 1767 – September 1, 1818) was the third Commandant of the United States Marine Corps.

== Biography ==
Wharton was born into a prominent Philadelphia, Pennsylvania family, the son of Joseph Wharton. He had forsaken a successful business career to become the Lieutenant of Marines for the frigate United States, which was still part of the War Department. He was quickly promoted to captain in August 1798 and served as officer in charge of the vessel's Marine Detachment until the close of the Quasi-War with France in 1801.

At age 36 and a Marine officer for only five years, he became Lieutenant Colonel and Marine Corps Commandant on March 6, 1804. He was the first Commandant to occupy the Commandant's House, Marine Barracks, Washington, D.C.

As Commandant, Lt. Col. Wharton ordered a detachment of Marines to Georgia and Florida in 1811 to cooperate with United States Army troops in an attempt to subdue an Indian uprising.

Under Wharton's leadership, Marines participated in many important engagements during the War of 1812. They saw action at Annapolis, Fort McHenry, Portsmouth, Craney Island, Bladensburg and New Orleans, and fought under General Henry Dearborn on the northern frontier. At sea, they participated in virtually every important naval battle, serving aboard warships and privateers on the Great Lakes, the Atlantic, and the Pacific.

Marines fought under Commodore Oliver Hazard Perry on Lake Erie and under Commodore Isaac Chauncey on Lake Ontario. Aboard the frigate USS Constitution, Marines were important factors in its victorious battles against HMS Guerriere, HMS Java, HMS Levant, and HMS Cyane. Those aboard USS Wasp saw action in the vessel's engagements with HMS Cyane, HMS Reindeer, and HMS Avon. Marines serving aboard the frigate USS United States were commended for their efficiency in its fight with HMS Macedonian.

Lieutenant Colonel Commandant Wharton died in office on September 1, 1818, in New York City and was buried in New York's Old Trinity Church Yard.

== See also ==
Military offices
Preceded by Lt. Col. William W. Burrows	Commandant of the United States Marine Corps; 1804–1818	Succeeded by Col. & Bvt Brig. Gen. Archibald Henderson (acting)
