= Continental Marines =

Naval infantry for the American side in the American Revolutionary War

- Gadsden flag, used as a standard by the Continental Marines
- Active: 10 November 1775 – April 1783
- Country: Thirteen Colonies (1775–76); United States (1776–1783)
- Branch: Continental Navy
- Type: Marines
- Role: Services on board armed vessels of the Navy; Amphibious operations Land warfare in support of the Army
- Size: 2,131 at peak
- Colors: Green
- Engagements: American Revolutionary War: Raid of Nassau; Battle of Trenton; Battle of Princeton; Penobscot Expedition

Commanders
- Notable commanders: Samuel Nicholas

The Continental Marines were the infantry marines of the American Colonies (and later the United States) during the American Revolutionary War. The organization was formed by the Continental Congress on November 10, 1775, and was disbanded in 1783.

Their mission was multi-purpose, but their most important duty was to serve as amphibious warfare, onboard security forces, providing security at naval base or shore stations, and protecting the captain of a ship and his officers. During naval engagements, in addition to manning the cannons along with the crew of the ship, infantry marine sharpshooters were stationed in the tops of a ship's masts specifically to shoot the opponent's officers and naval gunners.

In all, there were 131 Colonial Marine officers and probably no more than 2,000 enlisted Colonial Marines. Though individual Marines were enlisted for the few U.S. Naval vessels, the organization would not be re-created until 1798. Despite the gap between the disbanding of the Continental Marines and the current organization, the Continental Marines' successor, United States Marine Corps, marks November 10, 1775 as its inception.

== History ==
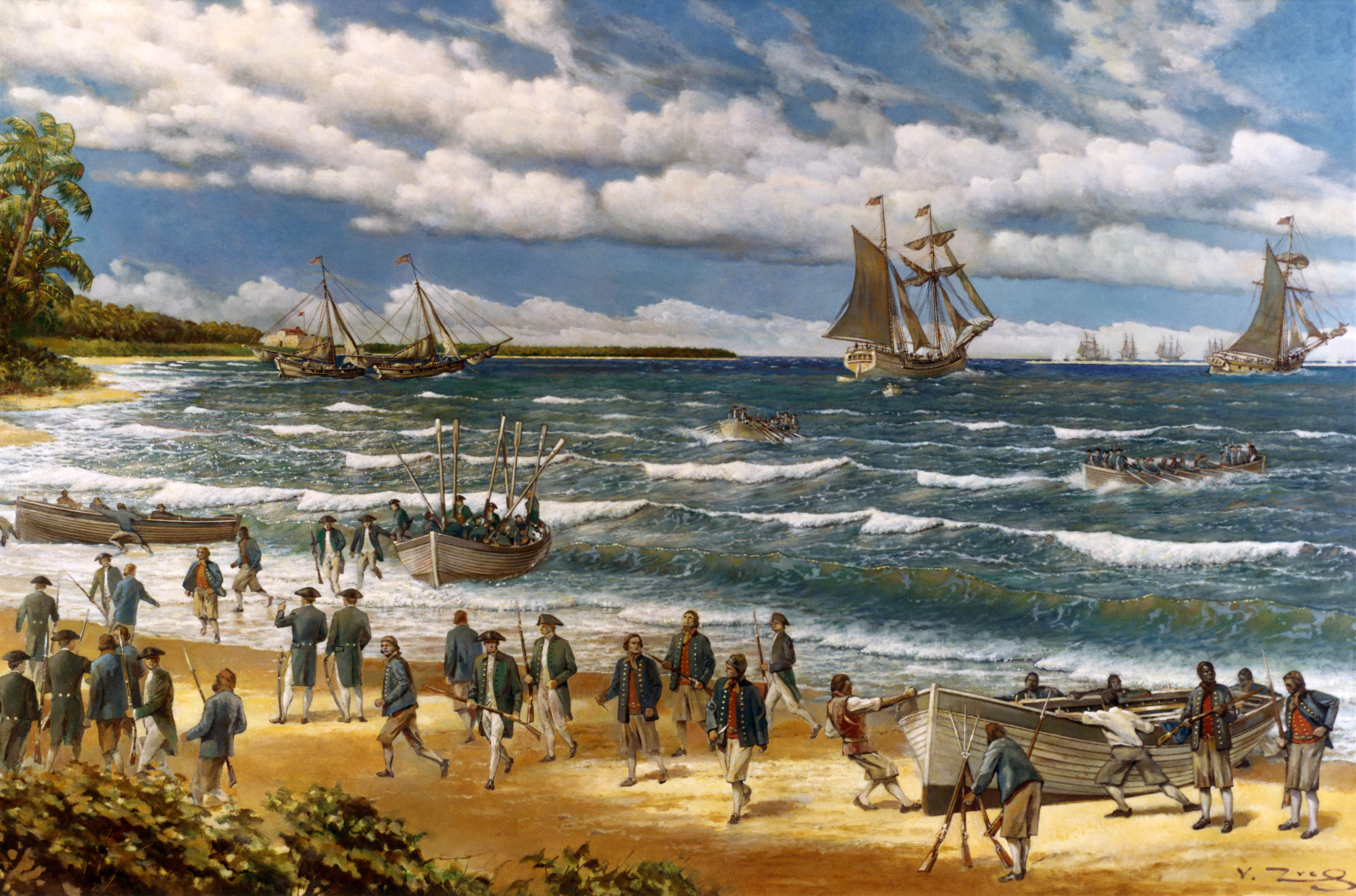
Continental Marines land at New Providence during the Battle of Nassau.

In accordance with the Continental Marine Act of 1775, Congress decreed:

That two battalions of Marines be raised consisting of one Colonel, two lieutenant-colonels, two majors and other officers, as usual in other regiments; that they consist of an equal number of privates as with other battalions, that particular care be taken that no persons be appointed to offices, or enlisted into said battalions, but such as are good seamen, or so acquainted with maritime affairs as to be able to serve for and during the present war with Great Britain and the Colonies; unless dismissed by Congress; that they be distinguished by the names of the First and Second Battalions of Marines, and that they be considered as part of the number which the Continental Army before Boston is ordered to consist of. Ordered, That a copy of the above be transmitted to the General.

These two battalions were initially intended to be drawn from George Washington's army for the planned invasion of Halifax, Nova Scotia, the main British reinforcement and supply point. In reality only one battalion was formed by December, with five companies and about 300 men. Plans to form the second battalion were suspended indefinitely after several British regiments-of-foot and cavalry, supported by 3,000 soldiers of the German British-allied contingent, landed in Nova Scotia, making the planned amphibious landing assault impossible. Washington was reluctant to support the Marines and suggested that they be recruited from New York or Philadelphia instead.

The Continental Marines' only Commandant was Captain Samuel Nicholas, commissioned on 28 November 1775; and the first Marine barracks were located in Philadelphia. Though legend places its first recruiting post at Tun Tavern, historian Edwin Simmons surmises that it was more likely the Conestoga Waggon [sic], a tavern owned by the Nicholas family. Robert Mullen, whose mother owned Tun Tavern, later received a commission as a captain in June 1776 and likely used it as his recruiting rendezvous. Four additional Marine Security Companies were raised and helped Washington defend Philadelphia.

Marines were used by the United States to carry out amphibious landings assault and raids during the American Revolution. Marines joined Commodore Esek Hopkins of the Continental Navy's first squadron on its first cruise in the Caribbean. They landed twice in Nassau, in the Bahamas, to capture naval supplies from the British. The first landing assault, named the Battle of Nassau, led by Nicholas, consisted of 250 Marines and sailors who landed in New Providence and marched to Nassau Town. There they seized naval stores of shells, shot, and cannon, but failed to capture any of the desperately needed gunpowder. The second landing, led by a Lieutenant Trevet, landed at night and captured several ships along with the naval stores.

Sailing back to Rhode Island, the squadron captured four small prize ships. The squadron returned on 8 April 1776, with 7 Marines killed and four wounded. Though Hopkins was disgraced for failing to obey orders, Nicholas was promoted to major on 25 June and tasked with raising four companies of Marines for 4 frigates that were under construction.

In December 1776, the Continental Marines were tasked to join Washington's army at Trenton to slow the progress of British troops southward through New Jersey. Unsure what to do with the Marines, Washington added the Marines to a brigade of Philadelphia militia, also dressed in green. Though they were unable to arrive in time to meaningfully affect the Battle of Trenton, they were able to fight at the Battle of Princeton.

Continental Marines landed and captured Nautilus Island and the Majabagaduce peninsula in the Penobscot Expedition, but they withdrew with heavy losses when Commodore Dudley Saltonstall's force failed to capture the nearby fort. A group under Navy Captain James Willing left Pittsburgh, traveled down the Ohio and Mississippi Rivers, captured a ship, and in conjunction with other Continental Marines, brought by ship from the Gulf of Mexico raided British Loyalists on the shore of Lake Pontchartrain. The last official act of the Continental Marines was to escort a stash of silver crowns, on loan from Louis XVI of France, from Boston to Philadelphia to enable the opening of the Bank of North America.

At the end of the Revolutionary War, both the Continental Navy and Marines were disbanded in April 1783. Although individual Marines stayed on for the few U.S. naval vessels left, the last Continental Marine was discharged in September. In all, there were 131 Colonial Marine officers and probably no more than 2,000 enlisted Colonial Marines. Though individual Marines were enlisted for the few U.S. naval vessels, the organization would not be re-created until 1798. Despite the gap between the disbanding of the Continental Marines and the establishment of the actual United States Marine Corps (USMC), the USMC deems November 10, 1775 as its official founding date. This is traditional in Marine units and is similar to the practice of the British and Dutch Marines.

== Timeline ==
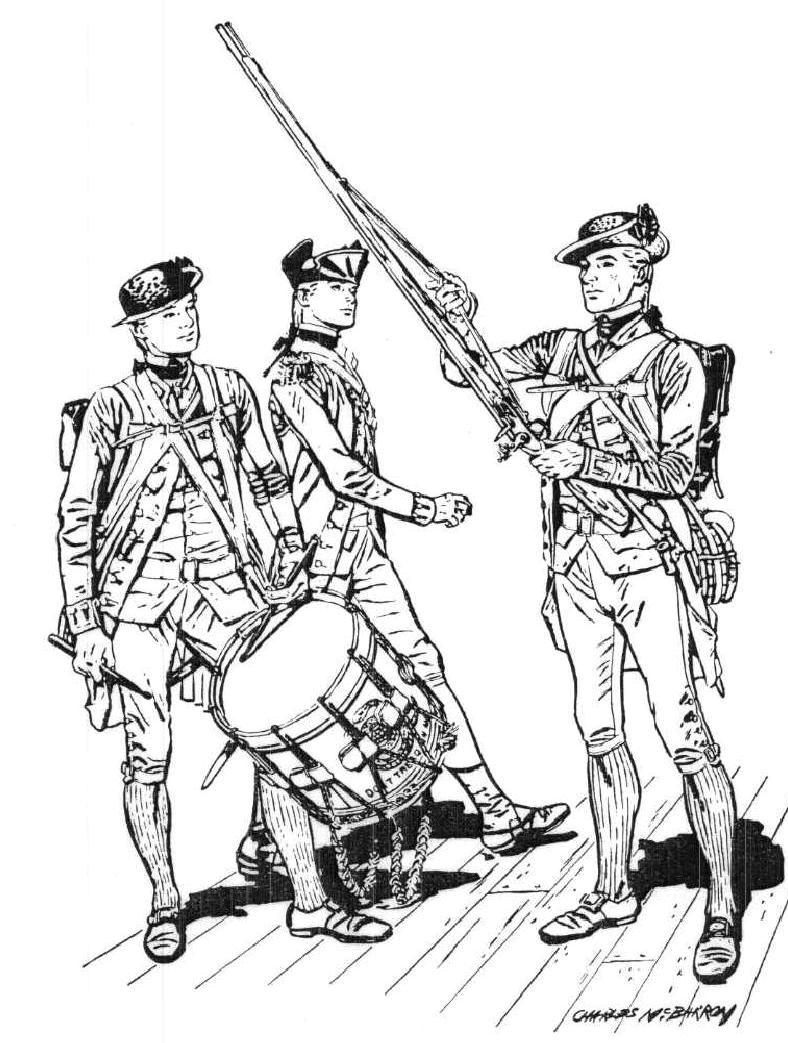
Continental marines in a shipboard role

1775, October 13
Second Continental Congress convenes and directs the acquisition, fitting out, and manning of two vessels for the Continental Navy. Since marines are a normal part of warship's complement, this is the first (albeit indirect) authorization for the enlistment of Continental Marines.

1775, November 10
The Continental Marines are created.

1775, December
Five companies of about 300 Marines are raised. While armed, they are not equipped with uniforms. They head south for the Caribbean where the five companies join Commodore Esek Hopkins of the Continental Navy's first squadron on its first cruise.

1776, March
Nicholas' Marines land on New Providence Island, Bahamas. In 13 days they secure 2 forts, occupy Nassau, control the Government House, seize 88 guns, 16,535 shells and other supplies. Returning from the raid, they encounter a British ship. Marines engage the ship with muskets and assist in manning the broadside cannon. Commodore Hopkins ignores his ambitious orders to sweep the southern seas of British ships, and instead raids the Bahamas for gunpowder for Washington's army. Nicholas' Marines make an opposed landing and march on Nassau Town, on the island of New Providence, seizing shot, shells and cannon. However, a failed attempt at a surprise attack the day before had warned the defenders, who sent off their stock of gunpowder in the night. Sailing back to Rhode Island, the squadron captures four small prize ships. Among the newly commissioned Marines is Captain Robert Mullan.

1776, April
John Martin's enlistment to serve on USS Reprisal in Philadelphia in April gives him the role as the first black Marine.

1776, October
Sergeants William Hamilton and Alexander Neilson become the first recorded Marine mustangs when they are promoted to lieutenant.

1776, December
Marines are tasked to join Washington's army at Trenton to slow the progress of British troops southward through New Jersey. Later that spring, Washington incorporates some of the Marines into artillery units of his reorganized Army.

1778, January
A Marine detachment sails down the Mississippi River and secures New Orleans to keep British traders out. Continental Marines land and capture Nautilus Island and the Majabagaduce peninsula in the Penobscot Expedition. A group under Navy Captain James Willing leave Pittsburgh, travel down the Ohio and Mississippi Rivers, capture a ship and in conjunction with other Continental Marines brought by ship from the Gulf of Mexico raid British Loyalists on the shore of Lake Pontchartrain.

1778, April 23
A Marine detachment nominally under the command of John Paul Jones makes two raids on Whitehaven and St Mary's Isle.

1783, January
Marines board and seize the British ship Baille in the West Indies

1785, June
After the end of the American Revolutionary War, the Alliance is sold. The last official act of the Continental Marines was to escort a stash of French silver crowns on loan from Louis XVI, from Boston to Philadelphia, to enable the opening of the Bank of North America. The Continental Marines and the Continental Navy are disbanded.

== Uniform ==
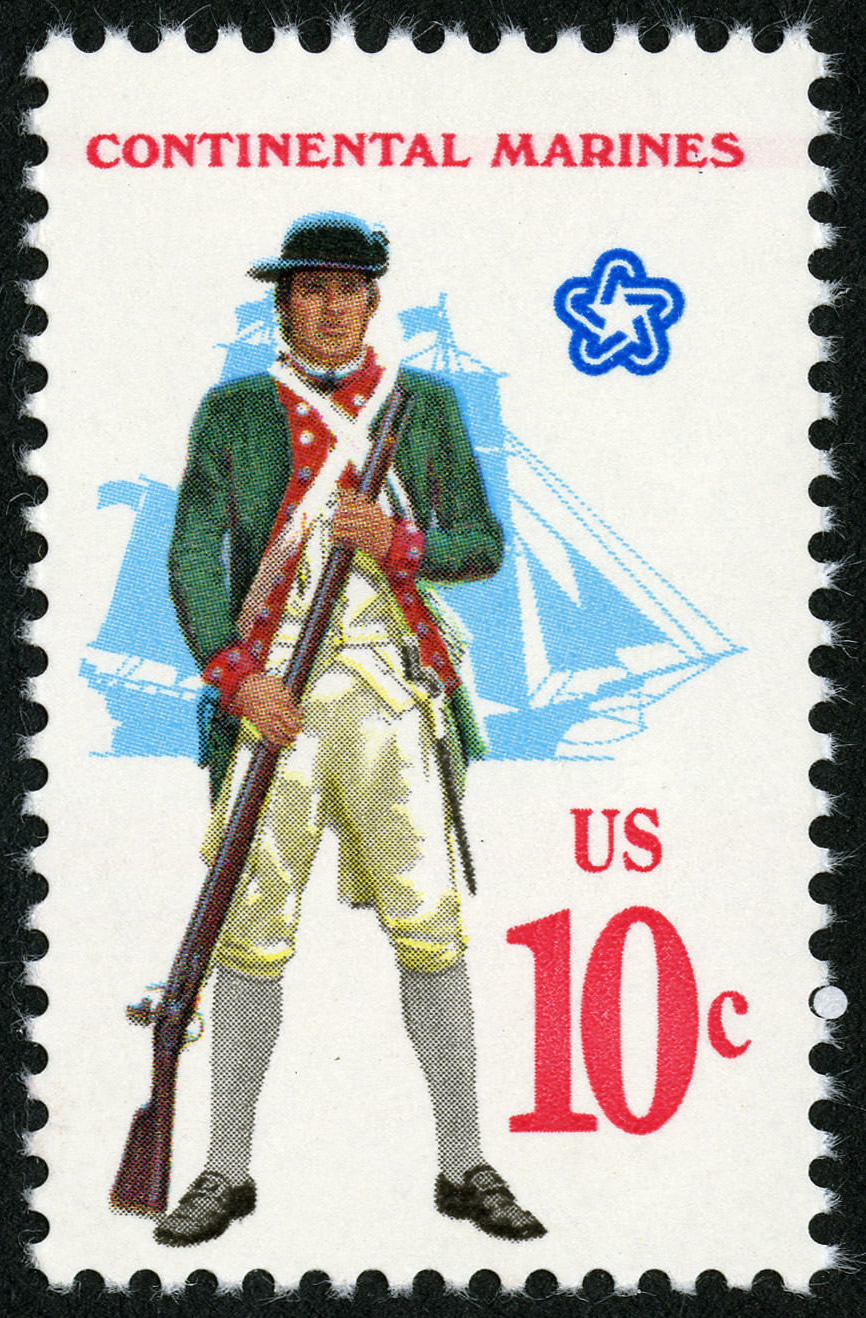
1975 postage stamp depicting the Continental Marine uniform

On September 5, 1776, the Naval Committee published the Continental Marines uniform regulations specifying green coats with white facings (lapels, cuffs, and coat lining), with a leather high collar to protect against cutlass slashes and to keep a man's head erect. Its memory is preserved by the moniker "Leatherneck", and the high collar on Marine dress uniform. Though legend attributes the green color to the traditional color of riflemen, Colonial Marines carried muskets. More likely, green cloth was simply plentiful in Philadelphia, and it served to distinguish Marines from the red of the British or the blue of the Continental Army and Navy. Also, Sam Nicholas's hunting club wore green uniforms, hence his recommendation to the committee was for green. Another possible reason for the green coats with white facings is that they were using captured uniforms as many loyalist units such as the Queen's Own Loyal Provincial Regiment utilized the green-faced white coats.

== See also ==
- History of the United States Marine Corps
