= USS Nicholas =

USS Nicholas may refer to the following ships of the United States Navy:

- USS Nicholas (DD-311) was a Clemson-class destroyer, launched in 1919 and one of seven destroyers lost in the Honda Point Disaster on 8 September 1923
- USS Nicholas (DD-449) was a Fletcher-class destroyer, launched in 1942 and struck in 1970
- USS Nicholas (FFG-47) is an Oliver Hazard Perry-class frigate, launched in 1983 and decommissioned in 2014
