= Commandant of the United States Marine Corps =

Senior-most officer and service chief of the United States Marine Corps

Commandant of the Marine Corps
- Emblem of the Marine Corps

- Flag of the commandant of the Marine Corps

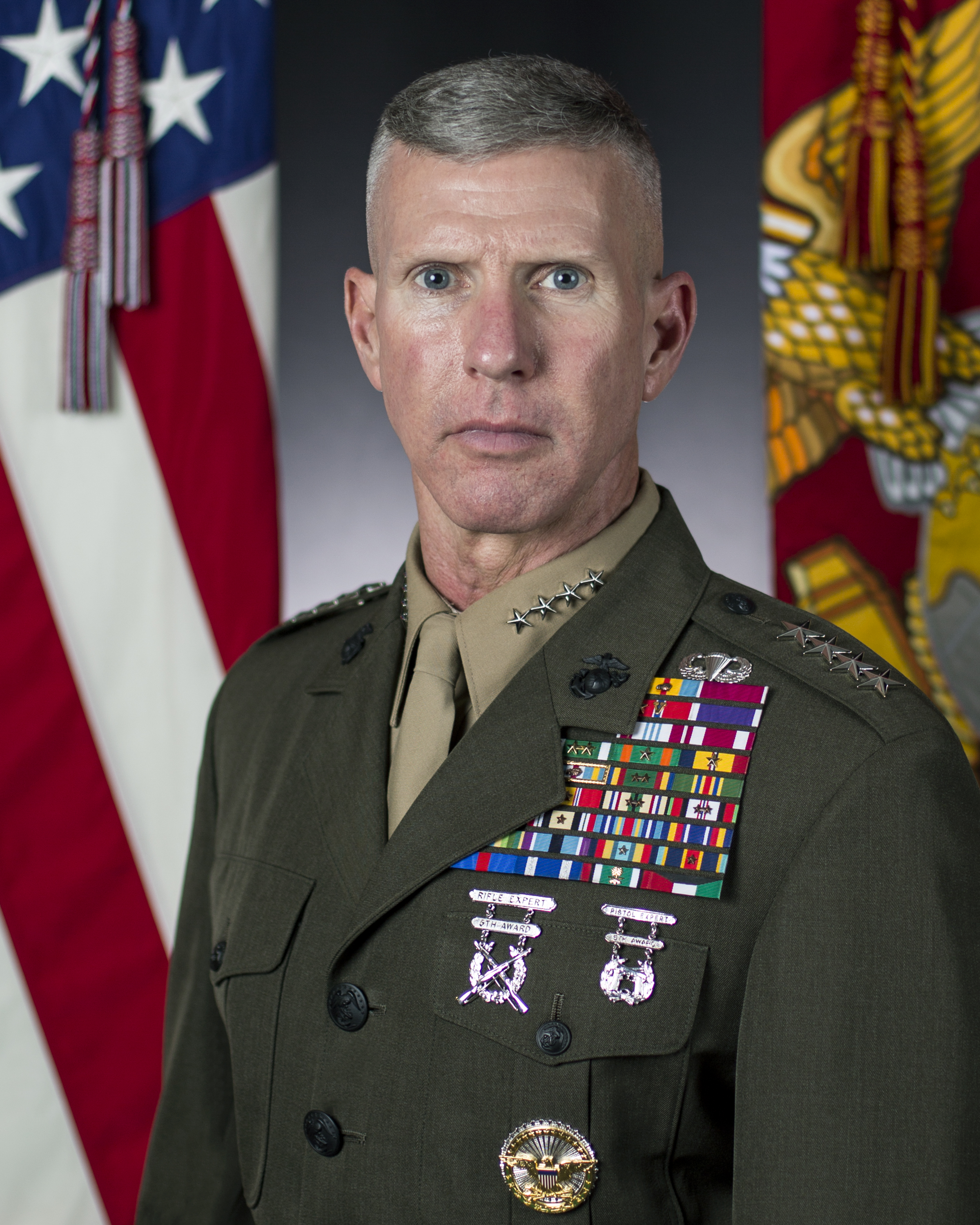
- Incumbent; General Eric M. Smith since 22 September 2023
- United States Marine Corps; Headquarters Marine Corps
- Abbreviation: CMC
- Member of: Joint Chiefs of Staff
- Reports to: Secretary of Defense; Secretary of the Navy
- Residence: Marine Barracks, Washington, D.C.
- Seat: The Pentagon, Arlington County, Virginia, U.S.
- Appointer: The president; with Senate advice and consent
- Term length: 4 years; Renewable one time, only during war or national emergency
- Constituting instrument: 10 U.S.C. § 8043
- Formation: 10 November 1775^{de facto}, 12 July 1798^{de jure}
- First holder: Samuel Nicholas
- Deputy: Assistant Commandant of the Marine Corps
- Website: Official website

The commandant of the Marine Corps (CMC) is normally the highest-ranking officer in the United States Marine Corps. It is a four-star general position and a member of the Joint Chiefs of Staff. The CMC reports directly to the secretary of the Navy and is responsible for ensuring the organization, policy, plans, and programs for the Marine Corps as well as advising the president, the secretary of defense, the National Security Council, the Homeland Security Council, and the secretary of the Navy on matters involving the Marine Corps. Under the authority of the secretary of the Navy, the CMC designates Marine personnel and resources to the commanders of unified combatant commands. The commandant performs all other functions prescribed in Section 8043 in Title 10 of the United States Code or delegates those duties and responsibilities to other officers in his administration in his name. As with the other joint chiefs, the commandant is an administrative position and has no operational command authority over United States Marine Corps forces.

The commandant is nominated for appointment by the president, for a four-year term of office, and must be confirmed by the Senate. The commandant can be reappointed to serve one additional term, but only during times of war or national emergency declared by Congress. By statute, the commandant is appointed as a four-star general while serving in office. "The commandant is directly responsible to the Secretary of the Navy for the total performance of the Marine Corps. This includes the administration, discipline, internal organization, training, requirements, efficiency, and readiness of the service. The Commandant is also responsible for the operation of the Marine Corps material support system." Since 1806, the official residence of the commandant has been located in the Marine Barracks in Washington, D.C., and his main offices are in Arlington County, Virginia.

The 39th and current commandant is General Eric M. Smith.

== Responsibilities ==
The responsibilities of the commandant are outlined in Title 10, Section 5043, the United States Code and the position is "subject to the authority, direction, and control of the Secretary of the Navy". As stated in the U.S. Code, the commandant "shall preside over the Headquarters, Marine Corps, transmit the plans and recommendations of the Headquarters, Marine Corps, to the Secretary and advise the Secretary with regard to such plans and recommendations, after approval of the plans or recommendations of the Headquarters, Marine Corps, by the Secretary, act as the agent of the Secretary in carrying them into effect, exercise supervision, consistent with the authority assigned to commanders of unified or specified combatant commands under chapter 6 of this title, over such of the members and organizations of the Marine Corps and the Navy as the Secretary determines, perform the duties prescribed for him by section 171 of this title and other provisions of law and perform such other military duties, not otherwise assigned by law, as are assigned to him by the President, the Secretary of Defense, or the Secretary of the Navy".

== List of commandants ==
Thirty-nine men have served as the commandant of the Marine Corps. The first commandant was Samuel Nicholas, who took office as a captain, though there was no office titled "Commandant" at the time, and the Second Continental Congress had authorized that the senior-most Marine could take a rank up to Colonel. The longest-serving was Archibald Henderson, sometimes referred to as the "Grand old man of the Marine Corps" due to his 39-year tenure. In the history of the United States Marine Corps, only one commandant has ever been fired from the job: Anthony Gale, as a result of a court-martial in 1820.

No.	Portrait	Commandant of the Marine Corps	Took office	Left office	Time in office	Notes
1	Samuel Nicholas	Major; Samuel Nicholas (1744–1790)	28 November 1775	27 August 1783	7 years, 272 days	The first de facto Commandant for his role as the senior-most officer of the Continental Marines.
2	William W. Burrows	Lieutenant Colonel; William W. Burrows (1758–1805)	12 July 1798	6 March 1804	5 years, 238 days	The first de jure Commandant, he started many important organizations within the Marine Corps, including the United States Marine Band
3	Franklin Wharton	Lieutenant Colonel; Franklin Wharton (1767–1818)	7 March 1804	1 September 1818	14 years, 178 days	The first commandant to be court-martialed (acquitted) and the first to occupy the commandant's house at the Marine Barracks, Washington, D.C.
-	Archibald Henderson	Major; Archibald Henderson (1783–1859); Acting	16 September 1818	2 March 1819	167 days	Acting Commandant, would later serve as Commandant from 1820 to 1859
4	Anthony Gale	Lieutenant Colonel; Anthony Gale (1782–1843)	3 March 1819	8 October 1820	1 year, 219 days	The second Commandant to be court-martialed and the only Commandant to be fired. Burial location is unknown and no authenticated images have ever been located.
5	Archibald Henderson	Brigadier General; Archibald Henderson (1783–1859)	17 October 1820	6 January 1859	38 years, 81 days	The longest-serving Commandant; known as the "Grand old man of the Marine Corps"; known for his role in expanding the Marine Corps' mission to include expeditionary warfare and rapid deployment
6	John Harris	Colonel; John Harris (1793–1864)	7 January 1859	1 May 1864	5 years, 115 days	Commandant during most of the American Civil War
7	Jacob Zeilin	Brigadier General; Jacob Zeilin (1806–1880)	10 June 1864	31 October 1876	12 years, 143 days	Became the Marine Corps' first general officer, officially approved of the design of the Eagle, Globe, and Anchor as the emblem of the Marine Corps
8	Charles G. McCawley	Colonel; Charles G. McCawley (1827–1891)	1 November 1876	29 January 1891	14 years, 89 days	Chose "Semper Fidelis", Latin for "Always Faithful", as the official Marine Corps motto
9	Charles Heywood	Major General; Charles Heywood (1839–1915)	30 June 1891	2 October 1903	12 years, 94 days	Chose "Semper Fidelis", Latin for "Always Faithful", as the official Marine Corps motto; he was the first Commandant to reach the rank of Major General
10	George F. Elliott	Major General; George F. Elliott (1846–1931)	3 October 1903	30 November 1910	7 years, 58 days	Successfully resisted attempts to remove seagoing Marines from capital ships and to merge the Corps into the United States Army
11	William P. Biddle	Major General; William P. Biddle (1853–1923)	3 February 1911	24 February 1914	3 years, 21 days	Established the Advanced Base Force, forerunner of today's Fleet Marine Force
12	George Barnett	Major General; George Barnett (1859–1930)	25 February 1914	30 June 1920	6 years, 126 days	Served as Commandant during World War I, which caused a huge increase in personnel during his term
13	John A. Lejeune	Major General; John A. Lejeune (1867–1942)	1 July 1920	4 March 1929	8 years, 246 days	Started the tradition of the birthday ball with Marine Corps Order 47, still read annually. Commanded a US Army division (the 2nd Infantry Division) in combat during World War I.
14	Wendell C. Neville	Major General; Wendell C. Neville (1870–1930)	5 March 1929	8 July 1930	1 year, 125 days	Recipient of the Medal of Honor and Marine Corps Brevet Medal
15	Ben H. Fuller	Major General; Ben H. Fuller (1870–1937)	9 July 1930	28 February 1934	3 years, 234 days	Consolidated the Fleet Marine Force concept
16	John H. Russell Jr.	Major General; John H. Russell Jr. (1872–1947)	1 March 1934	30 November 1936	2 years, 274 days	The system of seniority promotions of officers was changed to advancement by selection, the 1st Marine Brigade was withdrawn from Haiti, and the number of ships carrying Marine detachments continued to increase.
17	Thomas Holcomb	Lieutenant General; Thomas Holcomb (1879–1965)	1 December 1936	31 December 1943	7 years, 30 days	Expanded the Corps almost 20 times in size for World War II and integrated women into the Corps. The first Marine to be advanced (after retirement) to the rank of General
18	Alexander Vandegrift	General; Alexander Vandegrift (1887–1973)	1 January 1944	31 December 1947	3 years, 364 days	Recipient of the Medal of Honor. Was the first active duty Marine to hold the rank of General, resisted attempts to merge the Corps with the Army
19	Clifton B. Cates	General; Clifton B. Cates (1893–1970)	1 January 1948	31 December 1951	3 years, 364 days	Recipient of the Navy Cross. Commandant during early stage of the Korean War.
20	Lemuel C. Shepherd Jr.	General; Lemuel C. Shepherd Jr. (1896–1990)	1 January 1952	31 December 1955	3 years, 364 days	Recipient of the Navy Cross and last World War I veteran to be Commandant. First Commandant to serve on the Joint Chiefs of Staff. Commandant during the Korean War.
21	Randolph M. Pate	General; Randolph M. Pate (1898–1961)	1 January 1956	31 December 1959	3 years, 364 days	Commandant between U.S. involvement in the Korean War and Vietnam War.
22	David M. Shoup	General; David M. Shoup (1904–1983)	1 January 1960	31 December 1963	3 years, 364 days	Recipient of the Medal of Honor. Opposed U.S. involvement in South Vietnam based on strategy and undue influence of corporations and military officials in foreign policy. Historians consider Shoup's criticisms to be among the most pointed and high-profile leveled by a veteran against the Vietnam War.
23	Wallace M. Greene Jr.	General; Wallace M. Greene Jr. (1907–2003)	1 January 1964	31 December 1967	3 years, 364 days	Oversaw the expansion of the Corps role in the Vietnam War
24	Leonard F. Chapman Jr.	General; Leonard F. Chapman Jr. (1913–2000)	1 January 1968	31 December 1971	3 years, 364 days	Was the commandant during the final years of U.S. involvement in the Vietnam War. During his period in command, the III Marine Amphibious Force withdrew from Vietnam and the strength of the Corps dropped from a peak of 289,000 to 198,000.
25	Robert E. Cushman Jr.	General; Robert E. Cushman Jr. (1914–1985)	1 January 1972	30 June 1975	3 years, 180 days	Oversaw the withdrawal of the Marines from Vietnam and a decline in the Corps' peacetime strength to 194,000
26	Louis H. Wilson Jr.	General; Louis H. Wilson Jr. (1920–2005)	1 July 1975	30 June 1979	3 years, 364 days	Recipient of the Medal of Honor for capture of Guam
27	Robert H. Barrow	General; Robert H. Barrow (1922–2008)	1 July 1979	30 June 1983	3 years, 364 days	Last World War II veteran to be Commandant. Was the first Commandant to serve as a full member of the Joint Chiefs of Staff, acquired approval of production of the American-modified Harrier aircraft, and several other improvements to enhance the effectiveness of the Marine Corps
28	Paul X. Kelley	General; Paul X. Kelley (1928–2019)	1 July 1983	30 June 1987	3 years, 364 days	Commandant when the Marine Barracks bombing occurred in Beirut during the 1982–84 multinational force peacekeeping mission under the Reagan Administration.
29	Alfred M. Gray Jr.	General; Alfred M. Gray Jr. (1928–2024)	1 July 1987	30 June 1991	3 years, 364 days	The Alfred M. Gray Research Center at Marine Corps Base Quantico houses the Marine Corps Archives and Special Collections, the Quantico Base Library, and the research library for the Marine Corps University. As a reminder that the primary role of every Marine is a rifleman, he had his official photograph taken in the Camouflage Utility Uniform, the only Commandant to have done so. Last Korean War veteran to serve as Commandant.
30	Carl E. Mundy Jr.	General; Carl E. Mundy Jr. (1935–2014)	1 July 1991	30 June 1995	3 years, 364 days	After retirement, he served as president and CEO of the United Service Organizations (USO), and was the chairman of the Marine Corps University Foundation.
31	Charles C. Krulak	General; Charles C. Krulak (born 1942)	1 July 1995	30 June 1999	3 years, 364 days	Son of Marine Corps Lieutenant General Victor H. Krulak. Came up with the concept of the 'Strategic Corporal' and the 'Three Block War'. Introduced The Crucible, a final test of Marine recruits.
32	James L. Jones	General; James L. Jones (born 1943)	1 July 1999	12 January 2003	3 years, 195 days	Oversaw the Marine Corps' development of MARPAT camouflage uniforms and the adoption of the Marine Corps Martial Arts Program; later became the first Marine officer to serve as Commander, U.S. European Command (USEUCOM) and NATO's Supreme Allied Commander Europe (SACEUR), then as National Security Advisor for the Obama Administration.
33	Michael W. Hagee	General; Michael W. Hagee (born 1944)	13 January 2003	13 November 2006	3 years, 304 days	Guided the Corps through the initial years of the Iraq War; Last Vietnam veteran to serve as Commandant
34	James T. Conway	General; James T. Conway (born 1947)	13 November 2006	22 October 2010	3 years, 343 days	Commanded Marine forces in the Iraq War and oversaw expansion of the Corps to 202,000 personnel. First Commandant in nearly 40 years to have not served in the Vietnam War.
35	James F. Amos	General; James F. Amos (born 1946)	22 October 2010	17 October 2014	3 years, 360 days	Oversaw the repeal of the "don't ask, don't tell" policy in the Marine Corps. First naval aviator to serve as Commandant.
36	Joseph Dunford	General; Joseph Dunford (born 1955)	17 October 2014	24 September 2015	342 days	First Commandant and second Marine to be appointed to Chairman of the Joint Chiefs of Staff.
37	Robert Neller	General; Robert Neller (born 1953)	24 September 2015	11 July 2019	3 years, 290 days	Led the integration of women into combat roles. Made administrative regulations for Marines on social media.
38	David H. Berger	General; David H. Berger (born 1959)	11 July 2019	10 July 2023	3 years, 364 days	Issued guidance for Service-level planning to include refocusing on high-end combat, shifting away from tanks and artillery in favor of long-range missiles and drones.
-		General; Eric M. Smith (born c. 1964)	10 July 2023	22 September 2023	74 days	Served as acting commandant after Berger's retirement amid Senator Tommy Tuberville's hold on military nominations, and sworn in following confirmation.
39		General; Eric M. Smith (born c. 1964)	22 September 2023	Incumbent	3 years, 32 days	Served as acting commandant after Berger's retirement amid Senator Tommy Tuberville's hold on military nominations, and sworn in following confirmation.

== See also ==
- Assistant Commandant of the Marine Corps
- Military Secretary to the Commandant of the Marine Corps
- Sergeant Major of the Marine Corps
