= Samuel Nicholas =

Continental Marines officer (1744–1790)

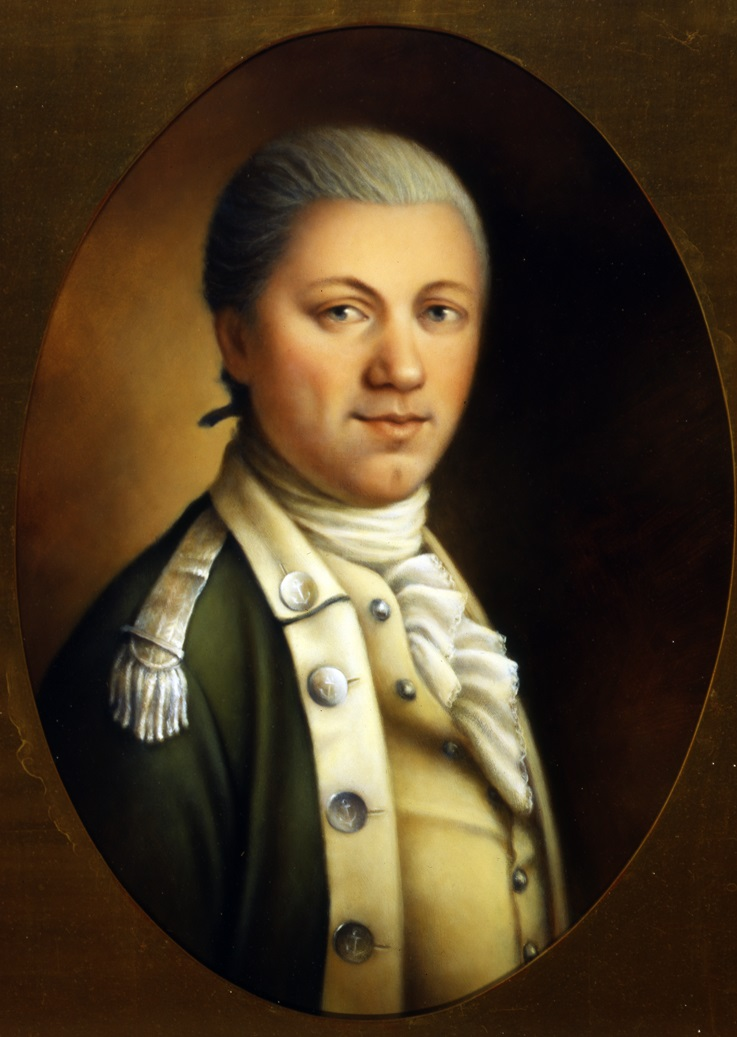
- 1989 portrait
- Born: 1744; Philadelphia, Province of Pennsylvania, British America
- Died: 27 August 1790 (aged 45–46); Philadelphia, Pennsylvania, U.S.
- Burial place: Arch Street Friends Meeting House, Philadelphia
- Military career
- Allegiance: United Colonies; United States
- Branch: Continental Marines
- Service years: 1775–1783
- Rank: Major
- Conflicts: American Revolutionary War: Battle of Nassau; Battle of Trenton; Battle of Princeton

Major Samuel Nicholas (1744 – August 27, 1790) was a Continental Marines officer who was the first officer to be commissioned into the force (predecessor to the United States Marine Corps) and by tradition is considered to be the first Commandant of the Marine Corps.

== Early life ==
Nicholas was born in Philadelphia, Pennsylvania, in 1744, the youngest of three, to Anthony and Mary (Shute Cowman) Nicholas. His father was a blacksmith, un-Friended by the Philadelphia Meeting in 1749 for "Evil Conduct in frequent drinking strong Liquor to Excess", and died when Samuel was 7. His mother, Mary Shute Nicholas, had died the year before. He was then taken in by his uncle, Attwood Shute, the Mayor of Philadelphia (1756–1758). In January 1752, his uncle enrolled him at the Academy and College of Philadelphia (now the University of Pennsylvania), the secondary-school counterpart of the College. Nicholas was a student there until the end of 1759. While at school, he became a Freemason who belonged to a Masonic Lodge that often met at Tun Tavern.

== Military service ==
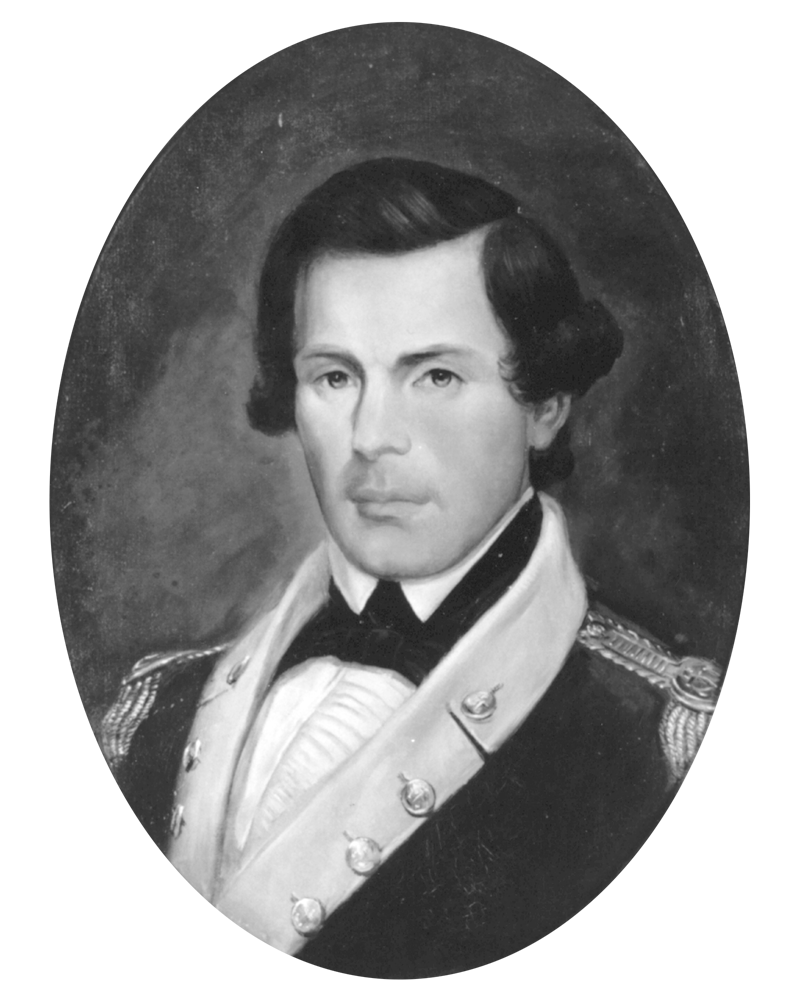
Historic Marine Corps portrait of Nicholas

On November 28, 1775, Nicholas was commissioned a "Captain of Marines" by the Second Continental Congress, which was the first commission issued in the Continental Naval Service. Eighteen days prior, the Continental Congress resolved on November 10, 1775,

That two battalions of Marines be raised consisting of one Colonel, two Lieutenant-Colonels, two Majors, and other officers, as usual in other regiments; that they consist of an equal number of Privates with other battalions; that particular care be taken that no persons be appointed to offices, or enlisted into said battalions, but such as are good seamen, or so acquainted with maritime affairs as to be able to serve by sea when required; that they be enlisted and commissioned to serve for and during the present war with Great Britain and the Colonies, unless dismissed by order of Congress; that they be distinguished by the names of the First and Second Battalion of Marines.

Captain Nicholas no sooner received official confirmation of his appointment to office than he established recruiting headquarters in Philadelphia. It is famous in Marine Corps history that his first recruitment drive was held at Tun’s Tavern. This is also where many consider that he was first commissioned to the Marine Corps by the Second Continental Congress. By January 1776, having recruited a sufficient number of Marines for the vessels that comprised the Continental Navy in the waters of Philadelphia, Capt. Nicholas assumed command of the Marine Detachment on board the Alfred. With Commodore Esek Hopkins in command, the Alfred set sail from Philadelphia on the morning of January 4, 1776.

== Battle of Nassau ==
Lord Dunmore, the royal governor of Virginia, had collected a store of arms and provisions at New Providence, in the Bahamas. Dunmore's forces had done a great deal of injury along the Colonial coast, especially the shore of Virginia. Commodore Hopkins had been ordered to proceed to Abaco in the Bahamas, and from there to operate against the forces of Lord Dunmore. Commodore Hopkins decided to make an attack on New Providence, capture the enemy's stores, and destroy his supplies. Capt Nicholas was placed in command of the landing party of 234 Marines. This attack, the first successful landing engaged in by Continental Marines, saw the capture of Nassau on March 3, 1776, without a fight.

On April 6, 1776, the Marines participated in the first naval battle between an American squadron and a British warship, when HMS Glasgow came upon the squadron.

== Promoted to major ==
On June 25, 1776, Congress placed Nicholas "at the head of the Marines with the rank of Major". Accordingly, Commodore Hopkins was advised to send Major Nicholas to Philadelphia, with dispatches for the Continental Congress. With notification of his promotion, he was ordered to report to the Marine Committee. The Committee detached him from the Alfred and ordered him to remain in the city, "to discipline four companies of Marines and prepare them for service as Marine guards for the frigates on the stocks". Having recruited and thoroughly organized the companies, he requested arms and equipment for them.

== 1776–1779 ==
In December 1776, Major Nicholas wrote to Congress: "The enemy having overrun the Jerseys, and our army being greatly reduced, I was ordered to march with three of the companies to be under the command of His Excellency, the Commander-in-Chief." This was the first example of a battalion of Marines about to serve as an actual fighting unit under the direct command of Army authority. The Marines did not, however, engage in the attack on Trenton, on December 26, 1776, which followed General George Washington's crossing of the Delaware River. They were attached to General John Cadwalader's division, which was ordered to cross the Delaware to Burlington, New Jersey, south of Trenton, in concert with Washington's crossing to the north on the night of December 25, 1776, but was turned back due to ice floes on the river.

After the first Battle of Trenton, the battalion of Marines under the command of Maj. Nicholas participated in a battle with a detachment of Cornwallis's main army at Princeton, New Jersey. During the ensuing months, Nicholas's battalion served both as infantry and artillery, participating in several skirmishes.

Following the British evacuation of Philadelphia in June 1778, the Marine Barracks were reestablished and recruiting resumed. From then until the close of the war, Nicholas's duties at Philadelphia were similar to those of later Commandants. Moreover, he was actively in charge of recruiting and sometimes acted as Muster Master of the Navy.

On November 20, 1779, Nicholas wrote Congress to request he be put in charge of the Marine Detachment aboard the 74-gun ship of the line America, then being constructed in Portsmouth, New Hampshire. However, Congress was firm in its intention that Nicholas remain in Philadelphia. Upon her completion, the America was presented to France as a gift.

After that, despite his requests to lead the Marine detachment on another ship, he mostly oversaw recruiting and training efforts. "I consequently had the mortification to become ... a useless officer," he wrote, "at least in sense of danger."

== Return to civilian life ==
After the Navy and Continental Marines were disbanded following the end of the American Revolutionary War in 1783, Nicholas returned to civilian life and became an original member of the Pennsylvania Society of the Cincinnati.

He died on August 27, 1790, in Philadelphia during an epidemic of yellow fever and is buried in the Friends Graveyard at Arch Street Friends Meeting House.

== Legacy ==
Three ships in the United States Navy have been named the USS Nicholas in his honor.

In June 2013, a dedication ceremony was held for a gray-marble marker on Nichols burial site at the Friends Cemetery at the Arch Street Friends Meeting in Philadelphia, one of very few markers allowed in the graveyard.

Annually, on November 10, the date celebrated as the Marine Corps' birthday, a wreath is placed on Nicholas's grave at dawn by a detachment of Marines.

== See also ==
- Commandant of the Marine Corps
- History of the United States Marine Corps
- List of historic United States Marines

Military offices
Preceded by New creation	Commandant of the United States Marine Corps; 1775–1783	Succeeded by Lt.Col. William Ward Burrows I (in 1798)
