= Tun Tavern =

Former tavern in Philadelphia, Pennsylvania

Coordinates: 39.9471°N 75.1417°W

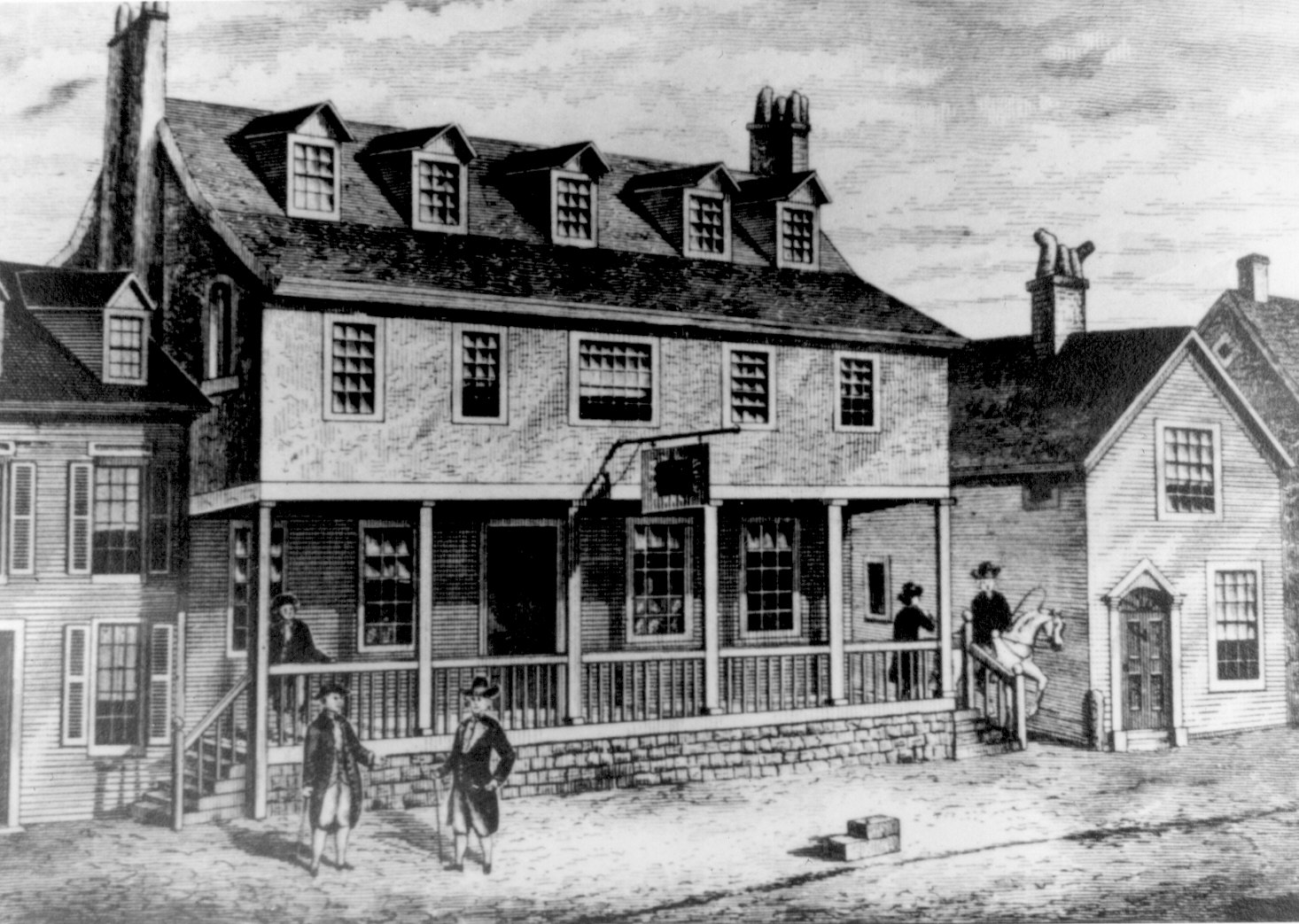
- Sketch of the original Tun Tavern

General information
- Location: Philadelphia, Pennsylvania, U.S., United States
- Opened: 1686
- Destroyed: 1781
- Client: Benjamin Franklin; George Washington; Thomas Jefferson
- Owner: Robert Mullan
- Affiliation: St. George Society of Philadelphia; Grand Lodge of Pennsylvania; St. Andrew's Society; Pennsylvania militia; Continental Congress

Design and construction
- Architect: Joshua Carpenter

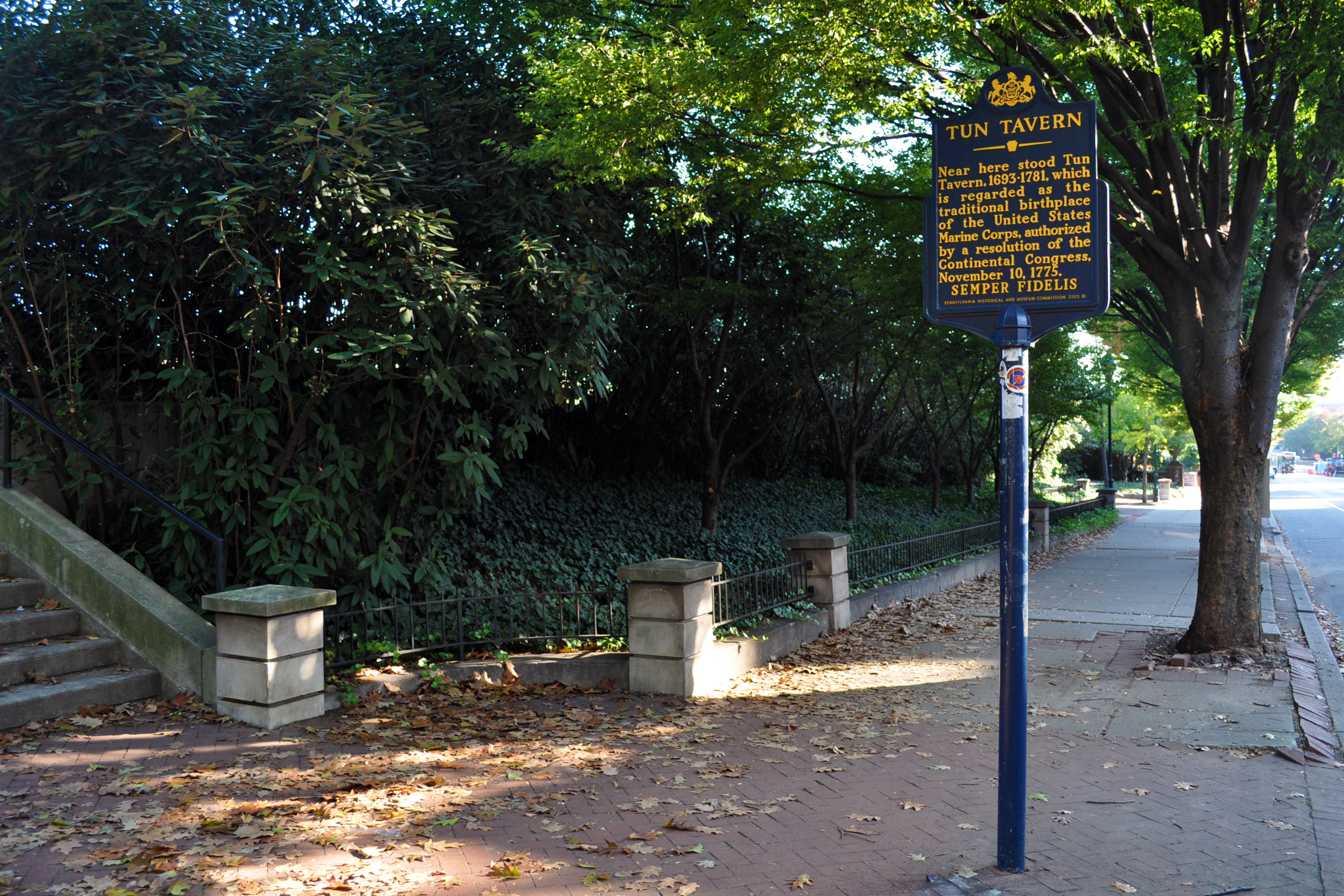
Tun Tavern historical marker at South Front and Sansom Streets in Philadelphia

Tun Tavern was a tavern and brewery in Philadelphia, Pennsylvania, which was a founding or early meeting place for a number of notable groups. It is traditionally regarded as the site where what became the United States Marine Corps held its first recruitment drive during the American Revolution. It is also regarded as one of the "birthplaces of Masonic teachings in America".

== History ==
=== Founding ===
The tavern was erected in 1686 at the intersection of King (later called Water) Street and Tun Alley by settler Joshua Carpenter, brother of Samuel Carpenter, a Quaker merchant who made a fortune trading in Barbados. Joshua Carpenter built the Tun on the carriageway that led to Carpenter's Wharf. Tun Tavern was named for the Old English word "tun", meaning a barrel or keg of beer. In the 1740s, a restaurant appellation, "Peggy Mullan's Red Hot Beef Steak Club" was added to the name of the tavern.

=== Organizations founded in the tavern ===
Tun Tavern hosted the first meetings of a number of organizations. In 1720, the first meetings of the St. George's Society (a charitable organization founded to assist needy Englishmen arriving in the new colony—predecessor of today's Sons of the Society of St. George) were held there. In 1732, the tavern hosted the first meetings of St. John's Lodge No. 1 of the Grand Lodge of the Masonic Temple. The Masonic Temple of Philadelphia recognizes Tun Tavern as the birthplace of Masonic teachings in America. In 1747, Tun Tavern became the founding place of the St. Andrew's Society, which like the St. George's Society, helped newly arrived Scots.

Tun Tavern was a significant meeting place for other groups and individuals. In 1756, Benjamin Franklin used the inn as a recruitment gathering point for the Pennsylvania militia as it prepared to fight Indian uprisings. The tavern later hosted a meeting of George Washington, Thomas Jefferson and the Continental Congress. In October 1775 a seven man Naval Committee including John Adams appointed by Congress crafted articles of war to build America's first naval fleet.

According to tradition, Tun Tavern was where the United States Marines held their first recruitment drive. On November 10, 1775, the Second Continental Congress commissioned the innkeeper and former Quaker Samuel Nicholas to raise two battalions of Marines in Philadelphia. The tavern’s manager, Robert Mullan, was the "chief Marine Recruiter". Though legend places its first recruiting post at Tun Tavern, the historian Edwin Simmons surmises that it was more likely the Conestoga Waggon [sic], a tavern owned by the Nicholas family. The first Continental Marine company was composed of one hundred Rhode Islanders commanded by Captain Nicholas. Each year on November 10, U.S. Marines worldwide toast the memory of this colonial inn as the officially-acknowledged birthplace of their service branch. The earliest Marines were deployed aboard Continental Congress Navy vessels as sharpshooters because they were typically recruited as outstanding marksmen.

=== Present day ===
In 1781, near the end of the American Revolution, Tun Tavern burned down. Its former structure stood at a location now occupied by Interstate 95, where it passes Penn's Landing. Tun Alley once existed between Walnut and Chestnut Streets east of Front Street. A commemorative marker on the east side of Front Street indicates the site, across from Sansom Walk.

In homage to the likely 1775 Tun Tavern menu, the U.S. Marine Corps National Museum located in Quantico, Virginia, contains a Tun Tavern-themed restaurant, whose lunch menu includes beer and other fermented (alcoholic) beverages, peanut soup and bread pudding, the non-alcoholic recipe of which remains a traditional staple among some U.S. Marine food services to this day.

== See also ==
- History of the United States Marine Corps
- United States Marine Corps birthday ball
