= Newcome =

Newcome is a surname. Notable people with the surname include:

== People ==
- Frederick Clive Newcome, (1847–1894), English Landscape painter, chiefly in watercolours
- Henry Newcome (1627–1695), English nonconformist preacher and activist
- James Newcome DL (born 1953), the current bishop of Carlisle in the Diocese of Carlisle
- John Newcome (politician) (died 1938), independent Irish politician
- John Newcome (academic) (died 1765), academic and priest
- Peter Newcome (1715–1779), English educator and Fellow of the Royal Society
- Peter Newcome (antiquary) (1727–1797), English cleric, known as an antiquarian
- Richard Newcome (1701–1769), English bishop of Llandaff and bishop of St Asaph
- Susanna Newcome (1685–1763), English theologian
- Thomas Warren Newcome (1923–2011), American lawyer, judge, and politician
- William Newcome (1729–1800), Englishman and cleric of the Church of Ireland
- William Newcome (cricketer) (1813–1897), English clergyman and a cricketer
- Newcome Cappe (1733–1800), English unitarian divine

== See also ==
- Colonel Newcome, the Perfect Gentleman, a 1920 British silent historical drama film
- Daniel T. Newcome Double House, also known as Brady Manor, on the Brady Street Hill in Davenport, Iowa, United States
- Colonel Newcome (play), 1906 play by the British writer Michael Morton
- Newcombe, surname
- Newcomb (disambiguation)
- Newcomen (disambiguation)
- Newcomer (disambiguation)
