= Newcomb (surname) =

Newcomb is a surname. Notable people with the name include:

- Anthony Newcomb (1941–2018), American musicologist
- Bernard A. Newcomb, American businessperson and philanthropist, co-founder of E*TRADE
- Bryant B. Newcomb (1867–1945), American politician
- Carman Newcomb (1830–1902), American politician, lawyer and judge
- Cyrenius A. Newcomb Sr. (1837–1915), American businessman, reformer, and philanthropist
- Daniel Newcomb (1747–1818), justice of the New Hampshire Supreme Court
- Deborah Newcomb (born 1954), member of the Ohio House of Representatives
- George Newcomb (1866–1895), outlaw of the American Old West and member of the Wild Bunch
- Frank H. Newcomb (1846–1934), commodore in the United States Revenue Cutter Service
- Harvey Newcomb (1803–1863), American clergyman and writer
- Horatio C. Newcomb (1821–1882), American attorney, judge, and politician
- James Pearson Newcomb (1837–1907), journalist and Secretary of State of Texas
- John Lloyd Newcomb (1881–1954), American educator
- Josephine Louise Newcomb (1816–1901), American philanthropist whose grant founded H. Sophie Newcomb Memorial College
- Josiah T. Newcomb (1868–1944), New York politician
- Mary Newcomb (1893–1966), American actress
- Michael Newcomb (disambiguation), multiple individuals
- Patricia Newcomb (born 1930), American film producer and publicist
- Philip Newcomb (born 1950s), American software engineer
- Rexford Newcomb (1886–1968), American academician, architect, and author
- Richard Newcomb, American war correspondent
- Robert Newcomb, fantasy writer
- Ronda Storms (born Ronda Rehnell Newcomb, 1965), American politician
- Sean Newcomb (born 1993), American baseball pitcher
- Simon Newcomb (1835–1909), Canadian astronomer and mathematician
- William Newcomb (1927–1999), American professor and theoretical physicist who devised Newcomb's paradox
- Wesley Newcomb (1818–1892), American malacologist (studier of mollusks)

== See also ==
- Newcombe, a surname
- Newcome, name
