= John Newcome =

John Newcome may refer to:

- John Newcome (politician) (died 1938), independent Irish politician
- John Newcome (academic) (1684–1765), academic and priest

== See also ==
- John Newcombe (born 1944), Australian tennis player
