= Newcombe =

Newcombe is a British surname of Brythonic origin, "-combe" or "-coombe" being cognate with the Welsh "cwm" meaning valley.

== People ==
- Anton Newcombe (born 1967), American musician
- Bertha Newcombe (1857–1947), English artist and suffrage activist
- Bobby Newcombe (born 1979), American football player
- C. P. Newcombe (1825–1913), English educator and social reformer
- Charles F. Newcombe (1851–1924), British botanist
- Don Newcombe (1926–2019), American baseball player
- Edmund Leslie Newcombe (1859–1931), Canadian lawyer and Puisne Justice of the Supreme Court of Canada
- Frederick Charles Newcombe (1858–1927), American botanist
- Hanna Newcombe (1922–2011), Canadian co-founder of Peace Research Abstracts and Peace Research Reviews
- John Newcombe (born 1944), Australian tennis player
- Justin Newcombe, New Zealand garden designer
- Kim Newcombe (1944–1973), Grand Prix motorcycle road racer from New Zealand
- Nora Newcombe (born 1951), Canadian-American psychologist
- S. F. Newcombe (1878–1956), British army officer and surveyor
- Sonja Newcombe (born 1988), American volleyball player

== Other ==
- Rural Municipality of Newcombe No. 260, Saskatchewan, Canada
- Operation Newcombe, the British contribution in 2013 to French-led military involvement in Mali

== See also ==
- Newcomb (surname)
- Newcome, name
