= Mochitsura Hashimoto =

Japanese World War II submarine commander (1909–2000)

- 橋本 以行
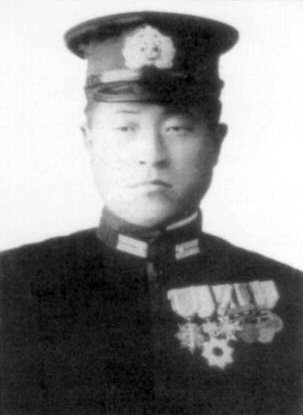
- Mochitsura Hashimoto, as a lieutenant commander (c. 1943)
- Born: 14 October 1909; Kyoto, Japan
- Died: 25 October 2000 (aged 91); Kyoto, Japan
- Military career
- Allegiance: Empire of Japan
- Branch: Imperial Japanese Navy
- Service years: 1931–1945
- Rank: Commander
- Commands: Ro-31; I-158; Ro-44; I-58
- Conflicts: Second Sino-Japanese War; World War II; Pacific War; Attack on Pearl Harbor; Battle of Okinawa; Sinking of the USS Indianapolis
- Awards: Order of the Golden Kite, 5th Class; Order of the Rising Sun, 5th Class; Order of the Sacred Treasure
- Other work: Shinto priest

Mochitsura Hashimoto (橋本 以行, Hashimoto Mochitsura; 14 October 1909 – 25 October 2000) was a Japanese officer and a submarine commander in the Imperial Japanese Navy during World War II. He was captain of the submarine I-58, which sank the American heavy cruiser USS Indianapolis in 1945 after its delivery of parts, gun and bullet, for the first atomic weapon used in wartime, Little Boy, prior to the attack on Hiroshima.

Born in Kyoto and educated at the Imperial Japanese Naval Academy, Hashimoto volunteered for service in submarines and was aboard submarine I-24 during the attack on Pearl Harbor in 1941. Hashimoto commanded coastal patrol and training submarines off Japan for much of the war, and in 1944 took command of I-58, a submarine which was equipped to carry kaiten manned torpedoes. After a number of unsuccessful operations, under the command of Hashimoto I-58 sank Indianapolis on 30 July with two Type 95 torpedoes while on a midnight patrol.

Hashimoto's submarine then returned to Japan, one of the few Japanese submarines to survive the war. Hashimoto was called to testify on behalf of the prosecution at the court-martial of Charles B. McVay III, the commanding officer of Indianapolis, a move which was controversial at the time. He was later part of an effort to exonerate McVay, which was eventually successful. Hashimoto, whose entire family died in the atomic bombing of Hiroshima, later became a Shinto priest. He died on 25 October 2000, five days before McVay's exoneration.

== Early life ==
Mochitsura Hashimoto was born in 1909 in Kyoto, Japan the eighth of nine children and fifth son of a kannushi (Shinto priest). He attended Kyoto Third High School, a prestigious school, where he performed well. In his youth he was described as self-possessed and respectful. At the behest of his father, he applied for the Imperial Japanese Naval Academy. The family did not have a naval background, but Hashimoto's father struggled financially on a priest's government subsidy and felt entering his son into the military would help to provide for them. One of Hashimoto's older brothers subsequently attended the Imperial Japanese Army Academy and was commissioned into the Imperial Japanese Army. Hashimoto graduated from high school in 1927 and was accepted into the Naval Academy. Leaving home for the first time, Hashimoto then attended the Imperial Japanese Naval Academy at Etajima for four years, studying Japanese history, engineering, and naval tactics, as well as judo and other military athletics. He graduated and commissioned in 1931.

In 1937, Hashimoto married Nobuko Miki, the daughter of a successful Osaka businessman. The couple had three sons; Mochihiro, born in 1940, Nobutake, born in 1942, and Tomoyuki, born in 1944;and Sonoe, a daughter born in 1947.

== Military career ==
In 1934, Hashimoto volunteered for the submarine service, and in 1937, he served aboard destroyers and submarine chasers off the shores of the Republic of China. On 15 November, as a sub-lieutenant, Hashimoto was assigned to the crew of the gunboat Hozu, and was promoted to lieutenant on 1 December. During that time, his brother was killed in action fighting in mainland China.

In 1938, he was assigned to the destroyer Okikaze on 15 December. Selected for submarine school the following year, Hashimoto was assigned to the Yokosuka Naval District on 20 May 1939 and enrolled in a six-month torpedo course on 1 June, subsequently entering the naval submarine school as a Class B student on 1 December. Upon completion of this training, he was assigned to the submarine I-123 on 20 March 1940 as torpedo officer, transferring to the I-155 on 15 October in the same role.

On 15 July 1941, he was assigned to the submarine I-24, becoming its torpedo officer on 31 October, under Lieutenant Commander Hiroshi Hanabusa; the ship was based out of Kure. Throughout the year, the submarine conducted training maneuvers with a group of midget submarines. On 18 November, I-24 and her group sailed from Kure with a midget submarine attached to her afterdeck. Steaming eastward, she surfaced 10 miles (16 km) off Waikiki on 6 December. The sub was a part of a large group of submarines which would support the Attack on Pearl Harbor. Hashimoto witnessed the final ritual of Kazuo Sakamaki and Kyoji Inagaki, who would man the midget submarine, which cast off at 05:30. I-24 remained at a rendezvous point to wait for the midget sub, which never came. On 9 December, I-24 steamed for Kure.

Upon the submarine's return to Kure, Hashimoto was detached and assigned to the advanced course at Submarine School on 1 February 1942, to prepare him for command of a submarine. Graduating from this course on 30 June, Hashimoto was given command of submarine Ro-31, a coastal defense vessel. For the remainder of 1942, Hashimoto operated his ship in home waters off Yokosuka training crews and trying new equipment and doing research for the development of Japanese submarine doctrine. He was promoted to lieutenant commander on 1 November. In 1943, he was given command of submarine I-158 for coastal defense, and later in the year was given command of submarine Ro-44 for the same duties.

=== Commanding I-58 ===
In May 1944, Lieutenant Commander Hashimoto was given command of submarine I-58 which was still under construction in Sasebo. Hashimoto oversaw much of the construction of I-58. The submarine was later overhauled mid-construction to carry Kaiten manned torpedoes, which was considered a great honor by Hashimoto's crew. I-58 was commissioned on 13 September 1944 and Hashimoto commanded her during her shakedown cruises, commanding his men on repeated drills without shore leave. He completed training on the submarine in December 1944. The ship traversed Shimonoseki Strait into the Inland Sea and to Kure for supplies. She then moved to Hirao where she loaded six kaitens.

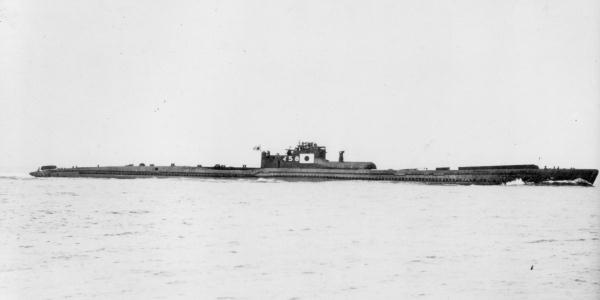
Japanese submarine I-58 in 1944

On 29 December, she left on her first war patrol, steaming for the Mariana Islands. She arrived off the coast of Guam at 03:00 on 11 January 1945 and Hashimoto ordered four kaitens launched. The kaitens tentatively claimed a tanker sunk, though it was unable to verify if the ship had actually been struck. The strike had been unsuccessful. She then sped back to Kure and arrived there on 20 January. She remained in port there until March, likely due to supply shortages. On 1 March, she was ordered to Iwo Jima to support the battle taking place there. Once there, I-58 was ordered to launch all of its kaitens without their pilots and immediately return home. She was ordered out again on 2 April sailing to support Japanese forces at the Battle of Okinawa. While there, she was attacked by aircraft 50 times. She never surfaced for more than a few hours. She limped to Kure on 29 April 1945, the only Japanese submarine to withdraw from the operation. She remained in port because of continued mining conducted by U.S. Army Air Forces, and departed on 16 July on another war patrol. At the time, she was one of only four large submarines left in the Japanese Navy, and her mission was to harass Allied lines of communications.

Passing through the Inland Sea around minefields, I-58 headed for the east coast of the Philippines intending to attack ships there. Passing east of Okinawa and spotting no ships, she cruised south arriving at the Guam-Leyte shipping lane on 27 July. She spotted a tanker escorted by a destroyer and Hashimoto ordered her to launch two kaitens at 14:31 and 14:43. She heard explosions at 15:21 and 15:31 but her crew was unable to determine if the kaitens had struck their targets. Hashimoto reported a tanker assumed sunk.

=== Sinking of Indianapolis ===
On 29 July, Lt. Cmdr. Hashimoto ordered the submarine to make for an area where he believed shipping lanes between Guam, Leyte, Peleliu and Okinawa intersected. At 23:35 that evening, Hashimoto spotted the heavy cruiser Indianapolis at 10,000 metres (33,000 ft) cruising for his position at medium speed. Believing the ship to be an "Idaho-class" battleship, he ordered I-58 to dive and once Indianapolis closed to 1,500 metres (4,900 ft) he ordered six regular torpedoes fired at 00:02 on 30 July. Spotting three explosions strike the Indianapolis, Hashimoto ordered the submarine on a deep dive fearing detection. After an hour at a deep dive to reload, she surfaced and did not spot Indianapolis. After searching unsuccessfully for flotsam or any sign of the ship, he ordered the I-58 to retire at 02:30. He transmitted a short wave radio message to the 6th Fleet headquarters in Kure at about 03:00 noting the destruction of the ship. He later wrote of the incident:

We had the moon behind us and the enemy ship was now clearly visible. She had two turrets aft and a large tower mast. I took her to be an Idaho-class battleship. The crew were all agog, awaiting the order to fire the torpedoes. All was dead quiet ... the favorable moment for firing was approaching. ... At last in a loud voice, I gave the order 'Stand by—fire!' The torpedo-release switch pressed at intervals of two seconds and then the report came from the torpedo room, "All tubes fired and correct." Six torpedoes were speeding, fanwise, toward the enemy ship. ... Bringing the boat on to a course parallel with the enemy, we waited anxiously. Every minute seemed an age. Then on the starboard side of the enemy by the forward turret, and then the after turret there rose columns of water to be followed immediately by flashes of bright red flame. Then another column of water arose from alongside the Number 2 turret and seemed to envelop the whole ship—"A hit, a hit!" I shouted as each torpedo struck home, and the crew danced for joy.

Hashimoto ordered I-58 northward looking for additional ships to attack. She picked up reports of the atomic bombing of Hiroshima in intercepted radio transmissions on 7 August but Hashimoto continued to hunt for Allied ships south of Bungo Strait. On 9 August she launched two kaitens against a convoy, and Hashimoto claimed a destroyer probably sunk. On 12 August he launched his remaining kaitens and claimed a merchant ship probably sunk. I-58 surfaced in Bungo Strait on 15 August, where Hashimoto learned of the Gyokuon-hōsō signaling the Japanese surrender and end of the war. She traveled up the Inland Sea and arrived at Hirao where Hashimoto emotionally informed his crew of the end of the war. After the war, it was confirmed Indianapolis was the only ship I-58 had sunk. It was the last Japanese naval success of World War II. When Hashimoto came home from the war, he learned that his entire family had been killed in the atomic bombing of Hiroshima on 7 August.

=== McVay court-martial ===
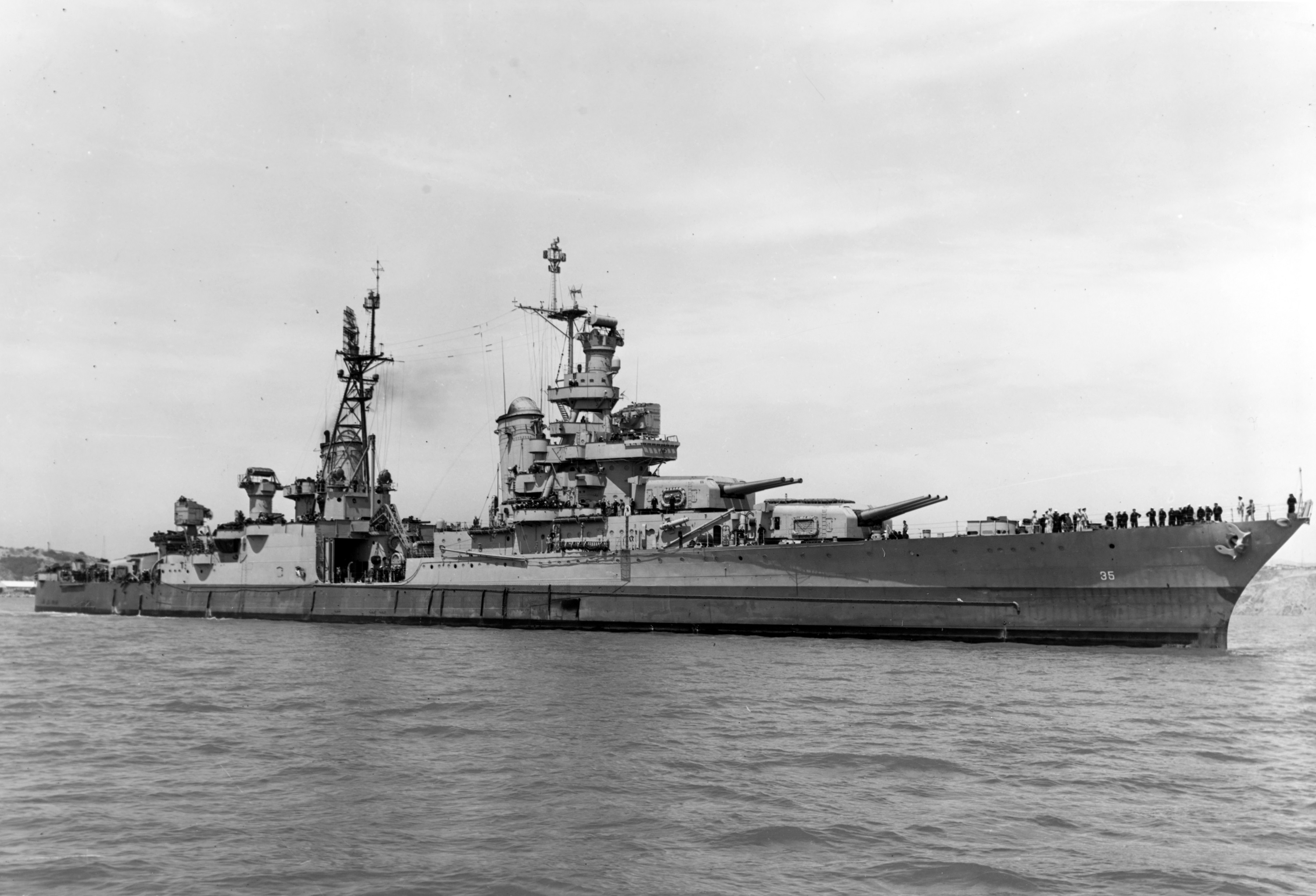
USS Indianapolis in 1945

Three days after Japan's formal surrender in Tokyo Bay, Hashimoto was promoted to his final rank of commander. On 20 November, he was given command of the destroyer Yukikaze, among the few Imperial Navy ships to survive the war, and assigned to repatriation duties, returning troops to Japan from overseas. Before Hashimoto could begin his new duties, however, he was summoned by the United States military to be a witness for the prosecution in the court-martial against Indianapolis commander Captain Charles B. McVay III, who was on trial on charges of negligence leading to the ship's sinking. On 9 December 1945 he was transported from Tokyo to Oakland, California, aboard an aircraft of the Naval Air Transport Service. Hashimoto was assured he would be treated as a naval officer instead of a prisoner of war or war criminal, but he remained under guard during his time in the United States and was not allowed to leave his hotel, as his appearance had been front-page news that day in the New York Times and in other newspapers. The next day he arrived in Washington, D.C., where hearings were taking place. For the duration of his time in the United States, he spoke through translator Francis Earl Eastlake from the Office of Naval Intelligence.

Hashimoto spoke first with judge advocate Captain Thomas J. Ryan for four hours on 11 December. He spoke the next day with Captain John P. Cady, McVay's chief defense counsel, for several hours, as both officers sought to determine his credibility and competence to take the stand in the trial. He told them the visibility was good on the night of the attack and he had been able to easily spot the Indianapolis. Hashimoto testified in the court on 13 December in a crowded courtroom. It was the first time that an officer of a nation at war with the United States had testified against an officer of the U.S. Navy in a court martial. (Note: Historian Richard Newcomb noted that commanding officers of two Continental Navy ships were tried and acquitted for the loss of their ships during the American Revolutionary War: John Manley of USS Hancock and Elisha Hinman of USS Alfred. However, no U.S. Navy officer had ever been tried in connection with the loss of his vessel in wartime.) At the behest of Cady, Hashimoto took both a Japanese civil oath and a U.S. Navy oath and so he could be charged for perjury in both nations if he lied. Hashimoto's 50 minutes of testimony focused on whether or not Indianapolis was "zigzagging" and he noted the ship did not deviate from its course. However, he also noted that its position would have made such evasive maneuvers ineffectual in thwarting his ability to attack the ship. Still, his testimony is considered integral in McVay's eventual conviction that he had been negligent. Charles Butler McVay III was exonerated in 2001. Following his appearance at the trial, Hashimoto remained in U.S. custody under guard until early 1946, when he was returned to Japan aboard USS Effingham.

With the Nuremberg Trials underway and Japanese war crimes during the war coming to light, the announcement of Hashimoto's appearance in testimony against an American officer caused considerable controversy in the American news media. Though Hashimoto was himself known to be innocent of any war crimes and was generally treated well by his guards, he spoke little English and was subject to derision in the press. Among the public responses, socialite Evalyn Walsh McLean sent an angry telegram to Secretary of the Navy James Forrestal to complain, and U.S. Representative Robert L. Doughton publicly stated, "It is the most contemptible thing I ever heard of to summon a Jap officer to testify against one of our own officers. I made my living practicing law before Navy courts and boards for 25 years, and this reaches an all-time low in courts, board or congressional investigation." Columnist Robert Ruark accused the Navy of using Hashimoto to "hype up" the court martial. Even after his departure his testimony remained controversial, and the Chicago Sun criticized his trip, which it estimated to have cost $1,820 (equivalent to $32,500 in 2025).

== Postwar career ==
After his return to Japan, Hashimoto worked as a demobilization officer with the naval section of the Ministry of Demobilization, responsible for demobilizing veterans and dismantling what remained of the Japanese Navy. He completed his final assignment in June 1946, when he became a civilian merchant shipping captain, and opted to retire from the military. When his ship accidentally collided with and sank a freighter, he was forced to resign.

Afterward, he became a Shinto priest at a shrine in Kyoto. He was later interviewed by author Dan Kurzman for his 1990 book Fatal Voyage, in which Kurzman stated, "Commander Hashimoto was amazed by the Americans. While penned up in his dormitory during the trial, he was treated more like an honored guest than an enemy officer who had caused the deaths of so many American boys." In 1954, Hashimoto authored Sunk: The Story of the Japanese Submarine Fleet, 1941–1945, in which he detailed Japanese submarine operations in the war, including an account of the sinking of Indianapolis. Noted American submarine author Captain Edward L. Beach Jr., author of Run Silent, Run Deep, wrote the introduction for the American publication of Hashimoto's book.

In December 1990, Hashimoto met with some of the survivors of the Indianapolis at Pearl Harbor, where he stated through a translator: "I came here to pray with you for your shipmates whose deaths I caused," to which survivor Giles McCoy simply responded: "I forgive you."

In 1999, he assisted the surviving crew of the Indianapolis in attempting to exonerate McVay of blame for the ship's sinking, writing a letter to the Senate Armed Services Committee in which he stated, just as he had more than five decades earlier, that even if the Indianapolis had been zigzagging, there would have been no difference: "I would have been able to launch a successful torpedo attack against his ship whether it had been zigzagging or not." Regarding McVay's conviction, Hashimoto wrote:

Our peoples have forgiven each other for that terrible war and its consequences. Perhaps it is time your peoples forgave Captain McVay for the humiliation of his unjust conviction.

Hashimoto died at the age of 91 on 25 October 2000, five days before a resolution to posthumously exonerate Captain McVay was passed by the U.S. Congress and signed by President Bill Clinton. Secretary of the Navy Richard Danzig refused to allow the language to be entered into McVay's service record. When George W. Bush became president and Gordon England became secretary of the Navy, Secretary England directed Navy captain William J. Toti, former commanding officer of USS Indianapolis (SSN-697) to enter the exoneration language into McVay's service record in May 2001.

== Bibliography ==
- Boyd, Carl; Yoshida, Ahiko (2002), The Japanese Submarine Force and World War II, Annapolis, Maryland: Naval Institute Press, ISBN 978-1-55750-015-1
- Fredriksen, John C. (2001), America's Military Adversaries: From Colonial Times to the Present, Santa Barbara, California: ABC-CLIO, ISBN 1-57607-603-2
- Harrell, David (2005), Out of the Depths, Maitland, Florida: Xulon Press, ISBN 978-1-59781-167-5
- Hashimoto, Mochitsura (2010), Sunk: The Story of the Japanese Submarine Fleet, 1941–1945, New York City, New York: Progressive Press, ISBN 978-1-61577-581-1
- Newcomb, Richard F. (2000), Abandon Ship! : The Saga of the U.S.S. Indianapolis, the Navy's Greatest Sea Disaster, New York City, New York: HarperCollins Publishers, ISBN 0-06-018471-X
- Stanton, Doug (2002), In Harm's Way: The Sinking of the U.S.S. Indianapolis and the Extraordinary Story of Its Survivors, New York City, New York: St. Martin's Press, ISBN 0-312-98337-9
- Tucker, Spencer (2011), World War II at Sea: An Encyclopedia, New York City, New York: ABC-CLIO, ISBN 978-1-59884-457-3
