= Newcomb =

Newcomb may refer to:

== People ==
- Newcomb (surname), includes a list of people with the name

== Places ==
=== Antarctica ===
- Newcomb Bay

=== Australia ===
- Newcomb, Victoria, a residential suburb

=== United States ===
- Newcomb Township, Champaign County, Illinois
- Newcomb, Maryland, an unincorporated community
- Newcomb, New Mexico, a census-designated place
- Newcomb, New York, a town
- Newcomb, Tennessee, an unincorporated community

=== Outer space ===
- Newcomb (lunar crater), named after Simon Newcomb
- Newcomb (Martian crater)

== Institutions ==
- Newcomb–Tulane College, located in New Orleans, Louisiana
- H. Sophie Newcomb Memorial College, the coordinate women's college of Tulane University
- Newcomb Art Museum, located at Tulane University, New Orleans, Louisiana
- Newcomb High School, New Mexico

== Ships ==
- USS Newcomb (DD-586), a U.S. Navy World War II destroyer, named for Frank Newcomb
- USS Simon Newcomb (AGSC-14), a U.S. Navy World War II minesweeper

== Other uses ==
- Newcomb Pottery, a brand of American Art Nouveau pottery
- Newcomb ball, a ball game that is a variation of volleyball
- Newcomb's paradox, thought experiment involving predicting the future

== See also ==
- Newcomb House (disambiguation)
