= Newcomb House =

Newcomb House may refer to:

in the United States

(by state then city)

- Newcomb House (Pasadena, California), listed on the National Register of Historic Places (NRHP) in Los Angeles County
- Richard F. Newcomb House, Quincy, Illinois, listed on the National Register of Historic Places listings in Adams County
- Newcomb Place, Quincy, Massachusetts, listed on the NRHP in Norfolk County
- John Newcomb House, Wellfleet, Massachusetts, listed on the NRHP in Barnstable County
- Newcomb House (Carthage, Missouri)
- Van Horn–Newcomb House, Englewood, New Jersey, listed on the NRHP in Bergen County
- Newcomb-Brown Estate, Pleasant Valley, New York, listed on the NRHP in Dutchess County
