= James Hardress de Warrenne Waller =

Irish inventor and engineer

James Hardress de Warrenne Waller OBE DSO
- Born: 31 July 1884; Tasmania, Australia
- Died: 9 February 1968 (aged 83); Devon, England
- Education: Queen's College Galway

James Hardress de Warrenne Waller OBE DSO (31 July 1884 – 9 February 1968), was an Irish inventor and engineer who developed building systems using concrete known as Nofrango and the Ctesiphon system.

== Early life and family ==
James Hardress de Warrenne Waller also known as James Hardress de Warenne Waller was born in Tasmania on 31 July 1884. His parents were George Arthur, a farmer, and Sarah Waller (née Atkinson). His father was from Prior Park, Nenagh, County Tipperary, and his mother was from Cangort, County Offaly. Waller was the youngest of 10 children. He was educated in Hobart, and trained under his brother, Richard FitzArthur Waller, as a pupil from 1902 to 1904. Travelling to Ireland, he studied engineering at Queen's College Galway, graduating in 1909. He then moved to University College Cork to study for an M.Sc. and ME under Conel William Long Alexander, going on to study in New York for a period.

On 25 August 1917, Waller married Beatrice Kinkead in Ireland. They had two daughters. Waller died in Devon on 9 February 1968.

== Career ==
While still in Cork, Waller submitted a design for a new bridge to replace a wooden bridge on the UCC campus, over the River Lee. It was destroyed by during storm flooding in November 1916. It was later replaced with a new bridge known as the Alumni Bridge or Newman's Bridge. Waller was then commissioned to build a bridge at Waterford, across the River Slaney, from 1911 to 1913. He formed a partnership with Alfred Dover Delap (1871–1943) under the name Delap and Waller. The partnership lasted until Delap's death, and despite Waller spending 12 years outside Ireland. At the outbreak of World War I, Waller joined the 65th field company of the Royal Engineers. He took part in the Salonika campaign, during which he experimented with tents covered in mud and snow. In 1916 he was awarded the DSO for this military service, and later in 1918, an OBE. Waller founded a company in Poole, England which manufactured concrete houses and battleships. The company only built one ship, launched just before the armistice, and one housing estate before it was bankrupted as he was out competed by those building in brick.

After the collapse of his company, Waller began to travel, first to Iraq where he saw the immense inverted catenary arch at the palace of Ctesiphon dating from the 6th century. He was then employed in northern Spain to supervise the construction of a railway. Returning to Ireland, he developed a system of construction with lightweight concrete called Nofrango (meaning "no break") in the late 1920s. Waller's first projects was at Foynes, County Limerick, building a pier using concrete filled hessian bags to create a deep-water jetty. His system was used to build a multi-storey factory for Jacob's in Dublin, which now houses the National Archives. He was also commissioned to build a housing development on Loreto Avenue, Rialto by Dublin Corporation, at a cost of £229 per house. In 1934, he co-founded the charity the Mount Street Club.

During World War II, Waller lived in London, working for the War Office building huts, stores and hangars. After the war he returned to civilian developments. Waller invented and patented a new system of buildings, called the "Ctesiphon system", which entailed regularly spaced timber catenary arches that were then wrapped in tightly stretched hessian which was covered in layers of cement with a waterproofing agent. The system avoided the need for shuttering and uncasting necessary for other concrete structures. He used this system during his time with the War Office. He patented the system in 1955. His system was adopted across the world. Later in his working life, Waller became preoccupied with famine, leading him to build factories in Africa, housing in India, Egypt, and Australia, as well as grain storage in Cyprus, and refugee accommodation in Jordan. In the 1940s, he designed a circular hut, possibly designed to be earthquake-proof, known as the Quetta hut. Two engineers in Spain whom Waller met in the 1920s, adopted his techniques, building an airport, farms, and villas to a high standard. The majority of the projects Waller built in Ireland, such as garages and farms, have since been demolished, but one surviving work is his whiskey store at Locke's Distillery, Kilbeggan, County Westmeath. The economy of the Ctesiphon system was met with hostility from building trades, particularly the Plasterers' Union.

His last commission was for Seagram Chivas distillery at Paisley, Scotland, with Seagram buying the patent for the Ctesiphon system. They never used the system again, but paid Waller and later his widow a pension. Waller retired in 1953, to Devon. The Irish Architectural Archive holds an album of his work, presented by his daughter Beatrice Carfrae.
