= Mount Street Club =

Irish charity for the employed

The Mount Street Club was a charity in Ireland for the unemployed of Dublin. It took its name from the location of its premises at 81–82 Lower Mount Street and as an ironic echo of the Kildare Street Club, former bastion of the Protestant Ascendancy.

== History ==
Its premises were at 81–82 Lower Mount Street, allotments beside the railway line at Sydney Parade and Merrion, and a farm in Clondalkin. Men as members could earn "tallies" (paper scrip) which they could exchange for food, clothing, fuel or furniture on a barter or time-banking system. It was founded in 1934 by James Hardress de Warrenne Waller and Philip Somerville-Large. Members produced or obtained food, clothing, and furniture. Lessons in making and repairing works were given, and applied to items donated to the club. The clubhouse had leisure facilities, a kitchen and dining-room for 100, workshops, washing facilities, and a barbershop. When Seanad Éireann was revived under the 1937 Constitution, the Mount Street Club registered as a nominating body on the Administrative Panel. Two of its governors ran in both the April and August 1938 elections, with John Newcome successful in the first, losing his seat once party politics took hold in the Seanad. The club was most successful during The Emergency of the Second World War, when it had 6,000 members. In 1939, the Seanad debated a motion that the Land Commission should donate farmland to the club to alleviate food shortages in the city. The 1942 act establishing the Central Bank of Ireland prohibited "unauthorised money" but made an exception for Mount Street's tallies. By the 1970s its core functions had been superseded by the Department of Social Welfare. In 1972 the club moved from Mount Street to Fenian Street. The work of the Mount Street Club evolved over the years, and in the 1970s and 1980s it supported start-up businesses and set up training schemes for the unemployed. In the 1990s it was involved in regenerating the Grand Canal Dock. The club's property was sold in 2006 and it was incorporated as a charitable trust, the Mount Street Club Trust in 2007. It continues to work on projects that give support to those suffering from the effects of unemployment in the Greater Dublin Area.
