= Quetta hut =

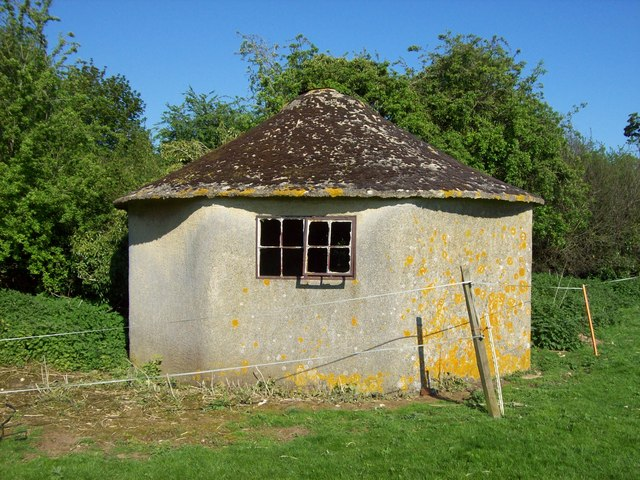
Quetta hut at Monxton in Hampshire

A Quetta hut is a multi-sided concrete building that was designed by the engineer and architect James Hardress de Warrenne Waller. It is believed this type of hut received its name from its use following the 1935 earthquake at Quetta in what is now Pakistan.

== History ==
James H. de W. Waller served as an engineer in the Army in both World Wars. In WWI he was awarded a DSO and OBE and as a Major in WWII designed various huts and buildings for the War Department. He had a particular interest and expertise in the use of concrete especially the use of a sand and cement mix applied to a flexible fibre material in the construction of concrete shells.

== Construction ==
Precast vertical concrete posts were inserted into the ground at each corner; these in turn supported concrete lintels. Hessian material was attached to these concrete supports both inside and out, to which was applied several coats of a cement rendering forming a cavity wall. The roof was constructed of similar materials and supported by temporary scaffolding until the cement mixture had set.

One of the benefits of this construction technique was that it required little timber or metal, both of which were required elsewhere in the war effort. They were also relatively quick to construct compared with a conventional brick building yet were robust buildings, witness their existence and condition after some 80 years, in contrast to the far flimsier wooden huts.

It would appear they were constructed in two sizes, the smaller hut was eight sided with 6 feet long walls while the larger size was 10 sided with 8 feet long walls. They had a covered opening at the apex of the cone shaped roof to allow smoke to escape from the central fire below. The number of doors and windows could be varied depending on local requirements. It is believed they were largely used as accommodation for airfield defence personnel during WWII.

== Examples ==
It is not known how many of these huts were constructed for the military but there are known to presently exist (2021):

- three of the small size at Worthy Down (former HMS Kestrel, RN Fleet Air Arm RAF Worthy Down) are sited around the former dispersal area and are now semi-derelict. One is located in the hedgerow of a field on the eastern side of Christmas Hill, south of Lower Road; the other two are in woodland to the western side of Worthy Grove. Two remain standing but have lost their concrete walls while the third has collapsed and just a few vertical corner posts remain.
- one of the small size at Monxton (former RAF Andover). This hut is complete and located in a field close to the hedge along Red Post Lane and near the junction with Andover Road.
- one of each size at Middle Wallop (former RAF Middle Wallop). These two huts are also complete but are almost entirely obscured by the trees and bushes growing over them. They are located next to one another on the southern perimeter of the bomb store which is itself on the southeastern corner of the present airfield.

A large size hut at Odiham (former RAF Odiham) has been demolished.

All these remaining known sites are in Hampshire which may simply be coincidence.

=== Gallery ===
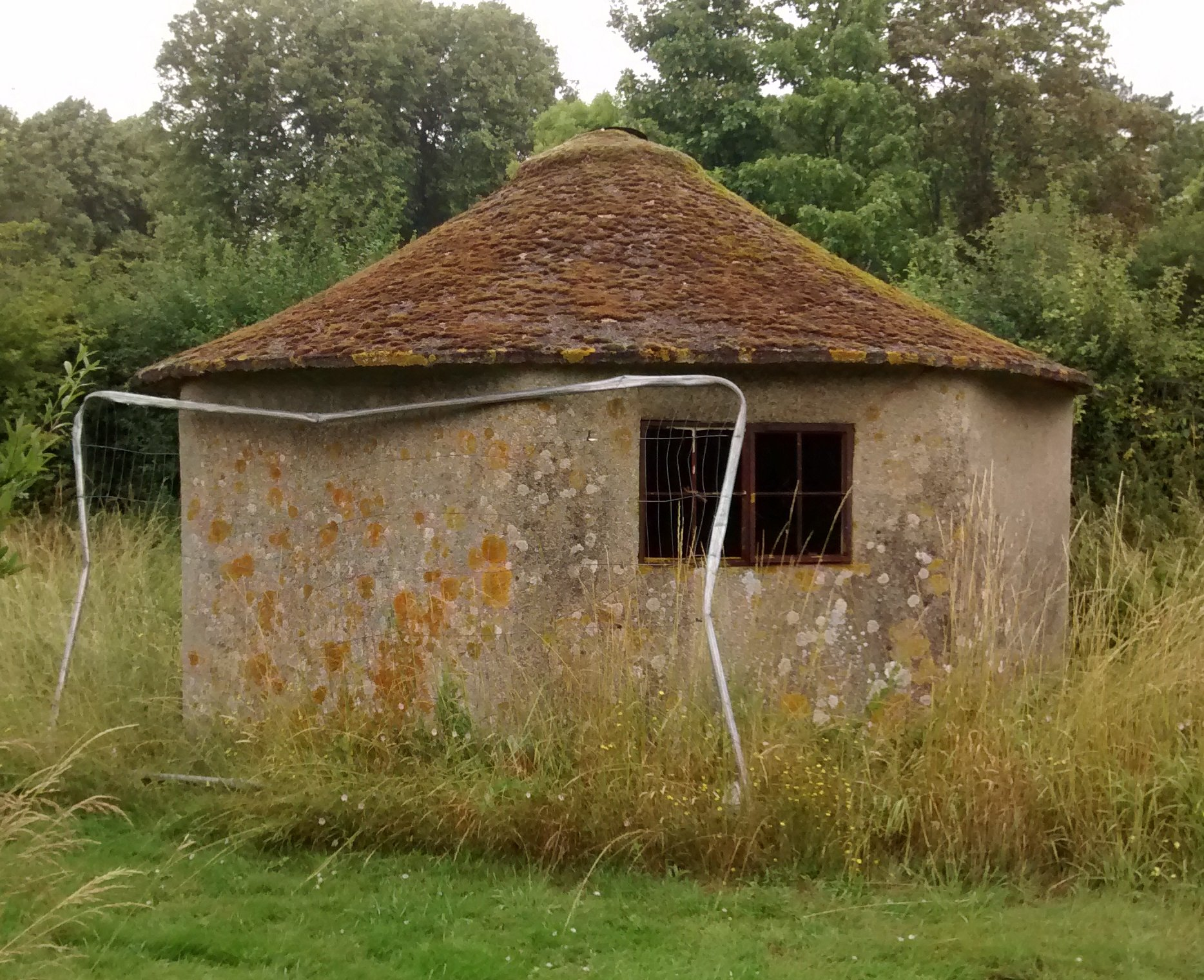
Monxton Quetta Hut

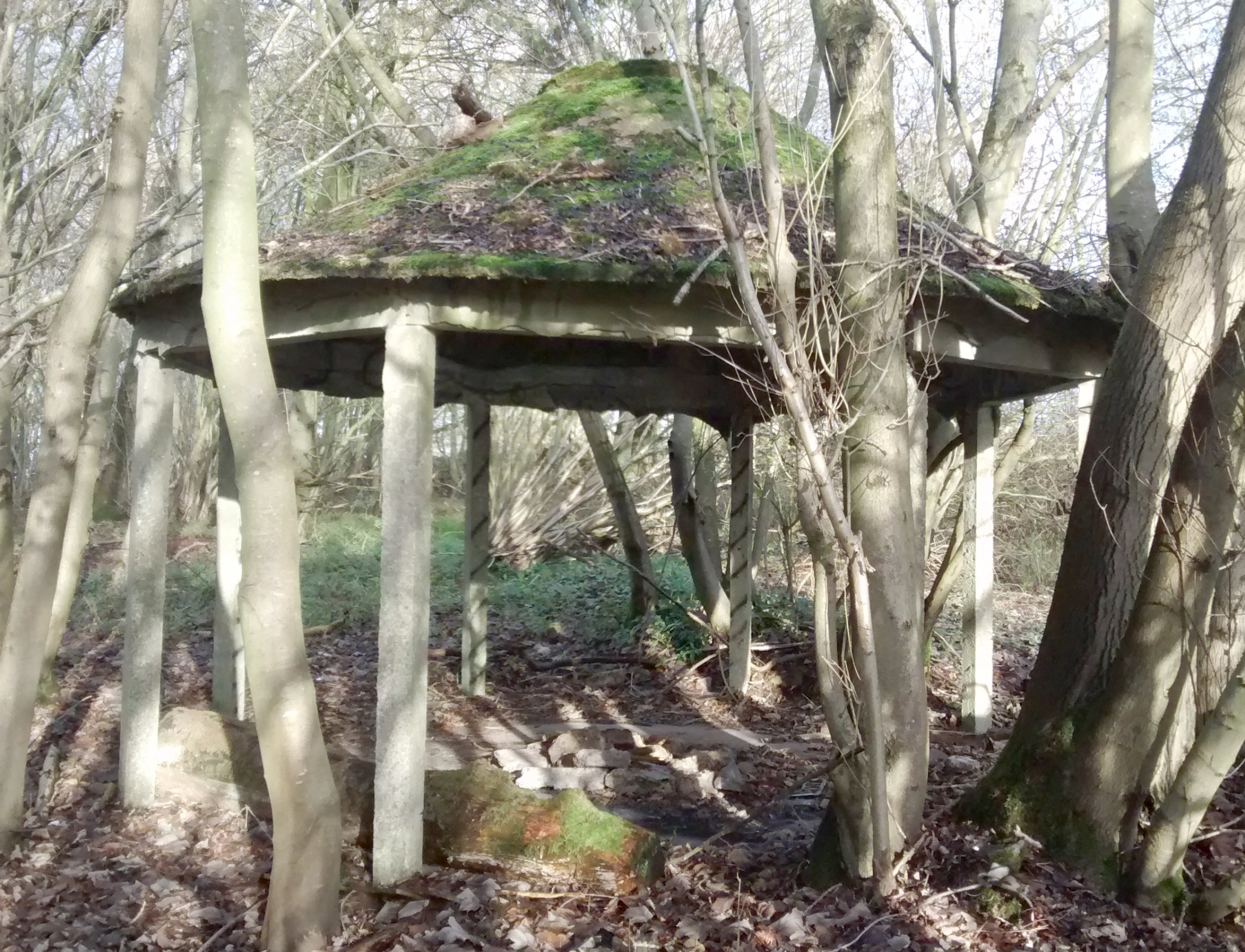
Quetta Hut at Worthy Down (#1)

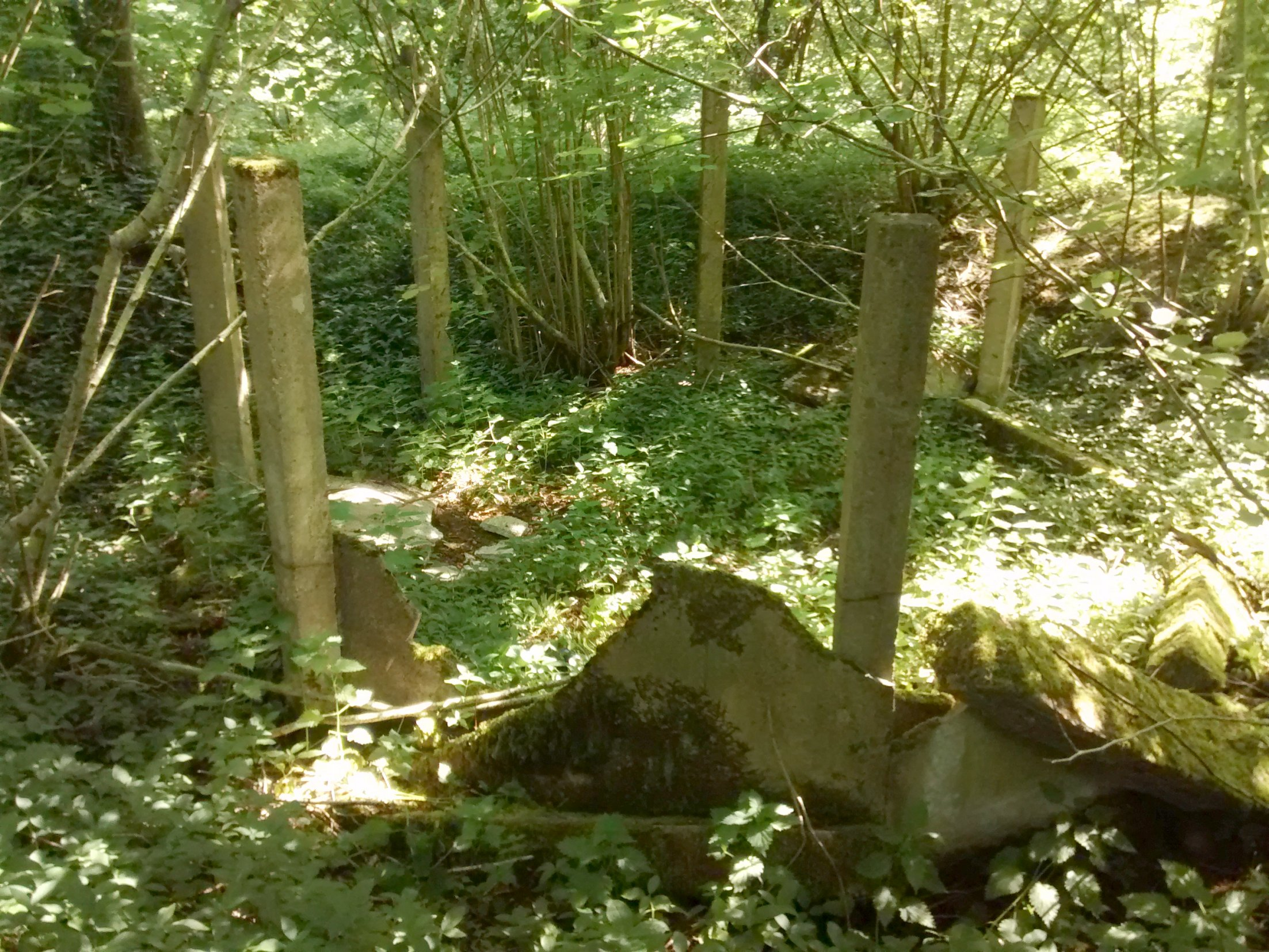
Quetta Hut at Worthy Down (#3)

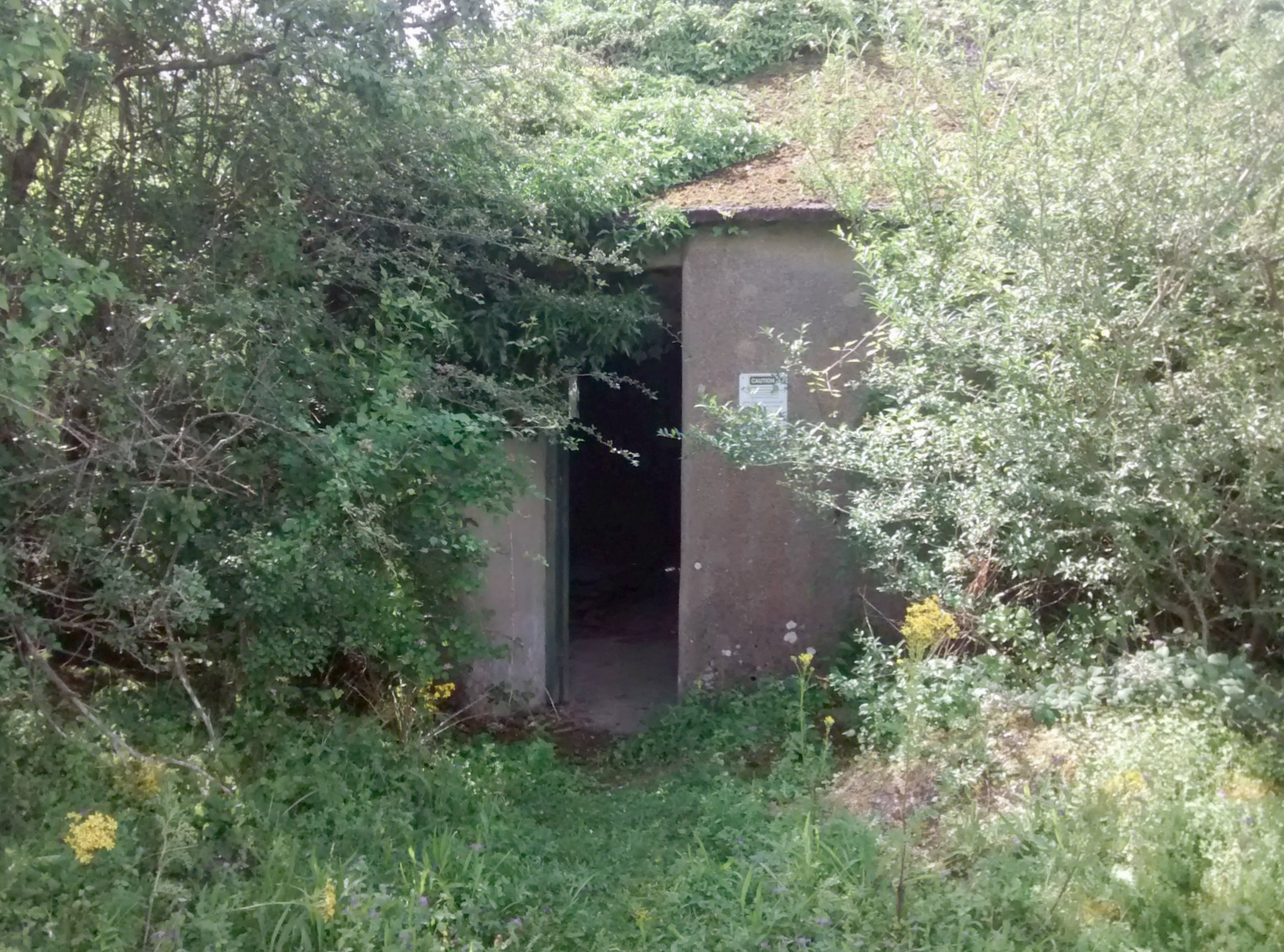
Large Quetta Hut at Middle Wallop

== Bibliography ==
- Francis, Paul (1996). British Military Airfield Architecture. Patrick Stevens Ltd. p. 217. ISBN 185260462X.
- Draper, Karey Lee (2017). Wartime Huts: The Development, Typology and Identification of Temporary Military Buildings in Britain 1914-1945 (PDF) (Thesis). University of Cambridge. p. 216.
- "WALLER, JAMES HARDRESS DE WARENNE". Dictionary of Irish Architects. https://dia.ie/architects/view/5490/waller-jameshardressdewarenne
