= USS Effingham (APA-165) =

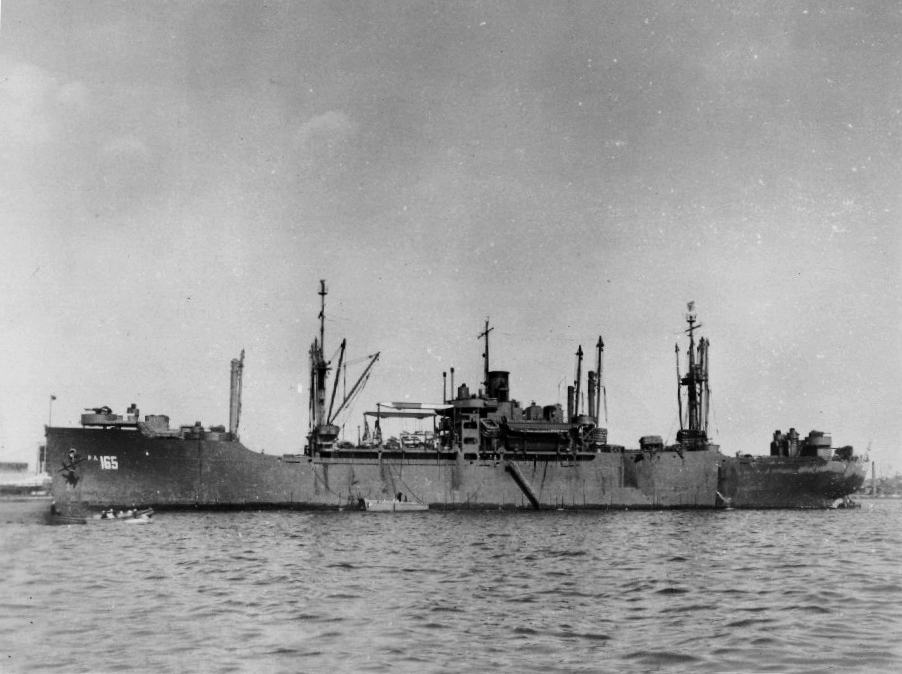

History

United States
- Name: USS Effingham
- Namesake: Effingham County, Georgia; Effingham County, Illinois
- Ordered: as type VC2-S-AP5
- Launched: 29 September 1944
- Acquired: 19 July 1944
- Commissioned: 1 November 1944
- Decommissioned: 17 May 1946
- Fate: Sold for scrapping, 9 April 1973

General characteristics
- Class & type: Haskell-class attack transport
- Displacement: 12,450 tons (full load)
- Length: 455 ft 0 in (138.68 m)
- Beam: 62 ft 0 in (18.90 m)
- Draught: 24 ft 0 in (7.32 m)
- Speed: 19 knots
- Complement: 536
- Armament: one 5 in (130 mm) gun mount, twelve 40 mm gun mounts, ten 20 mm gun mounts

USS Effingham (APA-165) was a Haskell-class attack transport in service with the United States Navy from 1944 to 1946. She was scrapped in 1973.

== History ==
Effingham was launched 29 September 1944 by Oregon Shipbuilding Corp., Portland, Oregon, under a Maritime Commission contract; sponsored by Mrs. J. C. Casada; transferred to the Navy 19 July 1944; and commissioned 1 November 1944.

=== World War II ===
Sailing from San Francisco, California, 2 January 1945, Effingham trained at Guadalcanal with the 1st Marines, then staged at Ulithi for the invasion landings on Okinawa 1 April. For 6 days she remained off the island, unloading her cargo and fighting off enemy air attacks. She returned to San Francisco for overhaul, then arrived back at Okinawa 12 August.

With the end of the war, she transported troops to Jinsen, Korea, and Taku, China, for the reoccupation of those countries. In October and November she embarked Chinese troops at Hong Kong for transfer to Chinwangtao and Qingdao. She returned to the U.S. west coast in December bringing home servicemen, and after a similar voyage to the Far East on "Operation Magic Carpet" duty (which also returned Mochitsura Hashimoto to Japan after he testified at the Charles B. McVay III court-martial), sailed for the U.S. East Coast.

=== Decommissioning and fate ===
She was decommissioned at Norfolk, Virginia, 17 May 1946, and returned to the Maritime Commission for disposal 3 days later. Effingham was sold for scrapping on 9 April 1973 to Union Minerals & Alloys for $111,560.00.

== Awards ==
Effingham received one battle star for World War II service.
