= Get Growing =

- Created by: Top Shelf Productions / Choice TV
- Directed by: Mark Everton
- Presented by: Lynda Hallinan
- Starring: Justin Newcombe
- Country of origin: New Zealand
- No. of series: 2

Production
- Executive producer: Vincent Burke
- Camera setup: Anton Leach
- Running time: 24 minutes

Original release
- Network: ChoiceTV
- Release: 17 October 2014 – 2015

Get Growing is a New Zealand gardening television program. The program focuses on giving gardens complete makeovers. It premiered on Choice TV on 17 October 2014. A second series aired.
