= Susanna Newcome =

English philosopher and theologian

Susanna Newcome (née Squire; 1685–1763) was an English philosopher, theologian, and Christian apologist. She was born in the village of Durnford, Wiltshire, where her father was the vicar. She spent most of her adult life in Cambridge with her husband John Newcome, a professor and university administrator at St John's College, Cambridge. Her most notable work is An Enquiry into the Evidence of the Christian Religion, first published in 1728. In the Enquiry, she offers a Cosmological argument for the existence of God, in particular in defence of the Christian religion. Her life and significance to Christian apologetics has been explored in a biography, No Apologies (2020), by Sarah R. Enterline.

== Supporter of Utilitarianism ==
Her philosophical work can arguably be seen as an early example of Utilitarianism, as defended by Patrick Connolly.
