= Newcomb Place =

Historic house in Massachusetts, United States

- U.S. National Register of Historic Places
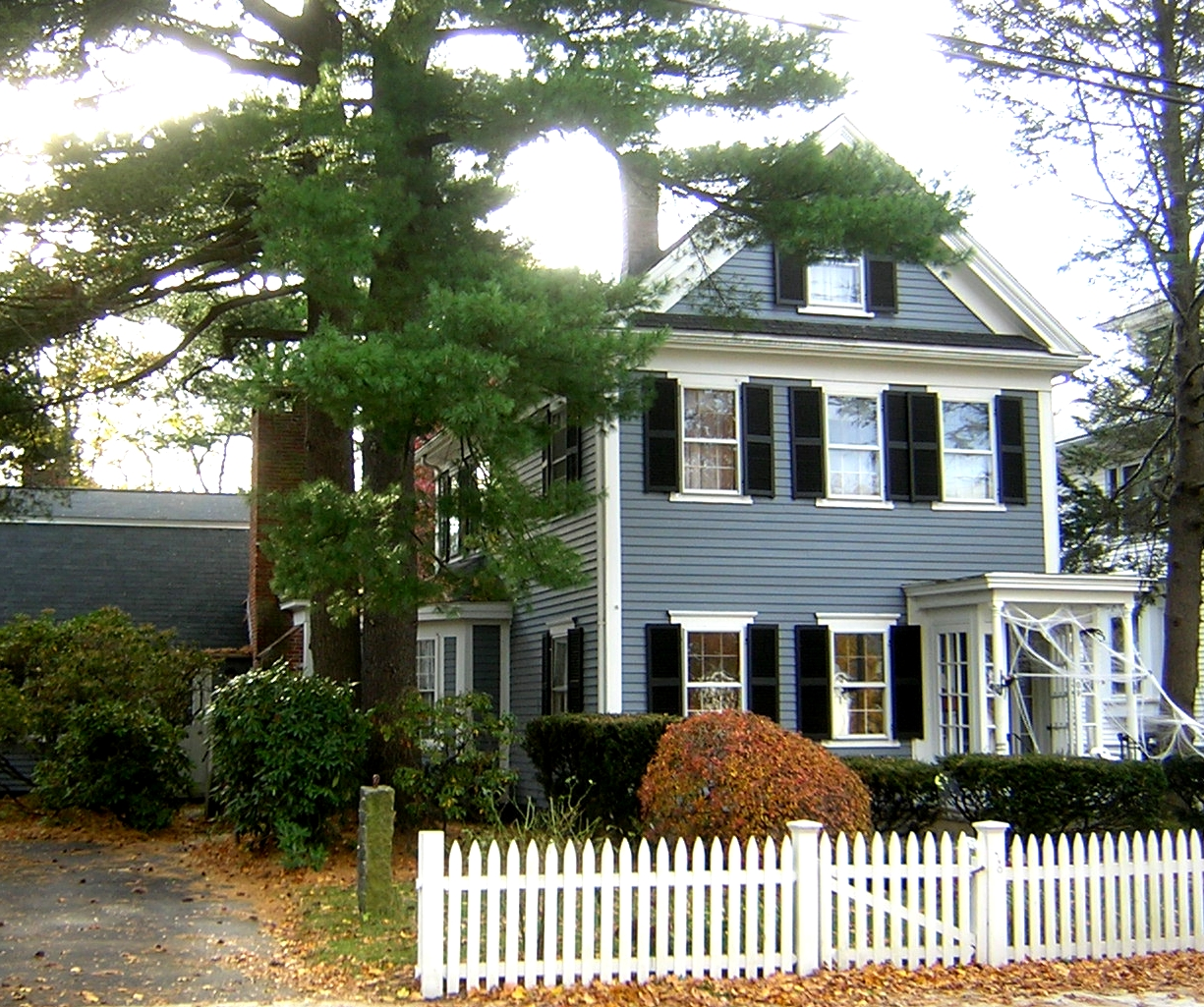

- Location within Massachusetts Location within the United States
- Location: 109 Putnam St., Quincy, Massachusetts
- Coordinates: 42°15′27.28″N 71°0′16.3″W
- Area: 0.3 acres (0.12 ha)
- Built: 1850
- Architectural style: Greek Revival
- MPS: Quincy MRA
- NRHP reference No.: 89001368
- Added to NRHP: September 20, 1989

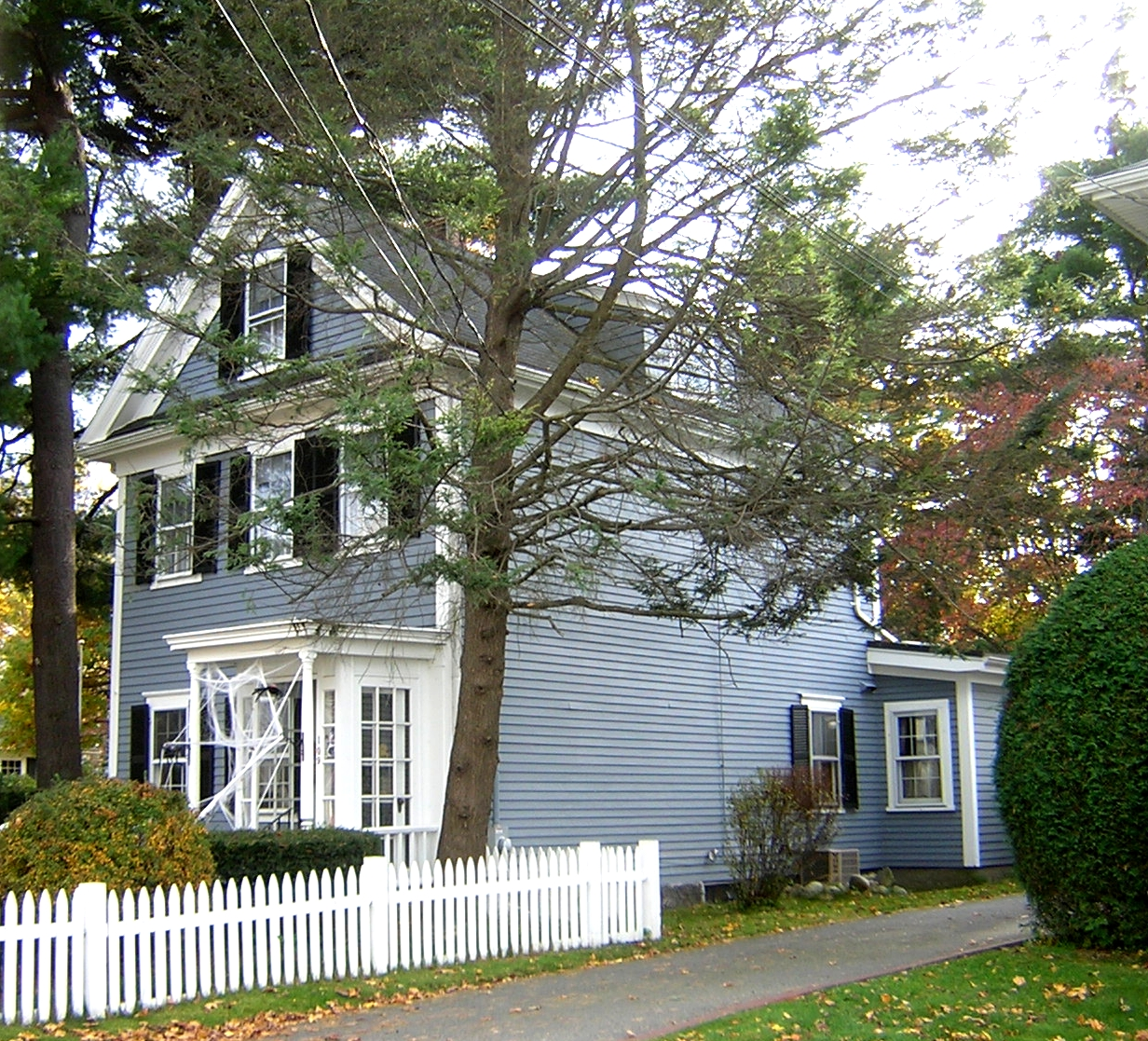

Newcomb Place is a historic house at 109 Putnam Street in Quincy, Massachusetts. The 2 1/2-story wood-frame house was probably built in the 1850s, and is one of the city's finest side-hall Greek Revival houses. It has a three-bay facade with fully pedimented gable, an entablature that wraps around the house, and front windows with simple projecting lintels. The house was owned in the second half of the 19th century by Joseph Newcomb, a painter.

The house was listed on the National Register of Historic Places in 1989.

== See also ==
- National Register of Historic Places listings in Quincy, Massachusetts
