= Cyrenius A. Newcomb Sr. =

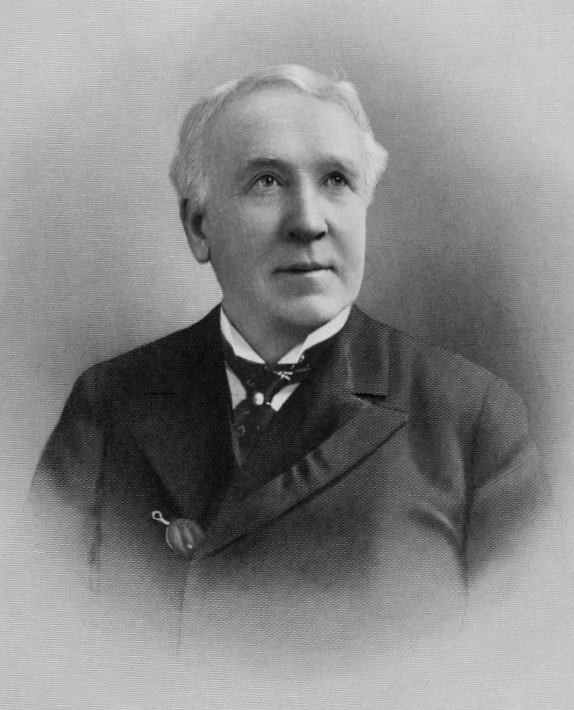
- Born: November 10, 1837; Cortland, New York
- Died: March 9, 1915 (aged 77); Detroit, Michigan
- Occupation: Merchant
- Spouses: Mary Haskell (m. 1867; died 1887) Mary Sharp (m. 1899)
- Children: 4

Cyrenius Adelbert Newcomb Sr. (1837–1915) co-founded Michigan's first department store, Newcomb-Endicott, which became one of the largest mercantile firms in the Midwest prior to World War I. He was also a leader in reform and philanthropic work. He was also a member of the Detroit Athletic Club and one of the donors who created the Detroit Institute of Arts (originally known as the Detroit Museum of Art).

== New England roots ==
Cyrenius Newcomb Sr. was born to Hezekiah and Nancy (Rounds) Newcomb in Cortland, New York, November 10, 1837. His family can be traced to the Newcombs who were actively involved in the American Revolution. He was educated at Bridgewater Normal School (Massachusetts).

He married Mary Haskell in Hartford, Connecticut on November 12, 1867. The couple had four children: Dr. William Wilmon Newcomb, Cyrenius A. Newcomb Jr., Mary Newcomb (who later married William E. Fuller Jr. and lived in Fall River, Massachusetts), and Howard Rounds Newcomb. After Mary (Haskell) Newcomb died on November 17, 1887, he married Mary Sharp in Detroit on September 20, 1899.

== Early business career ==
Newcomb Sr. began working at age 18 at a dry goods business in Hannibal, New York. Two years later he was employed as a clerk at N.H. Skinner of Taunton, Massachusetts, another dry goods store. Nine years later, he became a partner in the business.

In 1868, Newcomb Sr. sold his interest in N.H. Skinner and moved to Detroit, establishing a dry goods store on the corner of Jefferson and Woodward avenues, near today's Hart Plaza. Three years later, the store moved to the first floor of the original Detroit Opera House Building. By 1881, the store moved again to a location on Woodward Avenue which the J.L. Hudson's Department Store later occupied.

In the mid-1880s, Newcomb Sr. was one of the donors who gave money to establish a permanent arts museum, now called the Detroit Institute of Arts.

== Partnership with John Endicott ==
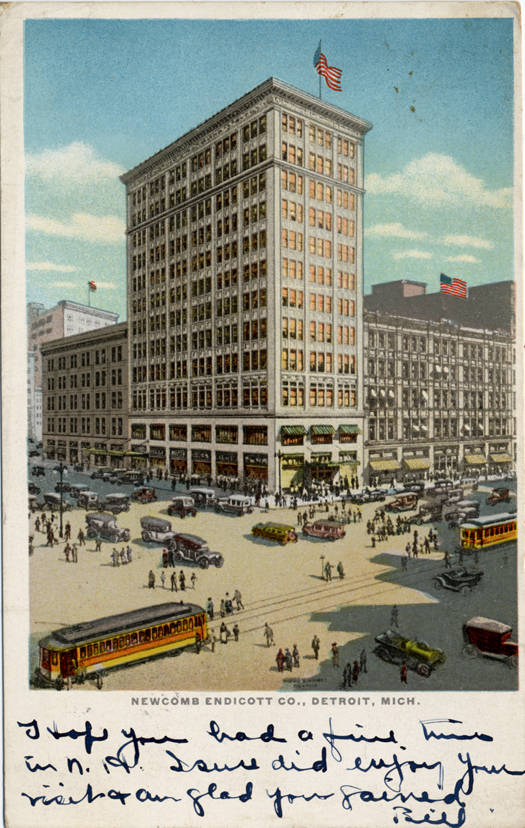
Newcomb-Endicott, circa 1910s

Massachusetts native and Harvard graduate John Endicott came to Detroit in 1891, becoming head bookkeeper of Newcomb's enterprise. He was "admitted as a member of the firm" in 1896 and became treasurer when Newcomb-Endicott was incorporated as a department store in 1903. He was married twice, first to Elizabeth Watson, who died, and then in 1902 to Mary Elizabeth Booth and had three children. His other endeavors included being director of the Michigan State Agricultural Society, and owner of a large stock farm near Birmingham where he bred Hackney horses. Newcomb-Endicott Co. was Michigan's first department store, founded in 1868, predating the J.L. Hudson Co., Crowley-Milner Co., or the Ernst Kern Co.

== Detroit Athletic Club connection ==
When the Detroit Athletic Club (DAC) was reorganized in the early 1910s, merging with the Wolverine Automotive Club and the remnant of the nearly defunct original organization, Newcomb-Endicott was picked as the contractor to provide much of the original interior furnishings.

The front section of the April 17, 1915 edition of Detroit Saturday Night was devoted almost exclusively to how the DAC was built.

The store was given an "honorable mention" in the Detroit Saturday Night paper, which described how it provided "carpets and rugs of handsome design and exquisite workmanship." Newcomb-Endicott had been chosen among Detroit's other department stores because its "ability to handle big orders of this kind has been demonstrated often before in the equipping and furnishing of other public buildings," the paper continued.

== Other activities ==
Newcomb Sr. was president of Newcomb-Endicott up until the time of his death in late 1915, but had abandoned an active role in the business due to failing health. also enjoyed automobiling. He was a Republican and a Universalist. Known for his philanthropic work, he was a member of the board of several charities and was active in politics although he never ran for elected office. Cyrenius Newcomb Sr. died at his home in Detroit on March 9, 1915.
