= Michael Newcomb =

Michael Newcomb may refer to:

- Michael D. Newcomb (1952–2010), American psychologist
- Michael E. Newcomb, American clinical psychologist
