= Newcomb House (Pasadena, California) =

Historic house in California, United States

- U.S. National Register of Historic Places
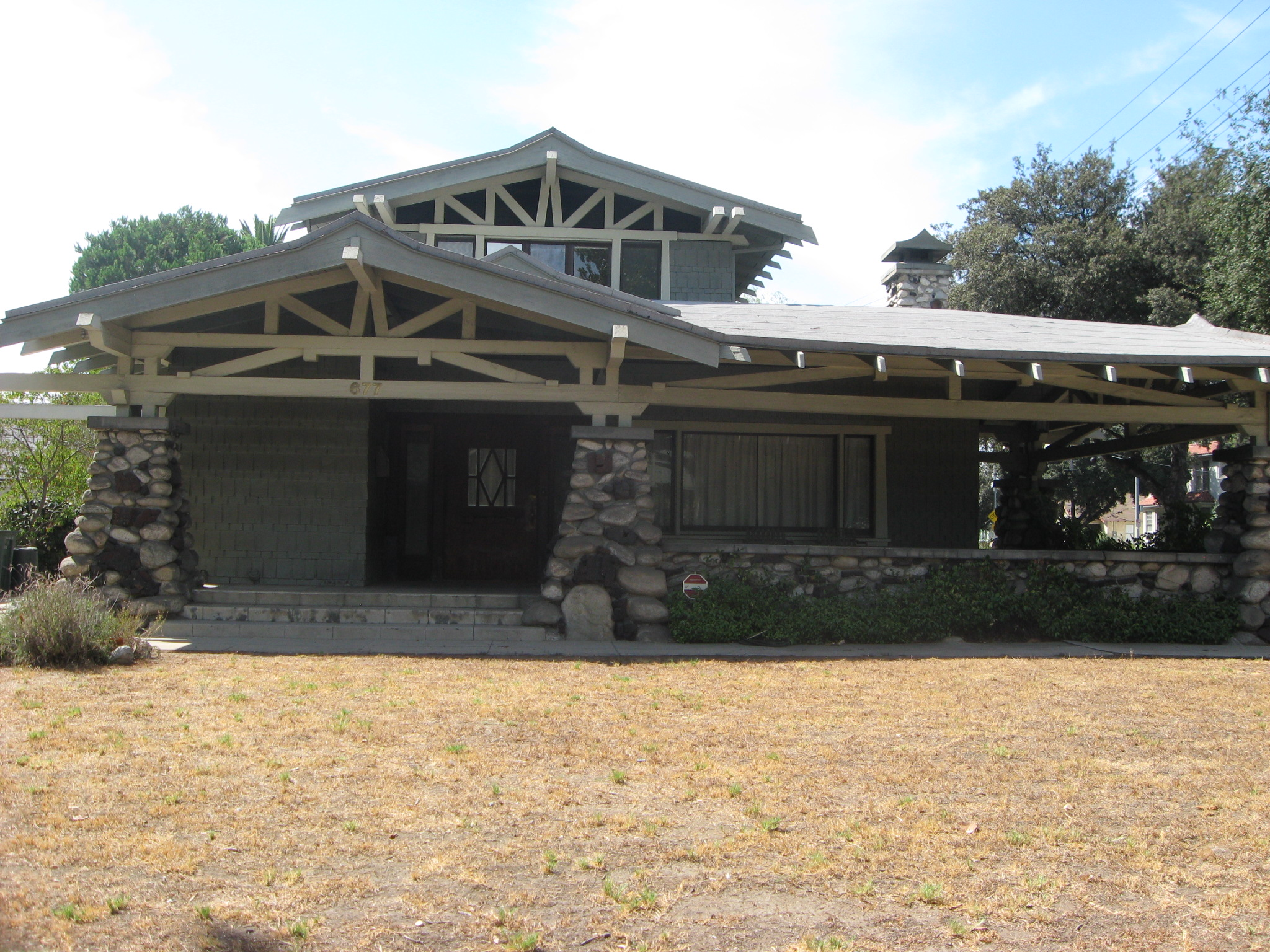

- Location within the Los Angeles metropolitan area Location within California Location within the United States
- Location: 675--677 N. El Molino Ave., Pasadena, California
- Coordinates: 34°9′27″N 118°8′10″W
- Area: 0.3 acres (0.12 ha)
- Built: 1914
- Built by: Williams, Bert
- Architectural style: Airplane Bungalow
- NRHP reference No.: 82002198
- Added to NRHP: September 2, 1982

The Newcomb House is a historic bungalow located at 675-677 N. El Molino Ave. in Pasadena, California, United States. The house was built in 1914 for Dr. R. H. Newcomb. The house is an example of an airplane bungalow, an uncommon style of bungalow named for its resemblance to a biplane. The broad first-floor roof is designed to resemble a wing when viewed from the small second floor, and the strut and fretwork on the porch gable is similar to that of an airplane. The American Craftsman style was also used in the house's detailed woodwork. The house is one of the later houses built in its neighborhood, an area containing many bungalow designs, and is therefore part of a historic local progression of bungalow designs.

The house was added to the National Register of Historic Places on September 2, 1982.
