= Justin Newcombe =

New Zealand freelance writer, garden designer, and landscaper

- Occupations: Broadcaster, Interior designer and builder

Justin Newcombe, is a New Zealand freelance writer, garden designer, and landscaper. He has appeared in several NZ Gardening shows and has released his own Gardening book 'The Kiwi Back Yard Handbook'.

== Television ==
- Hearts
- Get Growing
- Full Frontage
- The Get Growing Roadshow

== Books ==
- The Kiwi Back Yard Handbook
