= Newcomen =

Newcomen may refer to:

== People ==
- John Newcomen (c.1613–1630), English first white settler murdered by another white settler in Plymouth Colony, Massachusetts
- Matthew Newcomen (c. 1610–1669), English nonconformist churchman
- Thomas Newcomen (1663–1729), English ironmonger and inventor

== Other uses ==
- Viscount Newcomen, of Mosstown in the County of Longford, a title in the Peerage of Ireland
- Newcomen baronets, of Kenagh in the County of Longford, a title in the Baronetage of Ireland
- Newcomen Society, a British learned society
- Newcomen Society of the United States, an educational foundation
- Newcomen atmospheric engine, a device to harness the power of steam to produce mechanical work
