= Frederick Clive Newcome =

English painter

Frederick Clive Newcome (1847–1894), was an English Landscape painter, chiefly in watercolours.

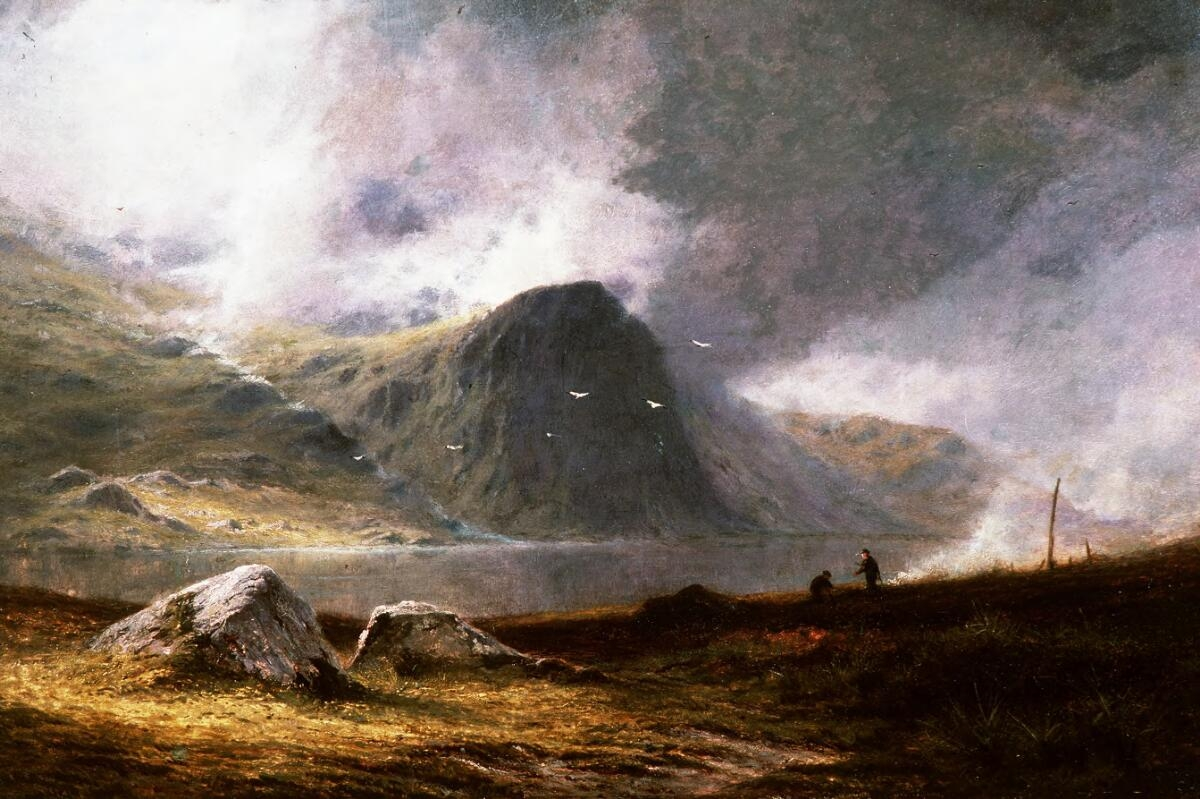
Peat burners near Snowdon - an oil painting by Newcome at the National Library of Wales

== Life and work ==
Frederick Clive Newcome was christened Frederick Harrison Suker but adopted Newcome to distinguish him from his brother Arthur Suker and father John Suker who were also painters. He studied at the Mount Street School of Art under John Finnie.

Frederick received his fair share of recognition during his lifetime, the famous art critic and Pre-Raphaelite Brotherhood champion John Ruskin applauded Newcome's painting The Head of a Highland Glen exhibited at the Royal Academy in 1875, exclaiming 'the best study of torrent, including distant and near water, that I find in the rooms' before adding 'the rest of this mountain scene by Mr. Newcome is also carefully studied, and very right and good.'

Newcome's earliest sketching-ground was at Bettws-y-Coed in Wales, and he afterwards worked in Scotland, Warwickshire, Devonshire and the Lake District. The last was his favourite, and in 1880 he made Keswick, Cumbria his headquarters, before moving to Coniston, Lancashire where he died in 1894.

== Exhibitions ==
He exhibited prolifically at all the major exhibitions including:

- The Royal Society of Artists, Birmingham
- Manchester City Art Gallery
- The Royal Academy, London
- The Royal Scottish Academy
