= John Newcome (politician) =

Irish politician (died 1938)

Senator
- In office 27 April 1938 – 7 September 1938
- Constituency: Administrative Panel

Personal details
- Died: 1938
- Political party: Independent

John Joseph Newcome (died 1938) was an independent Irish politician. He was a member of Seanad Éireann from April to August 1938. He was elected to the 2nd Seanad in April 1938 by the Administrative Panel. He lost his seat at the August 1938 Seanad election. He was a governor of the Mount Street Club, a charity that helped the unemployed.
