= Richard Newcomb =

American historian

Richard Fairchild Newcomb (June 6, 1913 – December 3, 2004) was a wartime naval correspondent during World War II and received a Purple Heart. He was a news editor of the Associated Press and the author of a number of books on the battles in the Pacific during the Second World War, including Abandon Ship!, Savo, in particular Iwo Jima, an account of the Battle of Iwo Jima.

Newcomb was from Haworth, New Jersey. He graduated from the School of Journalism, Rutgers College in 1932. His two books Abandon Ship! (1958) and Iwo Jima (1965) were bestsellers. Abandon Ship! is the first book written on the sinking of USS Indianapolis, while Iwo Jima is an oral history of the veterans involved in the assault on Iwo Jima. He retired to Palm Coast, Florida in 1984, and died on December 3, 2004.

== Works ==
- Newcomb, Richard F. Abandon ship!. Holt, NY 1958, republished by HarperCollins Publishers, 2000. ISBN 0-06-018471-X
- Newcomb, Richard F. The battle of Savo Island 1st Owl books ed. New York : H. Holt, 2002. ISBN 0-8050-7072-9
- Newcomb, Richard F. Iwo Jima, foreword by Harry Schmidt. Holt, Rinehart and Winston, 1965. Republished 2002 ISBN 0-8050-7071-0
- Newcomb, Richard F. A pictorial history of the Vietnam War maps by Rafael Palacios. Garden City, N.Y. : Doubleday, 1987. ISBN 0-385-18540-5
- Newcomb, Richard F. Savo: the incredible naval debacle off Guadalcanal. [1st ed.] New York, Holt, Rinehart and Winston, 1961.
- Newcomb, Richard F. U.S. destroyers of the world wars. Paducah, Ky. : Turner Pub. Co., 1994. ISBN 1-56311-134-9
