= John Newcome (academic) =

English priest (1684–1765)

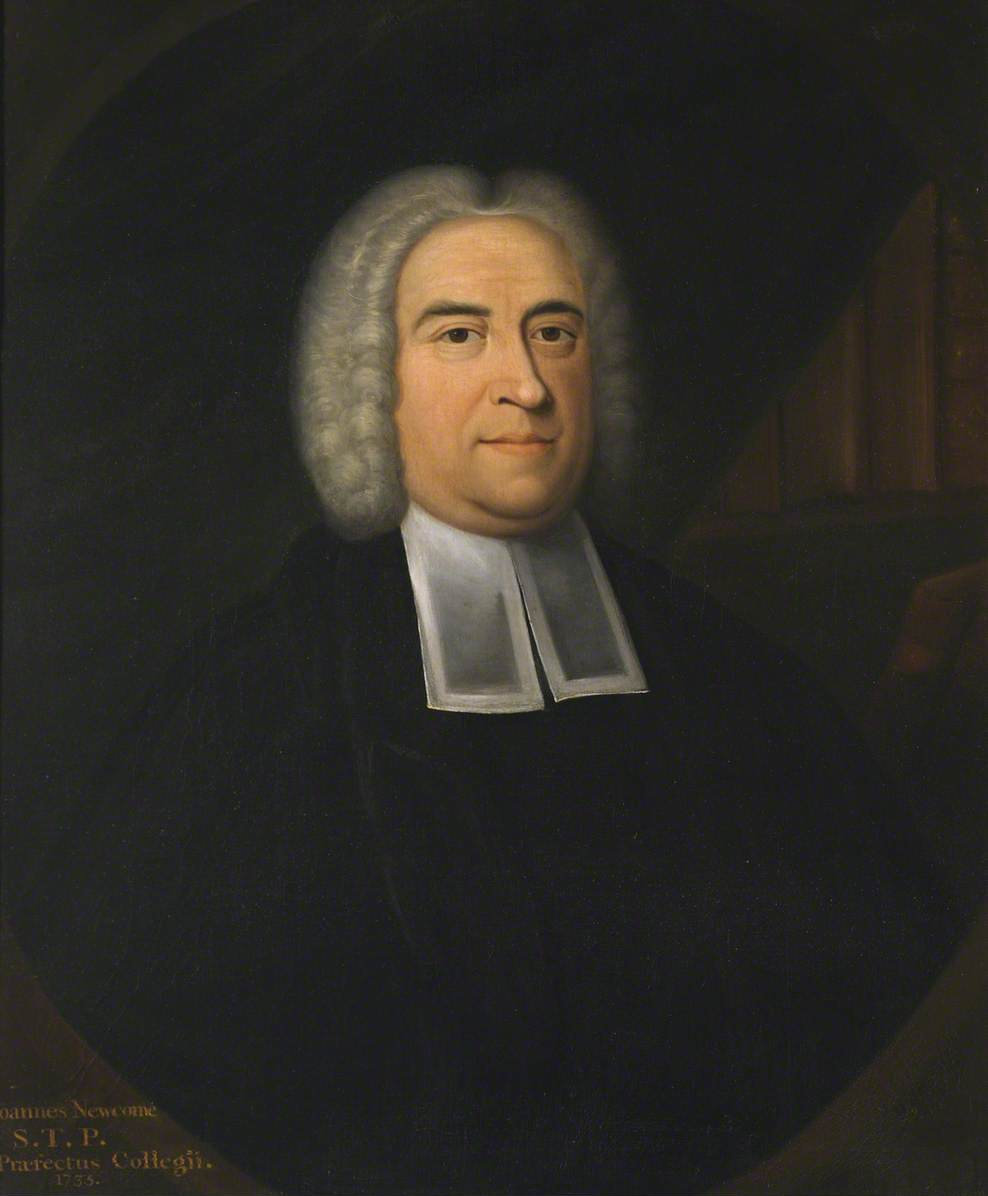
John Newcome

John Newcome (10 September 1684 – 10 January 1765) was an English academic and priest, who served as Master of St John's College, Cambridge.

Newcome was born in Grantham, Lincolnshire, England and educated at The King's School, Grantham. He was admitted to St John's College, Cambridge in 1700, aged 16, and graduated B.A. 1705, M.A. 1708, B.D. 1715, D.D. 1725. He was a Fellow of St John's from 1707 to 1728.

He was appointed Lady Margaret's Professor of Divinity in 1727, Master of St John's in 1735, and Dean of Rochester in 1744, holding all three positions until his death. He died at St John's on 10 January 1765.

Newcome's wife, Susanna Newcome, was an English philosopher and theologian.
