= Andrew Doria (1775 brig) =

Ship of the Continental Navy

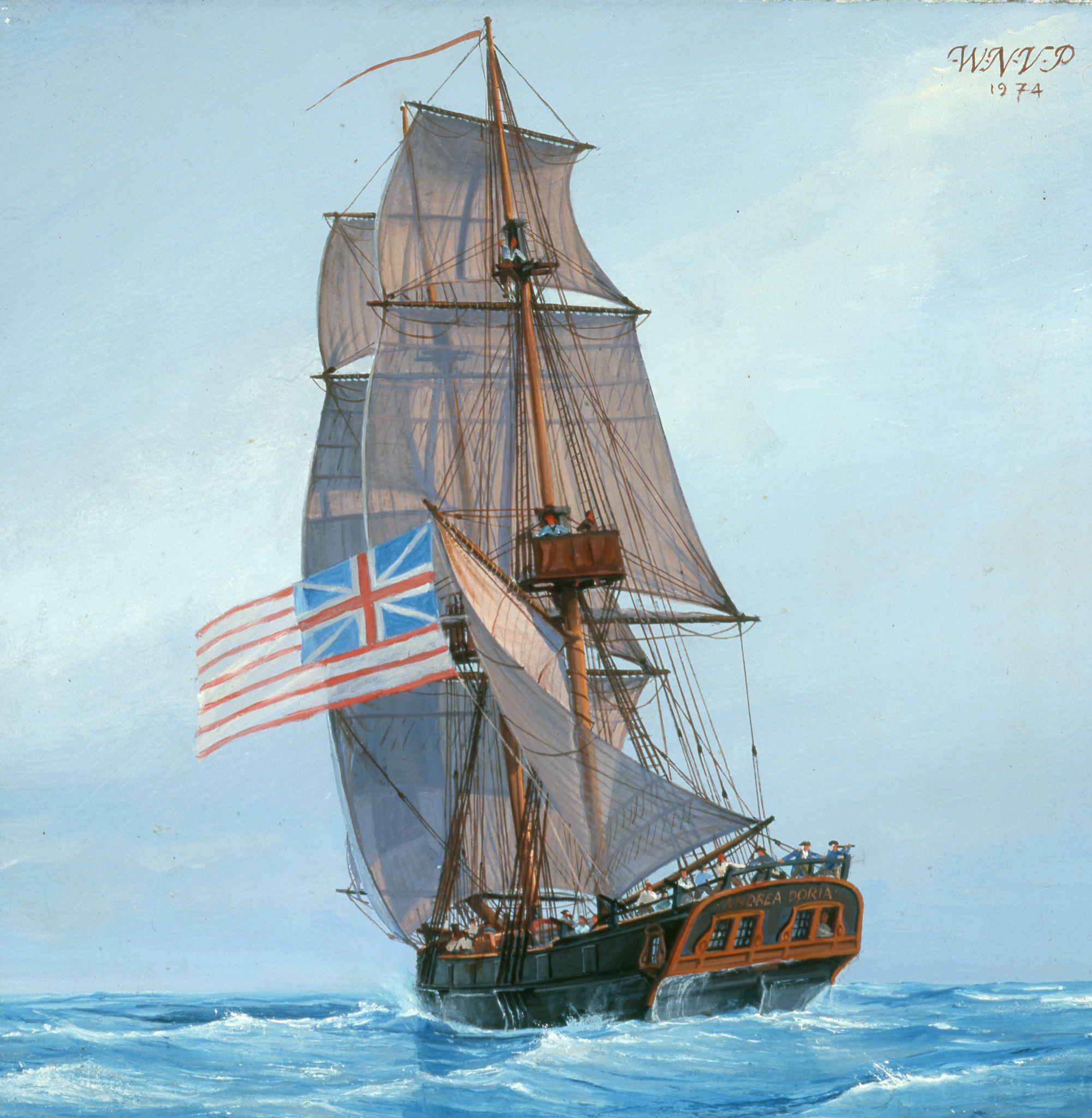
- 1974 painting of Andrew Doria by William Nowland Van Powell

History

United States
- Name: Andrew Doria
- Namesake: Andrea Doria
- Acquired: November 1775
- Nickname(s): "Black Brig"
- Fate: Scuttled in the Delaware River, November 1777
- Notes: Formerly merchant brig Defiance

General characteristics
- Type: Brig
- Displacement: 190 long tons (190 t)
- Length: 75 ft (23 m)
- Beam: 25 ft (7.6 m)
- Depth: 10 ft (3.0 m)
- Complement: 112 officers and men
- Armament: 14 × 4-pounder (1.8 kg) guns

Service record
- Commanders: Capt. Nicholas Biddle; Capt. Isaiah Robinson
- Operations: Battle of Nassau; Battle of Block Island

USS Andrew Doria was a 14-gun brig of the Continental Navy. Purchased by the Continental Congress in November 1775, she is most famous for her participation in the Battle of Nassau—the first amphibious engagement by the Continental Navy and the Continental Marines—and for being the first United States vessel to receive a salute from a foreign power.

== Purchase ==
On 13 October 1775, the Continental Congress authorized the purchase of the merchant brig Defiance. The ship was acquired in mid-November and moored in Wharton and Humphreys shipyard in Philadelphia where she was converted into a warship by Joshua Humphreys (hull strengthening), John Barry (re-rigging), and John Falconer (ordnance and provisioning) at a cost of £296.4s.6d. She was named Andrew Doria after the 16th-century Genoese admiral Andrea Doria. Under the command of Captain Nicholas Biddle, Andrew Doria departed Philadelphia on 4 January 1776, as a warship in Esek Hopkins' small fleet of five newly fitted warships (Alfred, Andrew Doria, Cabot, Columbus, and Providence), bound for the Chesapeake Bay. Between 11 and 17 February, the fleet was joined by the small sloop Fly, the sloop Hornet, and the schooner Wasp.

== Battle of Nassau ==
On 17 February 1776, Hopkins decided to take advantage of the discretion offered him and skip his missions in the Chesapeake Bay and along the coasts of the Carolinas. Instead, he took the fleet to the Bahamas for a raid on the island of New Providence to seize a large supply of gunpowder reportedly stored in the two forts that protected Nassau. On 1 March, the fleet reached the coast of Abaco Island where the ship Alfred captured two small sloops and Hopkins obtained intelligence from the prisoners that New Providence lay undefended. Hopkins planned to take Nassau by frontal assault, slipping his landing party of 270 sailors and marines into the harbor hidden on board the captured sloops. It was hoped that the American troops would not be detected until the landing and assault on Fort Nassau began. Success in this endeavor would enable the fleet to enter the harbor while the fort's guns, then in American hands, held the town at bay.

The marines and sailors embarked on the two captured sloops on the evening of 2 March and headed for New Providence, hoping to arrive at daybreak. While following the sloops, the fleet attempted to remain out of sight until the landing party had secured the fort. Andrew Doria—popularly referred to as the "Black Brig"—outdistanced her consorts and found it necessary to lay-to until the other American warships caught up. As the troop-carrying sloops headed into the harbor, Fort Nassau's guns opened fire. The shot fell short but demonstrated that the American fleet had been detected and that its intentions had been surmised. Hopkins recalled his ships.

After conferring with his officers, Hopkins decided to land his troops two miles (3 km) down the coast from Fort Montagu, which protected the eastern approaches to Nassau. The marines and sailors went ashore on 3 March and marched to Fort Montagu whose garrison surrendered without offering any real resistance. On 4 March, the Americans took Fort Nassau and town of Nassau. The fleet remained for almost two weeks, dismantling the guns of the forts and loading the captured materiel. During this stay, large numbers of the crew of each ship were stricken by a virulent fever. This complicated an already serious health problem caused by an outbreak of smallpox on all of the ships except for Andrew Doria whose crew had been protected by inoculation due to the far-sighted insistence of Nicholas Biddle. As a result of the crew's immunization, Andrew Doria was selected to serve as a hospital ship for the fleet and continued in this role for the remainder of the expedition. On 16 March, Hopkin's fleet departed Nassau and headed north.

== Battle of Block Island ==
Shortly after midnight on 6 April 1776, a lookout on Andrew Doria sighted two vessels to the southeast. Biddle passed word of the discovery to Hopkins who ordered the fleet to head for the strangers. The larger of the unidentified ships headed toward the Americans and before long she was within hailing distance and identified herself as "... His Majesty's ship of war Glasgow...." A broadside from Cabot into the British frigate opened a fierce fight in which the American ships were unable to fight as a squadron. In attempting to avoid a salvo from Glasgow, Cabot crossed Andrew Doria's bow, forcing Biddle's brig onto a port tack which avoided collision but took her away from the action. Meanwhile, Alfred and Columbus, Hopkins' largest warships, took on Glasgow but received worse punishment than they inflicted. Howe reported HMS Glasgow was "much damaged" in the attack by the Alfred and Columbus during the exchange of broadsides, with one killed and three wounded.

As the crew of Andrew Doria worked the ship into position to reenter the engagement and opened fire, Glasgow's captain, Captain Tyringham Howe realized he was overmatched and decided to stand off to the northward. Andrew Doria, followed at a distance by her consorts, gave chase and kept up a running fight with her bow chasers until recalled by Hopkins, lest Glasgow lead his fleet to a Royal Navy squadron then operating in Rhode Island waters. When the American fleet had reformed, it retired to New London, Connecticut, where it arrived on the morning of 8 April.

== Change of command ==
From 9 April to 17 September 1776, Andrew Doria patrolled the Atlantic coast from Connecticut to Bermuda, capturing a number of British and Loyalist ships. On 11 July she captured ship "Nathaniel & Elizabeth". Capt. Biddle anchored his brig at Chester, Pennsylvania, on the evening of 17 September, ending his last cruise on the warship, as he had been selected to command Randolph, one of the four new frigates being built at Philadelphia for the Continental Navy. Capt. Isaiah Robinson took command of Andrew Doria.

== First salute ==
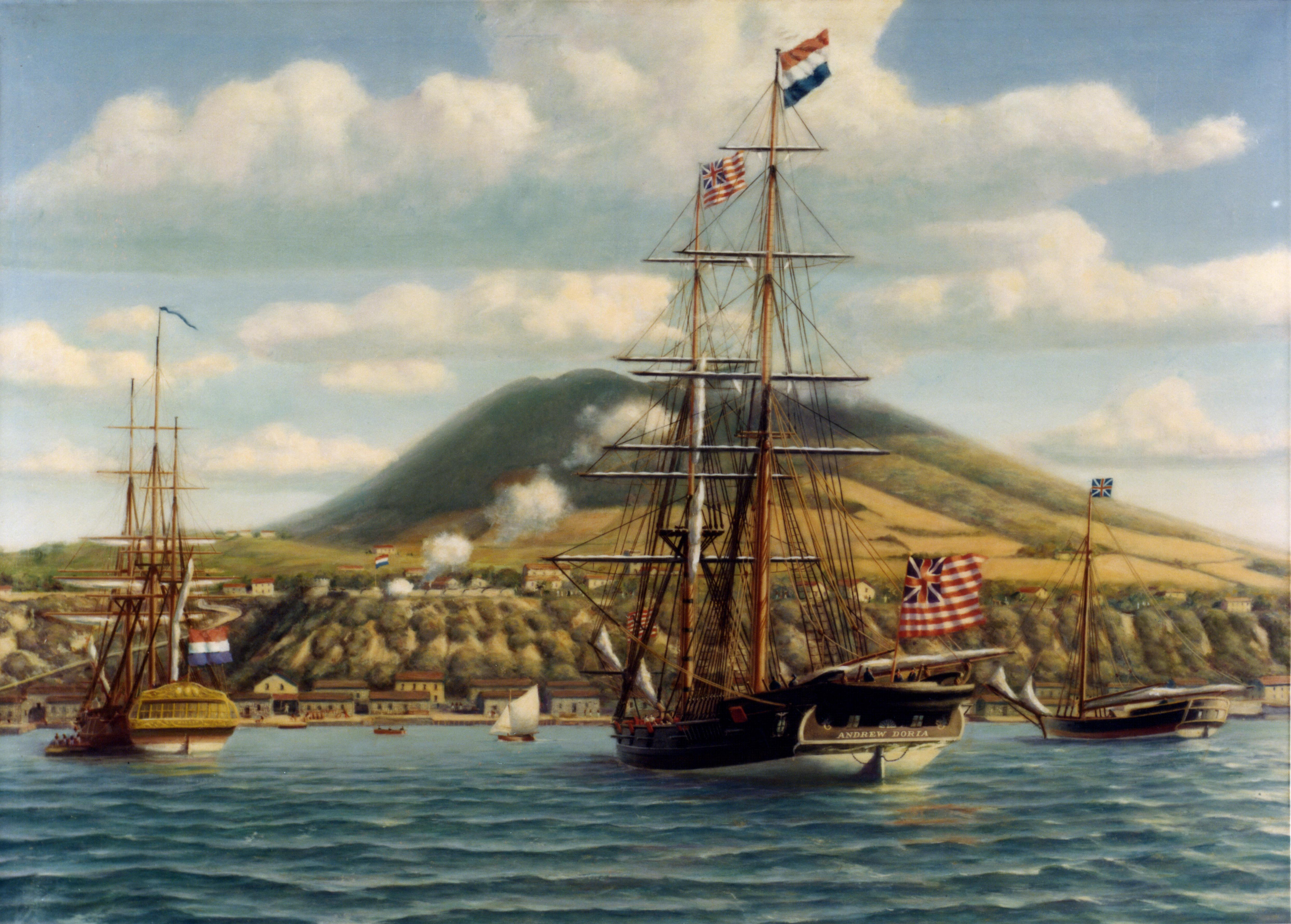
Andrew Doria receiving "The First Salute" from the Dutch fort at Sint Eustatius on November 16, 1776

Robinson sailed Andrew Doria down the Delaware River on 17 October 1776, for a voyage to the West Indies to obtain a cargo of munitions and military supplies at the Dutch island of Sint Eustatius. When the brig reached the island on 16 November, she fired a 13-gun salute and received a reply from Fort Oranje—the first salute to an American flag on board an American warship in a foreign port. Andrew Doria also carried a copy of the Declaration of Independence to the island. The so-called "first salute" was widely reported in the United States at the time, and later provided the title for Barbara Tuchman's 1988 book, The First Salute: A View of the American Revolution.

On her way back to the Delaware River, Andrew Doria encountered the sloop HMS Racehorse, of 10 guns, and under the command of Commander James Jones. A two-hour single-ship action ensued before Racehorse struck. Andrew Doria had lost four men killed and eight wounded; casualties on Racehorse apparently were higher. Andrew Doria encountered a British snow and assigned Joshua Barney to return the ship to Philadelphia, but was captured with a fouled rudder off Chincoteage by HMS Perseus. The captain released Barney on pardon in Charleston to return to Philadelphia on foot over 19 days. Andrew Doria returned to Philadelphia where the Continental Navy acquired Racehorse, which it renamed Surprise.

== Scuttling ==
Andrew Doria was stationed in the Delaware River through the spring and summer of 1777. After Vice Admiral Lord Howe brought his British fleet into the river in September 1777, Andrew Doria was part of the forces charged with defending Philadelphia. Following the British occupation of Fort Mifflin on 16 November, Andrew Doria, with the remaining ships of the Continental Navy, sought shelter under the guns of Fort Mercer, at Red Bank, Gloucester County, New Jersey. With the evacuation of Fort Mercer on 20 November, Robinson gave orders the next day for the ships to be burned to prevent capture. This was done shortly thereafter.
