= Battle of Block Island =

1776 battle of the American Revolutionary War

- Part of the American Revolutionary War
- 1779 map of Block Island
Date	April 6, 1776
Location	Off Block Island, Outer Lands 40.90°N 71.25°W
Result	British victory

Belligerents
Great Britain	United Colonies

Commanders and leaders
Tyringham Howe	Esek Hopkins

Strength
1 post ship	2 frigates; 2 brigs; 2 sloops; 1 schooner

Casualties and losses
1 killed; 3 wounded	10 killed; 14 wounded

The Battle of Block Island was a naval skirmish which took place in the waters off Rhode Island during the American Revolutionary War. A Continental Navy squadron under the command of Commodore Esek Hopkins was returning from a successful raid on Nassau when it encountered HMS Glasgow, post ship of the Royal Navy under Captain Tyringham Howe.

Glasgow escaped from the American squadron, although it sustained significant damage, and the battle is considered a victory for the British. Several captains of the Continental squadron were criticized for their actions during the battle, and one was dismissed as a result. Hopkins was criticized for other actions pertaining to the cruise, including the distribution of seized goods, and was also dismissed.

== Background ==
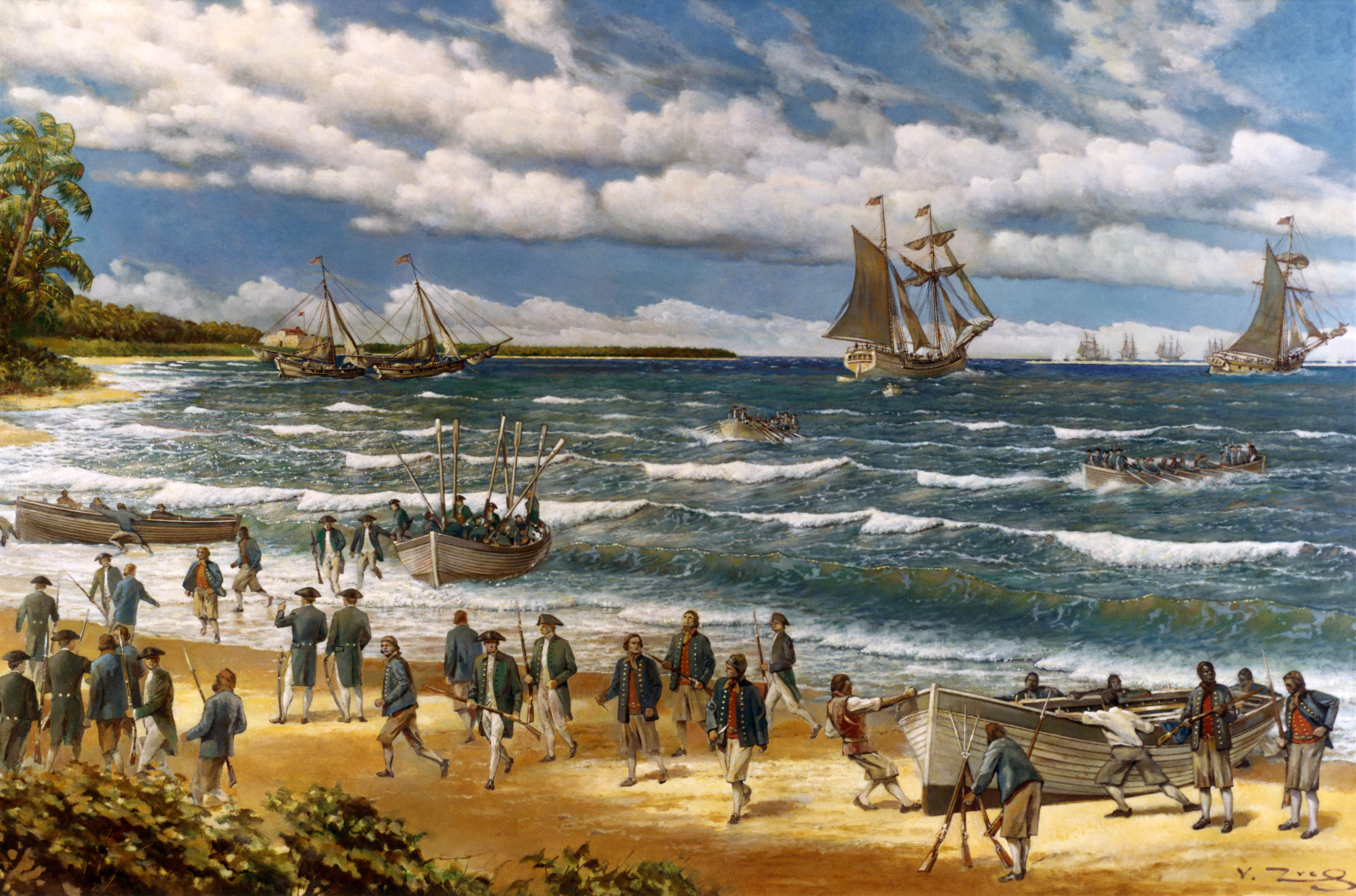
The American raid of Nassau, which preceded the battle at Block Island

HMS Glasgow was a sixth-rate 20-gun post ship of the Royal Navy. In early April 1776 under the command of Captain Tyringham Howe, she was carrying dispatches from Newport, Rhode Island, to the British fleet off Charleston, South Carolina. This fleet had been assembled to launch an assault on Charleston, which ultimately occurred in a failed attack in June.

The Second Continental Congress had established the Continental Navy in late 1775. By February 1776, the first ships of the navy were ready for their maiden voyage. Commodore Esek Hopkins was to lead a squadron of eight ships on an expedition to the Bahamas, where the British were known to have military stores. In early March, the squadron landed Marines on the island of New Providence and captured Nassau. Hopkins' squadron sailed north on March 17, including two British prizes, all loaded with military stores captured at Nassau. One ship was dispatched to Philadelphia while the rest of the American squadron sailed for the Block Island channel. The cruise was marked by outbreaks of a variety of diseases, including fevers and smallpox, which significantly reduced the crew's effectiveness.

By April 4, the squadron reached the waters off Long Island and proceeded to capture the 6-gun schooner HMS Hawk, which was also laden with supplies. The next day, the Americans captured the British merchantman Bolton. Hopkins continued to cruise off Block Island that night, hoping to catch more easy prizes. He organized his ships into a scouting formation of two columns. The right or eastern column was headed by USS Cabot and was followed by Hopkins' flagship USS Alfred, which had 20 guns and was the largest ship of the squadron. The left column was headed by the USS Andrew Doria and was followed by USS Columbus. Behind these came USS Providence, with USS Fly and USS Wasp trailing farther behind as escorts for the prizes. The need to provide crews for the prize ships further reduced the fighting effectiveness of Hopkins' squadron.

== Battle ==
The battle took place on a clear night with a nearly full moon. Andrew Doria and Glasgow spotted each other between 1:00 and 2:00 am on April 6, about eight leagues (20 to 24 nautical miles) southeast of Block Island with the squadron headed in a generally southerly direction. Glasgow was heading west, destined for Charleston. Captain Howe came about to investigate the squadron and closed to within hailing distance over the next 30 minutes. Commodore Hopkins gave no signals during this time, so the squadron formed no battle line. This resulted in a battle that Captain Nicholas Biddle of Andrew Doria later described as "helter-skelter".

Howe first came upon Cabot, whose captain was Hopkins' son John. Glasgow hailed Cabot for identification, to which the younger Hopkins replied, "The USS Columbus and USS Alfred, a 22-gun frigate." An overzealous seaman on his ship then tossed a grenade onto Glasgow's deck and battle began. Cabot, a lightly armed brig, fired one ineffective broadside of six-pound cannon shot. Glasgow countered with two broadsides from its heavier weaponry, killing Cabot's master, wounding Hopkins, and disabling the ship's steering. As Cabot drifted away, Alfred came up to engage Glasgow, and the two commenced a broadside duel. A shot from Glasgow early in the action broke the lines to Alfred's tiller, causing her to lose steering and exposing her to raking fire. Her drift also made it difficult for Biddle's Andrew Doria to join the action, because the ship also had to maneuver to avoid the drifting Cabot. Providence held back; Columbus was able to join the action late, but her fire was so wild that little to no damage was done to Glasgow.

Glasgow was exposed to fire from three ships, so Howe decided to break off the battle in order to avoid being boarded and made sail for Newport. Despite extensive damage to the sail and rigging, he pulled away from the pursuing American squadron, which was fully laden with its captured goods. Hopkins called off the chase after several hours in order to avoid an encounter with the British squadron at Newport. His only prize was Glasgow's tender, which the Americans brought to anchor in New London, Connecticut, on April 8.

== Aftermath ==
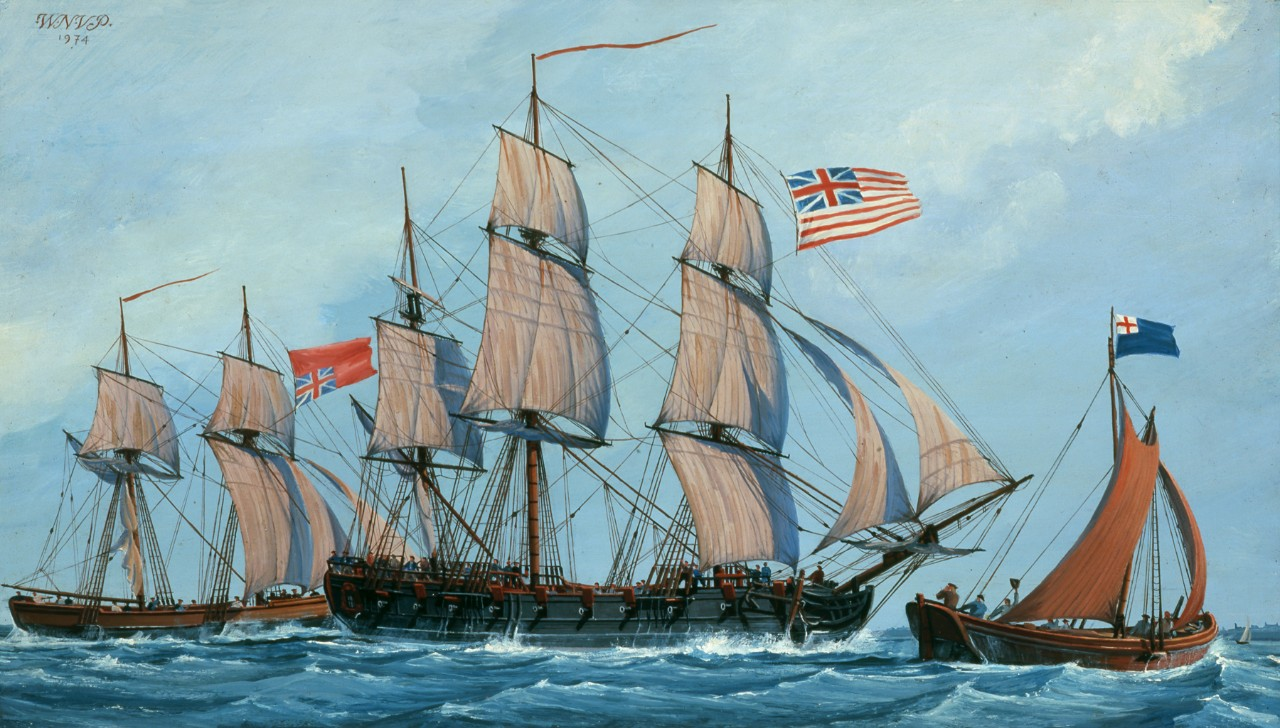
Columbus off New England in 1776

HMS Glasgow suffered one killed and three wounded, a low number which some consider to be evidence of poor quality in the American squadron's gunnery; all of the British casualties were the result of musket fire. Four were killed and seven wounded aboard Cabot; Alfred had six killed and six wounded, and Andrew Doria's drummer was wounded in the leg.

The president of the Continental Congress, John Hancock, praised Hopkins for the squadron's performance, while its failure to capture Glasgow led to Patriot criticism of the Continental Navy both in and out of Congress. Nicholas Biddle wrote of the action, "A more imprudent, ill-conducted affair never happened." Columbus Captain Abraham Whipple endured accusations of cowardice for a time and asked for a court-martial to clear his name. On May 6, 1776, a panel consisting of officers who had been on the cruise cleared Whipple of cowardice but criticized him for errors in judgment. Providence Captain John Hazard was charged with a variety of offenses by his subordinate officers, including neglect of duty during the engagement Glasgow. Hazard was convicted by court-martial and forced to surrender his commission.

Hopkins came under scrutiny from Congress over matters unrelated to the Block Island action. He had violated his written orders to sail to Virginia and the Carolinas, traveling to Nassau instead. He also distributed the goods taken during the cruise in Connecticut and Rhode Island without consulting Congress. He was censured for these transgressions. A number of Continental Navy ships suffered from crew shortages and became trapped at Providence, Rhode Island, by the British occupation of Newport late in 1776 and thus failed to sail again. In January 1778 Hopkins was dismissed from the Navy.

HMS Glasgow returned to Newport, suffering damage from the battle and having dumped her dispatches. She was found to be in bad shape; she was made as seaworthy as possible and sent to Portsmouth, Virginia, for repairs. Her mission was reassigned to HMS Nautilus, another ship in the Newport squadron.

== See also ==
- American Revolutionary War § Early Engagements. The Battle of Block Island placed in overall sequence and strategic context.
