= USS Alfred =

1774 frigate

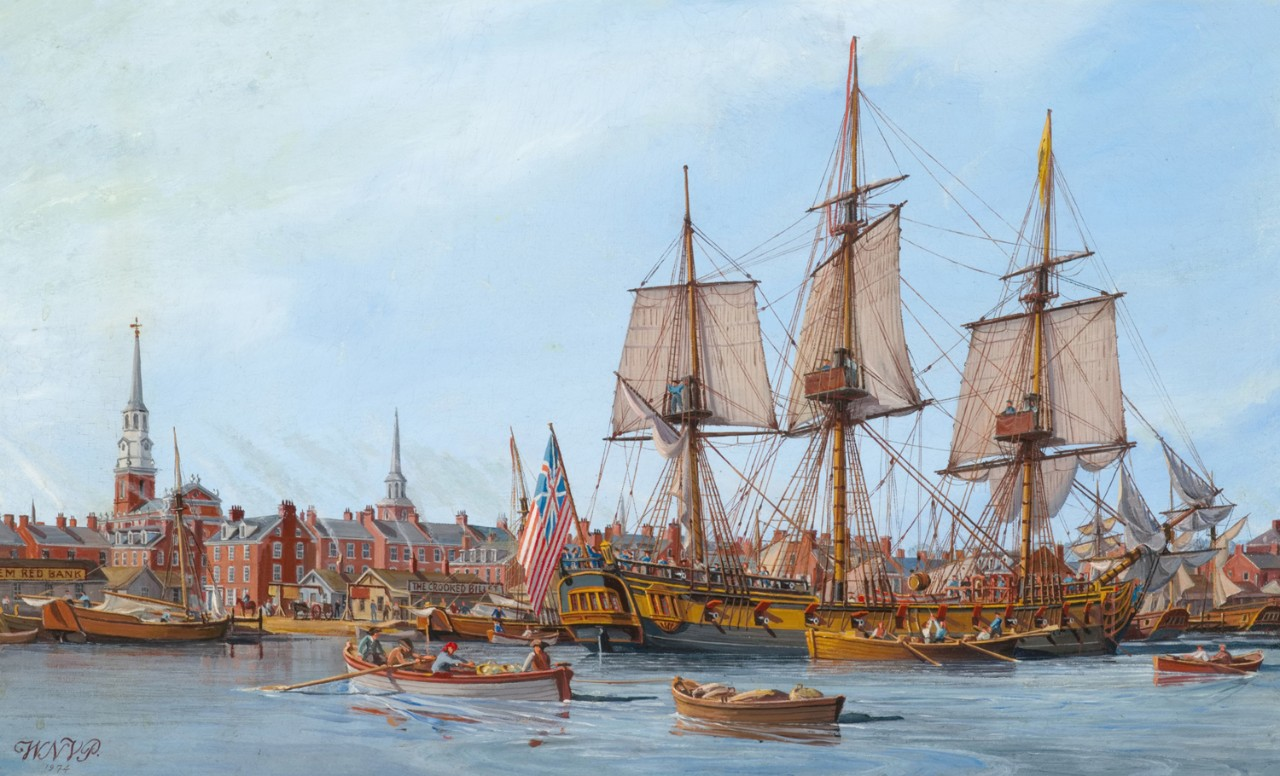
- Painting of Alfred by William Nowland Van Powell, depicting Lieutenant John Paul Jones hoisting the Continental Union Flag in Philadelphia on December 3, 1775

History

Great Britain
- Name: Black Prince
- Namesake: Edward the Black Prince
- Owner: Willing, Morris & Co.
- Launched: 1774
- Home port: Philadelphia, Pennsylvania
- Fate: Sold on December 3, 1775

United States
- Name: USS Alfred
- Namesake: Alfred the Great
- Ordered: November 4, 1775
- Commissioned: December 3, 1775
- Fate: Captured on March 9, 1778

Great Britain
- Name: HMS Alfred
- Acquired: March 1778
- Fate: Sold in 1782

Great Britain
- Name: Alfred
- Owner: T. Seale
- Acquired: 1782
- Notes: Still in service in 1789

General characteristics
- Tons burthen: 440 (bm)
- Length: 140 ft (43 m)
- Beam: 32 ft (9.8 m)
- Draft: 15 ft (4.6 m)
- Complement: 220 officers and men
- Armament: 20 × 9-pounder guns; 10 × 6-pounder guns

Service record
- Commanders: John Barry, Master (1774–76); Capt. Dudley Saltonstall (1776); Capt. John Paul Jones (1776–77); Capt. Elisha Hinman (1777–78)
- Operations: Battle of Nassau; Battle of Block Island

USS Alfred was a 24-gun frigate of the Continental Navy. She was originally the merchantman Black Prince which had been launched in 1774. The Continental Navy acquired her in 1775, renaming her Alfred and commissioning her as a frigate. In 1775, Alfred participated in the raid of Nassau and Battle of Block Island. The Royal Navy captured her in 1778 and took her into service as HMS Alfred before selling her in 1782. She then became the merchantman Alfred, and sailed between London and the British colony of Jamaica.

== Black Prince ==
Black Prince was built at Philadelphia, Pennsylvania in 1774. No record of her builder seems to have survived, but it is possible that John Wharton may have constructed the ship. She was owned by Willing, Morris & Co., a merchant trading firm operated by Thomas Willing and Robert Morris. John Barry served as the ship's only master during her career as a Philadelphia merchantman. Launched in the autumn of 1774 as relations between the colonies and the mother country grew increasingly tense, the Black Prince was fitted out quickly so that she could load and sail to Bristol on the last day of 1774. It did not return until April 25, 1775, six days after the Battle of Lexington.

Fearing that American commerce would soon be interrupted, her owners were eager to export another cargo to England, so they again raced to load and provision her. Black Prince sailed on May 7, this time bound for London. She did not reach that destination until June 27. The ship left the Thames on August 10 but encountered contrary winds during much of her westward voyage and finally returned to Philadelphia on October 4. While the ship had been abroad, the Battle of Bunker Hill had been fought, the other colonies acting in Congress had pledged to support Massachusetts in its struggle for freedom, and George Washington had taken command of the American Army besieging British-occupied Boston. Moreover, private correspondence, between shipowner Morris, and his trading partner, Richard Champion of Bristol, was brought from England on Black Prince to members of the Continental Congress. It reported that the British Government was sending to America two unarmed brigs heavily laden with gunpowder and arms.

This intelligence prompted Congress on October 13 to authorize the fitting out of two American warships, one of 10 guns and the other of an unspecified size, to attempt to capture these ships and divert their invaluable cargoes to the ill-equipped soldiers of Washington's army. Congress decided, on October 30, to specify the second vessel as being 14 guns and to add two more ships to the navy, one of 20 guns and the other slightly larger but not to exceed 36 guns. One of the ship's owners, Morris, was a member of the Marine Committee when that committee acquired the Alfred. A second ship, also owned by Willing Morris & Co. became the Columbus at the same time.

== USS Alfred ==
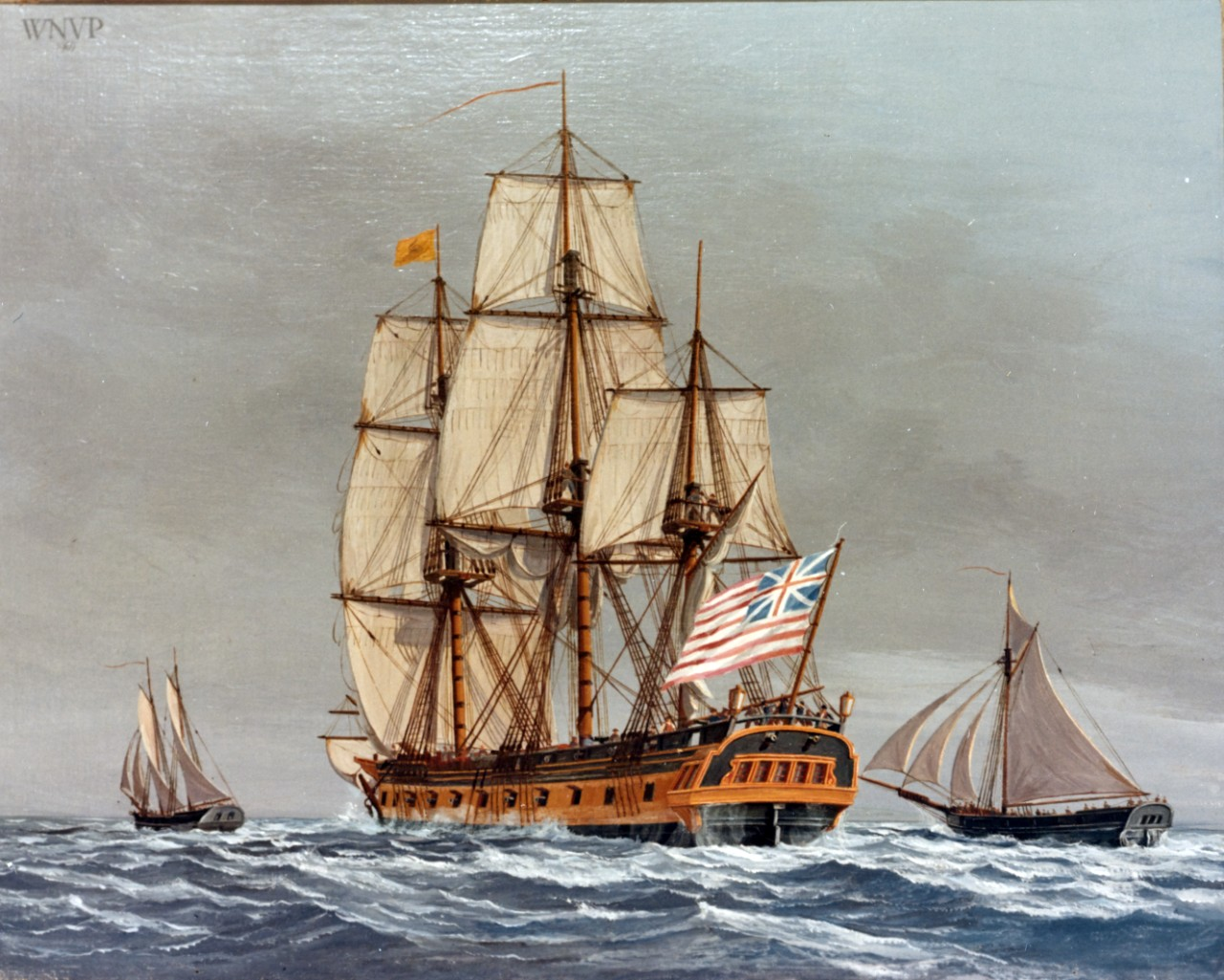
1969 painting of Alfred by William Nowland Van Powell

The Naval Committee of the Continental Congress purchased Black Prince on November 4, 1775, renaming her Alfred after 9th century English monarch Alfred the Great four days later, and ordered her fitted out as a man-of-war. Her former master, John Barry, was placed in charge of her rerigging; Joshua Humphreys was selected to superintend changes strengthening her hull, timbers, and bulwarks as well as opening gunports; and Nathaniel Falconer was made responsible for her ordnance and provisions. Soon four other vessels joined her in the Continental Navy: Columbus, Cabot, Andrew Doria, and sloop Providence. Esek Hopkins, a veteran master of merchantmen from Rhode Island, was appointed commodore of the flotilla. Alfred was acquired on December 3, 1775, Capt. Dudley Saltonstall in command, and became Hopkins' flagship. On the same day Alfred became the first vessel to fly the "Flag of America" (precursor to the U.S. flag). The ensign was hoisted on the Delaware by Lieutenant John Paul Jones and documented in letters to Congress.

The new fleet dropped down the Delaware on January 4, 1776; but a cold snap froze the river and the bay, checking its progress at Reedy Island for some six weeks. A thaw released Hopkins' warships from winter's icy grasp in mid-February, and the fleet sortied on 18 February for its first operation. The Marine Committee had ordered Hopkins to sail for Hampton Roads to attack British warships which were harassing American shipping in Virginia waters; then to render similar service at Charleston, South Carolina; and, finally, to head for Rhode Island waters. He was given the discretion of disregarding these orders if they proved impossible and planning an operation of his own. However, by the time his ships broke free of the ice, growing British strength in the Chesapeake prompted Hopkins to head for the West Indies. Knowing that the American colonies desperately needed gunpowder, he decided to attack the island of New Providence in the Bahamas to capture a large supply of that commodity as well as other military supplies reportedly stored there in great quantity.

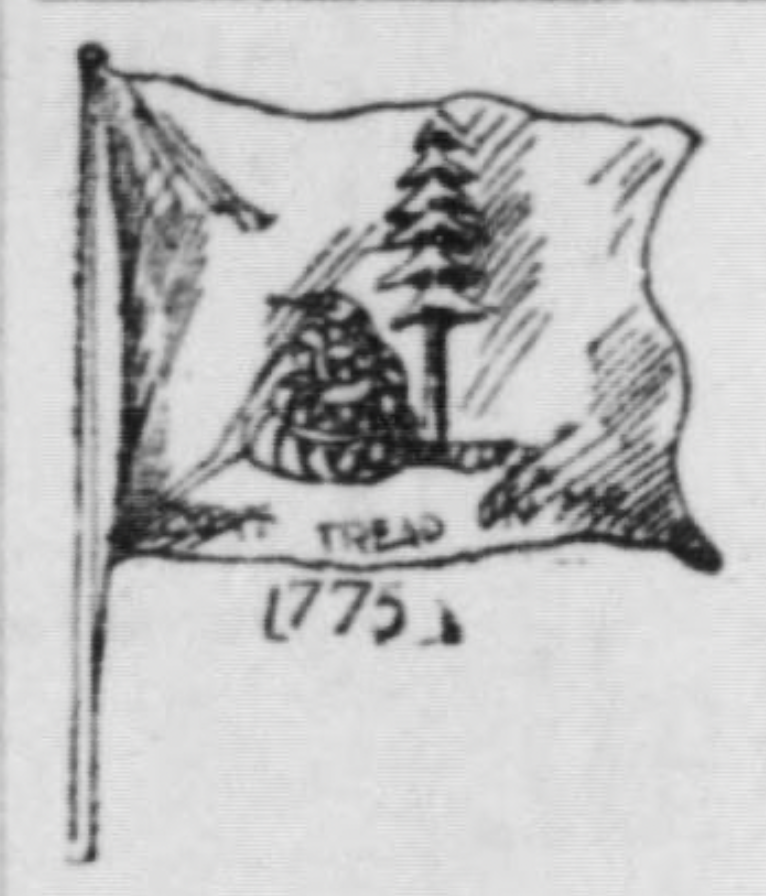
Another flag flown by the ship, 1775

A fortnight after leaving the Delaware capes, on the morning of March 3 Hopkins arrived off Nassau and captured Fort Montague in a bloodless Battle of Nassau, in which Continental Marines under Capt. Samuel Nicholas joined Hopkins' sailors in America's first amphibious operation. That evening, Hopkins issued a proclamation which promised not to harm "... the persons or property of the inhabitants of New Providence ..." if they did not resist. The following morning, Governor Montfort Browne surrendered Fort Nassau but only after he had spirited away most of the island's gunpowder from New Providence to St. Augustine, Florida.

After Hopkins stripped the forts of their guns and all remaining ordnance, Alfred led the American fleet homeward from Nassau harbor on St. Patrick's Day, March 17, the same day that British troops were evacuating Boston. On April 4, during the homeward voyage, Hopkins' ships captured the six-gun British schooner Hawk and the eight-gun brig Bolton. Shortly after midnight on April 6, Hopkins encountered the 20-gun Glasgow. That British frigate—which was carrying dispatches telling of the British withdrawal—put up a fierce and skillful fight which enabled her to escape from her substantially more powerful American opponents. At the outset of the fray, fire from her cannon cut Alfred's tiller ropes, leaving Hopkins' flagship unable to maneuver or to pursue effectively. The American ships did attempt to chase their fleeing enemy, but after dawn Glasgow disappeared over the horizon and safely reached Newport, Rhode Island. When Alfred and her consorts put into New London, Connecticut on April 8, the Americans were at first welcomed as heroes. still, many of the officers of the American squadron voiced dissatisfaction with Hopkins, and he was later relieved of command.

Alfred was inactive through the summer for a number of reasons, but high on the list of her problems were want of funds and a shortage of men. On August 7, Capt. John Paul Jones, who had helped to fit her out as a warship and had been her first lieutenant on the cruise to New Providence, was placed in command of the ship. She departed Providence, Rhode Island, on October 26, 1776, in company with Hampden, but that vessel struck a "sunken rock" before they could leave Narragansett Bay and returned to Newport. Her officers and men then shifted to sloop Providence accompanying Alfred to waters off Cape Breton Island which they reached by mid-November. There they took three prizes: on the 11th, the brigantine Active, bound from Liverpool to Halifax with an assorted cargo, the next day, the armed transport Mellish, laden with winter uniforms for British troops at Quebec; and, on the 16th, the scow Kitty, bound from Gaspé to Barbados with oil and fish.

Because of severe leaks, Providence sailed for home soon thereafter and Alfred continued her cruise alone. On November 22 boats from Alfred raided Canso, Nova Scotia, where their crews burned a transport bound for Canada with provisions, and a warehouse full of whale oil, besides capturing a small schooner to replace Providence. Two days later, Alfred captured three colliers off Louisburg, bound from Nova Scotia to New York with coal for the British Army and, on November 26 captured the 10-gun letter-of-marque John of Liverpool. On the homeward voyage, Alfred was pursued by HMS Milford but managed to escape after a four-hour chase. She arrived safely at Boston on December 15 and began a major refit.

Captain Elisha Hinman became Alfred's commanding officer in May 1777. She did not get underway until August 22 when she sailed for France with USS Raleigh to obtain military supplies. En route, they captured four small prizes, including brig "Sally" on September 28. They reached L'Orient on October 6, and on December 29 sailed for America. They proceeded via the coast of Africa, where they took a small sloop, and then headed for the West Indies, hoping to add to their score before turning northward for home. On March 9, 1778, near Barbados, they encountered British warships HMS Ariadne and HMS Ceres. When the American ships attempted to flee, Alfred fell behind her faster consort. Shortly after noon the British men-of-war caught up with Alfred and forced her to surrender after a half an hour's battle.

== HMS Alfred ==
Her captors took Alfred to Barbados where she was condemned and sold. The Royal Navy purchased her and took her into service as HMS Alfred, a sloop of 20 guns. The Admiralty sold her in 1782.

== Alfred ==
Lloyd's Register for 1789 shows an Alfred, of 400 tons (bm), built in Philadelphia, with master "Delamore" and owner T. Seale. Her trade is listed as London – Jamaica. Unfortunately there are no readily available interim or later issues of Lloyd's Register so her history as a merchant vessel is unclear.

== See also ==
- List of ships captured in the 18th century
