= Raid on Canso (1776) =

American raid on Nova Scotia

- Part of the American Revolutionary War
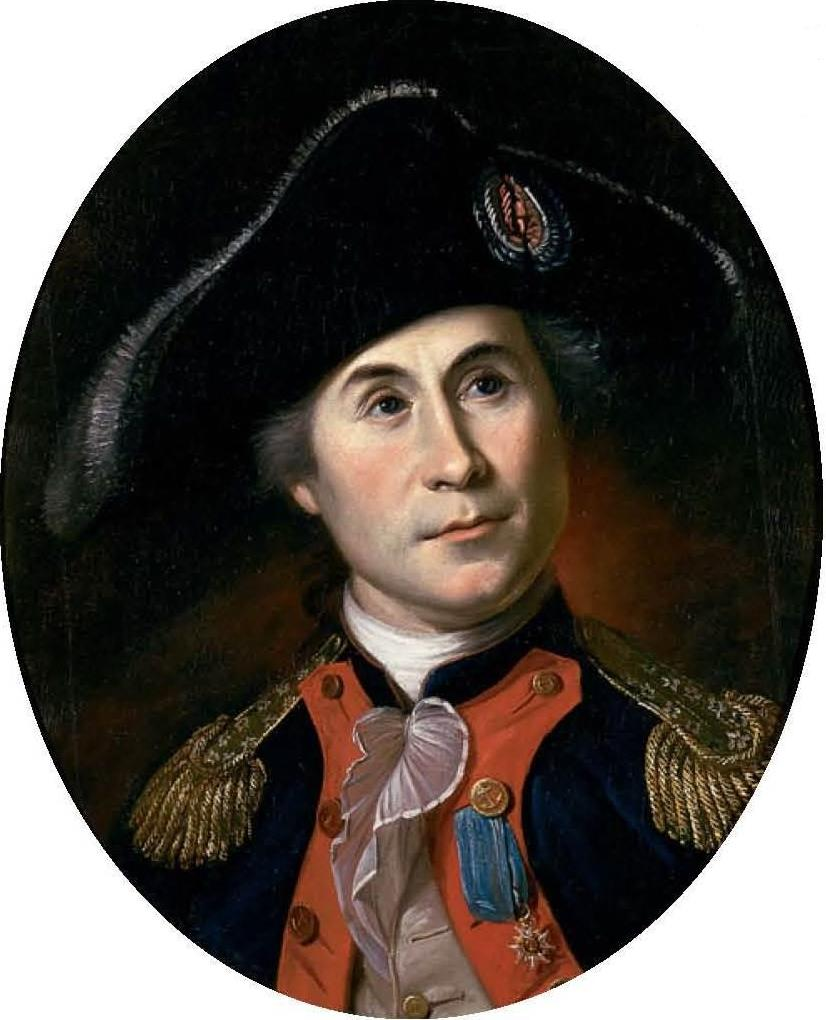
- John Paul Jones
Date	22 September – 22 November 1776
Location	Canso, Nova Scotia
Result	U.S. victory

Belligerents
United States	Great Britain

Commanders and leaders
John Paul Jones	(Kingdom of Great Britain) John Robin (merchant); George Smith (merchant) (POW)

Strength
2 brigs	Approximately 15 fishing vessels

Casualties and losses
None	1st attack: 3 vessels burned, 1 sunk, 5 prizes, 1 shallop confiscated; 2nd attack: 6 prizes, 1 burned, 1 confiscated

The Raid on Canso took place on 22 September–22 November 1776 during the American Revolutionary War. The raid involved American Continental Navy Captain John Paul Jones attacking Canso, Nova Scotia, and the surrounding fishing villages.

== Background ==
During the American Revolutionary War, American forces and privateers regularly attacked Nova Scotia by land and sea. American privateers devastated the maritime economy by raiding many of the coastal communities, such as the numerous raids on Liverpool and on Annapolis Royal.

George Washington's Marblehead Regiment raided Charlottetown, now in Prince Edward Island, on 17 November 1775, and three days later they raided Canso Harbor.

== Raid ==
On 22 September 1776, Continental Navy 1st Lieutenant John Paul Jones, captain of USS Providence, attacked Canso. He destroyed 15 vessels and damaged much property on shore. There he recruited men to fill the vacancies created by manning his prizes, burned a British fishing schooner, sank a second, and captured a third besides a shallop which he used as a tender.

Jones then pillaged the communities of Petit-de-Grat and Arichat. The nine ships (300 men) immediately surrendered. On the evening of 25 September a gale drove three of the prizes on to shore, destroying them. (The remaining prizes were Alexander, Kingston Packet, Success, and Defence.) Jones destroyed John Robin’s fishing business when they plundered and razed the entire establishment. The business of John Robin ended and he did not return until after the war. Jones then sailed to Boston.

On 22 November, Jones returned to Canso in USS Alfred. Boats from Alfred took a raiding party ashore; his crews burned a transport bound for Canada with provisions, and a warehouse full of whale oil, besides capturing a small schooner. In all, Jones took 6 prizes, 1 burned, 1 confiscated.

Jones then went on to present-day Sydney, Nova Scotia to free 300 Americans imprisoned in the British coalmines.

== Aftermath ==
In 1779, American privateers destroyed the Canso fisheries, worth $50,000 per year to England. American privateers remained a threat to Nova Scotian ports for the rest of the war, striking again in the Raid on Lunenburg in 1782.

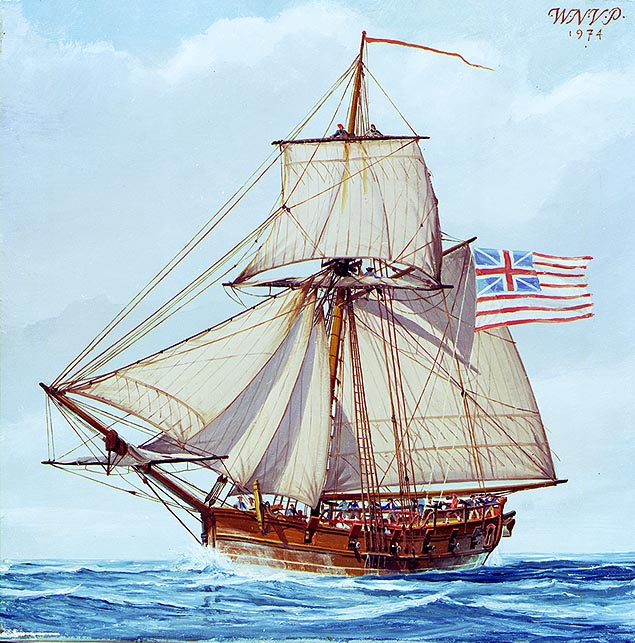
USS Providence

== See also ==
- American Revolution - Nova Scotia theatre
- Military history of Nova Scotia
