= USS Providence (1775) =

Sloop of the Continental Navy

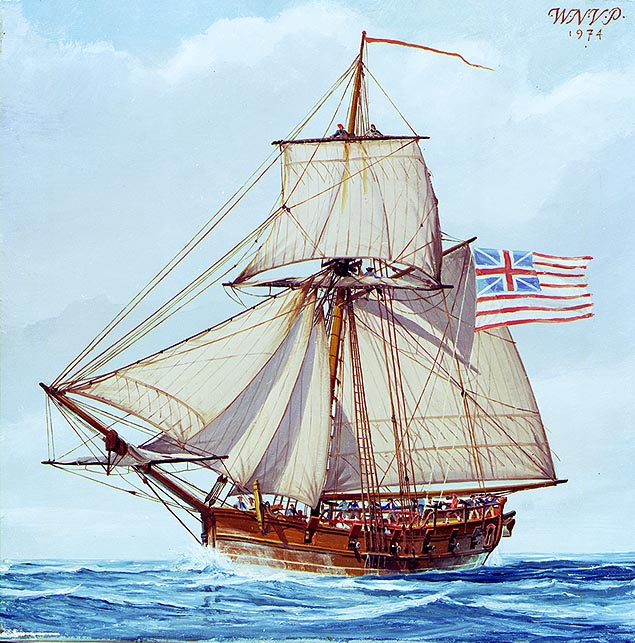

History

United States
- Name: Katy (pre-1775); USS Providence (1775–1779)
- Builder: John Brown of Providence, Rhode Island
- Cost: $1250
- Launched: about 1768
- Acquired: By Rhode Island, 15 June 1775
- Commissioned: Into Continental Navy, 3 December 1775
- Fate: Destroyed by her crew, 14 August 1779

General characteristics
- Type: Sloop
- Length: ~65 feet
- Beam: 20 feet
- Sail plan: jib, flying jib, staysail, square sail, and fore-and-aft mainsail
- Complement: 6 officers, 22 seamen, 26 Marines
- Armament: 12 × 4-pounder guns and 14 × railside swivel guns

Service record
- Commanders: Capt. Abraham Whipple; Capt. John Hazard; Capt. John Paul Jones; Capt. Hoysted Hacker; Capt. John Rathbun
- Operations: Battle of Nassau; Penobscot Expedition

USS Providence was a 12-gun sloop of the Continental Navy. Originally the Rhode Island State Navy ship Katy, she took part in a number of campaigns during the first half of the American Revolutionary War before being destroyed by her own crew in 1779 to prevent her falling into the hands of the British after the failed Penobscot Expedition.

== Service as Katy ==
From early 1775, Royal Navy warships, in particular the post ship Rose, carried out anti-smuggling operations off the New England coast. They frequently searched Rhode Island merchant shipping, annoying the colony's merchants. On 13 June, Deputy Governor Nicholas Cooke wrote the frigate's Captain James Wallace demanding restoration of several ships which Rose had detained. Two days later, the Rhode Island General Assembly ordered the committee of safety to fit out two ships to defend the colony's shipping, and appointed a committee of three to obtain the vessels. That day, the committee chartered the sloop Katy from John Brown of Providence and the sloop Washington at the same time. The General Assembly appointed Abraham Whipple as commander of Katy, the larger ship, and made him commodore of the tiny fleet. Whipple had won fame in burning the British armed schooner Gaspee in 1772, and he captured a tender to HMS Rose before sunset that same day. Katy then cruised in Narragansett Bay through the summer protecting coastal shipping.

Gunpowder was an essential commodity, scarce in the Continental Army throughout the Revolutionary War and desperately low during the first year of the struggle for independence. Late in the summer of 1775, the shortage in Washington's army besieging Boston became so severe that he was unable to use his artillery, and his riflemen would have been unable to repel an attack had the British taken the offensive. Cooke, therefore, ordered Whipple to cruise for two weeks off Sandy Hook, New Jersey to intercept a powder-laden packet expected from London. He was then to proceed to Bermuda to capture the powder stored in the British magazine there. Katy departed Narragansett Bay on 12 September but caught no sight of the packet. Upon reaching Bermuda, Whipple learned that the powder from the magazine was already en route to Philadelphia.

== Service as Providence ==
Katy was purchased by Rhode Island 31 October 1775, soon after she returned to Providence. Late in November, she sailed for Philadelphia carrying seamen enlisted by Commodore Esek Hopkins in New England for Continental service. She arrived on 3 December and was immediately taken into Continental service and renamed Providence.

Captain Whipple assumed command of USS Columbus, a larger ship, and Captain John Hazard was placed in command of Providence, formalized by a commission from the Continental Congress dated 9 January 1776. The ships joined a squadron being formed by Congress under the command of Esek Hopkins, who was Commander in Chief of the Fleet of the United Colonies; they ordered him to sail for Chesapeake Bay on 5 January 1776 and to clear waters there of a fleet organized the previous autumn by Governor Dunmore of Virginia. These ships were cruising in the shores of the bay and the rivers which empty into it. Once Whipple's ships had completed this task, they were to move south and attack British ships off the Carolina coast, then sail North to Rhode Island to perform a similar service.

Providence and her consorts departed Philadelphia early in January but were delayed by ice and did not get to sea until 17 February. Hopkins deemed it unwise to cruise along the southern coast and led his little fleet to the Abaco Islands in the Bahamas, which they reached on 1 March and staged for a raid on New Providence. The next day, they seized two sloops on which Hopkins placed a landing party of 200 marines and 50 sailors. The Americans went ashore unopposed on the eastern end of New Providence at mid-morning of the 3rd, under cover of the guns of Providence and Wasp. They advanced toward Fort Montagu which opened fire, interrupting the invaders' progress. The defenders spiked their guns and retreated to Fort Nassau. The next day, Nassau surrendered and gave the Americans the keys to the Fort. Hopkins then brought his ships into the harbor and spent two weeks loading captured munitions before heading home on 17 March.

Hopkins’ ships captured the schooner Hawk off Block Island on 4 April, belonging to the British fleet at Newport, Rhode Island, and they took the brig Bolton at dawn the next day. That evening, the Americans added a brigantine and a sloop to their list of prizes, both from New York. About 1 a.m. on 6 April, USS Andrew Doria sighted HMS Glasgow, a 20-gun sloop carrying dispatches from Newport to Charleston, South Carolina. Glasgow engaged the American squadron for one and a half hours, badly damaging it before sailing to Newport. After daylight, Hopkins ordered his ships to give up the chase and headed with his fleet and prizes for New London, Connecticut, where they arrived on the 8th.

"You are to take command of the sloop Providence and put her in the best condition you can – and you are to take soldiers on board that belong to General Washington's army and carry them to New York as soon as you can."

— Excerpt from the 1776 orders from Commodore Hopkins to Lieutenant Jones, appointing him to Providence's command.

Lieutenant John Paul Jones took command of Providence on 10 May and made a voyage to New York, returning about 100 soldiers to the Continental Army whom Washington had lent to Hopkins to help man the American fleet, and Jones then hove down the ship to clean her bottom. She sailed again on 13 June, escorting Fly to Fishers Island at the entrance to Long Island Sound. He recaptured a brigantine which had been captured by the British frigate Cerberus, bringing munitions from Hispaniola.

Providence next escorted a convoy of colliers to Philadelphia, arriving 1 August, and Jones received his permanent commission as captain a week later. Providence departed the Delaware Capes on the 21st to begin an independent cruise; she took the brigantine Britannia soon after and sent her into Philadelphia under a prize crew. On 1 September, daring seamanship enabled Jones to escape from the British frigate Solebay. Two days later, Providence captured the Bermudan brigantine Sea Nymph carrying sugar, rum, ginger, and oil and sent her to Philadelphia. On the 6th, Providence caught the brigantine Favourite carrying sugar from Antigua to Liverpool, but HMS Galatea recaptured the prize before she could reach an American port.

Turning north, Jones headed for Nova Scotia and escaped another frigate on 20 September before his raid on Canso two days later. There he recruited men to fill the vacancies created by manning his prizes, burned a British fishing schooner, sank a second, and captured a third besides a shallop which he used as a tender. Providence took several more prizes fishing near Ile Madame before riding out a severe storm. The whaler Portland surrendered to her before she returned to Narragansett Bay on 8 October.

While Providence was at home, Hopkins appointed Jones the commander of Alfred, a larger ship and the Commander in Chief's flagship on the expedition to the Bahamas, and Captain Hoysted Hacker took command of Providence. The two ships got under way 11 November. They took the brigantine Active after ten days and the armed transport Mellish the next day, carrying winter uniforms and military supplies for the British Army. On the 16th, they captured the snow Kitty. Providence had been troubled by leaks which developed during bad weather on the cruise, so she headed back for Rhode Island and arrived at Newport two days later.

The British seized Narragansett Bay in December 1776 and Providence retired up the Providence River with other American vessels. She ran the British blockade in February 1777 under Lt. Jonathan Pitcher and put into New Bedford, then cruised to Cape Breton where she captured a transport brig loaded with stores and carrying two officers and 25 soldiers of the British Army, besides her crew. She made two cruises on the coast under command of Captain John Peck Rathbun, and sailed from Georgetown, N.C. about mid-January 1778, again bound for New Providence in the Bahamas but this time alone. On 27 January, she spiked the guns of the fort at Nassau, taking military stores including 1,600 pounds of powder and releasing 30 American prisoners. She also captured 16-gun British ship "Mary" (sold in July) and recaptured five other vessels which had been brought in by the British. On 30 January, the prizes were manned and sailed away, except two that were burned, and Providence put into New Bedford with her armed prize.

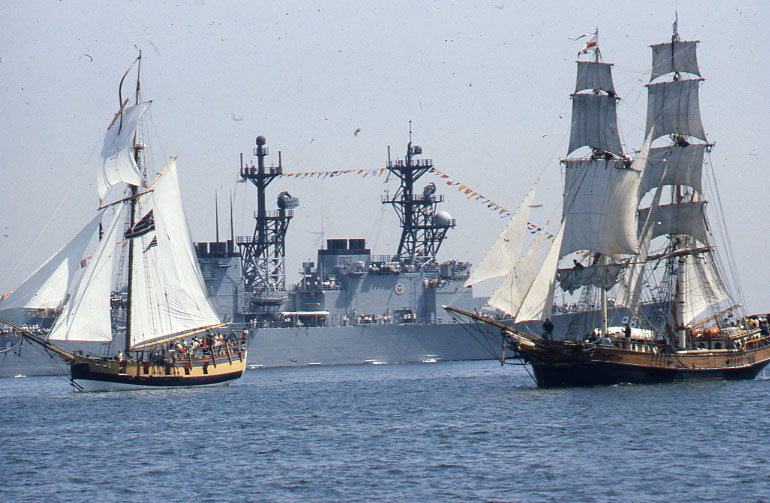
On the left, the replica Providence in Boston, 1980

During the early part of April 1779, Providence was ordered to make a short cruise in Massachusetts Bay and along the coast of Maine. She later sailed south of Cape Cod and captured the brig HMS Diligent, 12 guns off Sandy Hook on 7 May. She fired two broadsides and a volley of muskets during the engagement and Diligent was forced to surrender, with mast rigging and hull cut to pieces. Providence was then assigned to Commodore Saltonstall's squadron which departed Boston on 19 July 1779 and entered Penobscot Bay 25 July.

Providence was scuttled by her crew, along with other American vessels in the Penobscot River on 14 August 1779 to prevent her from falling into the hands of the British towards the end of the failed Penobscot Expedition.

== Reproduction ==
In the early 1970s a reproduction of the Providence was constructed with a fiberglass hull and was used for youth sail training. The ship was maintained by the Providence Maritime Heritage Foundation. The ship was commissioned by John Fitzhugh Millar who was the captain of the replica frigate Rose in the 1970s.

She was launched in 1976 and designated in 1992 as the flagship and tall ship ambassador of the state of Rhode Island. The ship was in drydock for the winter of 2015, when she was toppled and severely damaged by high winds during the January 2015 nor'easter.

Providence is currently docked in Alexandria, Virginia, under the care of the Tall Ship Providence Foundation. The ship now offers tours, sails, and educational programs to tourists and locals alike.
