= USS Whipple =

The name USS Whipple has been borne by three ships in the United States Navy. All were named for Commodore Abraham Whipple, a naval commander in the American Revolutionary War.

- USS Whipple (DD-15), a torpedo boat destroyer commissioned 1903, decommissioned 1919.
- USS Whipple (DD-217), a destroyer commissioned in 1920 and decommissioned in 1945.
- USS Whipple (FF-1062), a destroyer escort commissioned in 1970, redesignated a frigate in 1975 and decommissioned in 1992.
