= Raid of Nassau =

1776 raid of the American Revolutionary War

- Part of the American Revolutionary War
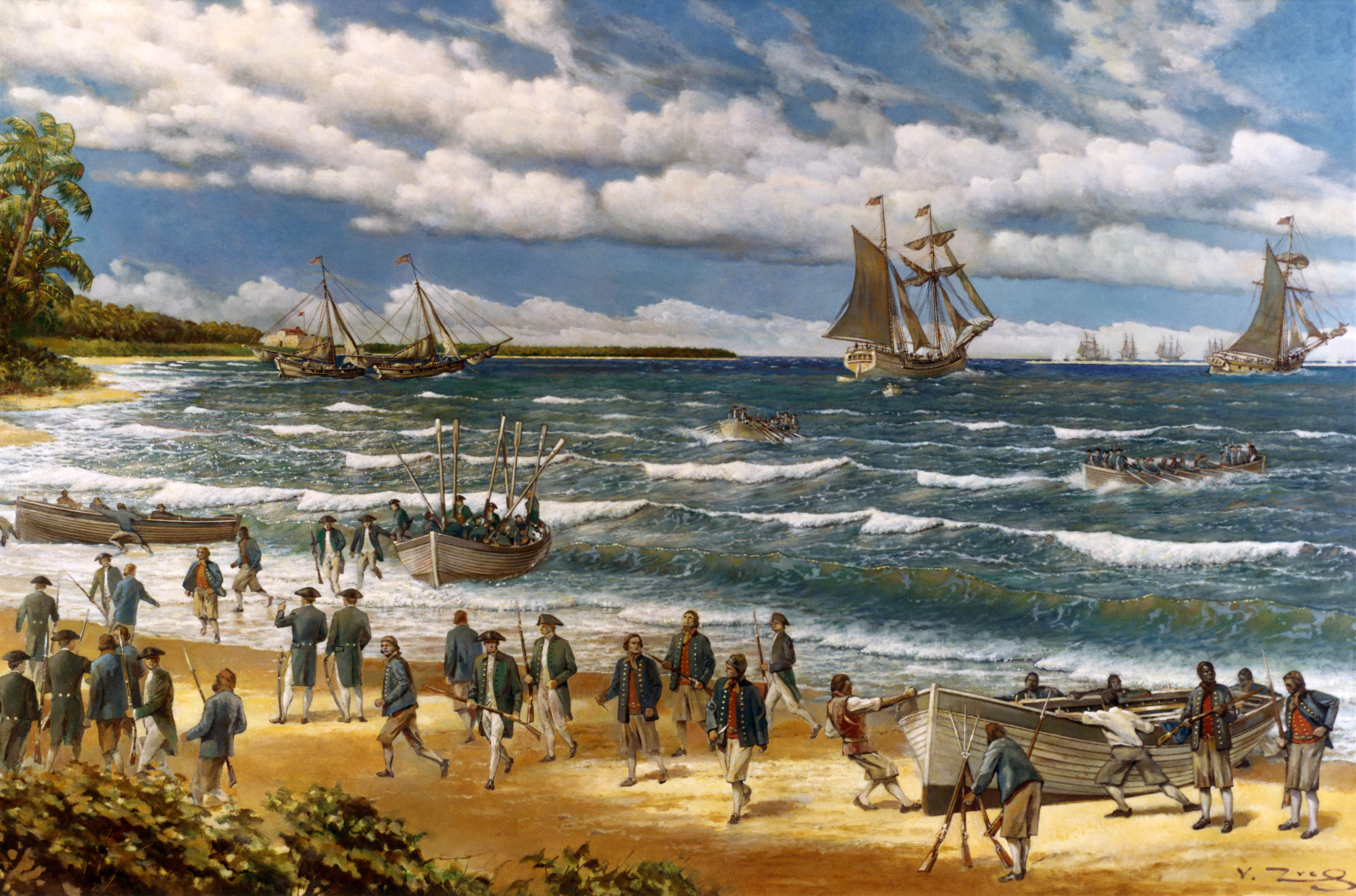
- 1973 painting of the raid
Date	March 3–4, 1776
Location	Nassau, Bahamas 25.06°N 77.345°W
Result	American victory

Belligerents
United Colonies	Great Britain

Commanders and leaders
Esek Hopkins; Samuel Nicholas	Montfort Browne (surrendered)

Strength
2 frigates; 2 brigs; 1 schooner; 1 sloop	2 forts

Casualties and losses
Unknown	Unknown

The raid of Nassau (Note: Also known as the Battle of Nassau.) on March 3–4, 1776, was a naval operation and amphibious assault by American forces against the British port of Nassau, Bahamas, during the American Revolutionary War. The raid, designed to resolve the issue of gunpowder shortages, resulted in the seizure of two forts and large quantities of military supplies before the raiders drew back to New England.

During the American Revolutionary War, the Patriot forces suffered from a shortage of gunpowder. In response to such shortages, the Second Continental Congress ordered an American fleet under the command of Commodore Esek Hopkins to patrol the Virginia and Carolina coastlines; secret orders were possibly given to Hopkins instructing him to raid Nassau, where stocks of gunpowder removed from Virginia had been sent.

The fleet departed Cape Henlopen, Delaware, on February 17, 1776, arriving at the Bahamas on March 1. Two days later, 200 Continental Marines came ashore, seizing Fort Montagu but not advancing upon the town, where the gunpowder was stored. Governor Montfort Browne had most of Nassau's gunpowder loaded aboard ships sailing for St. Augustine. On March 4, the Marines captured Nassau. Occupying Nassau for two weeks, the Americans seized any remaining military supplies they found before departing.

== Background ==
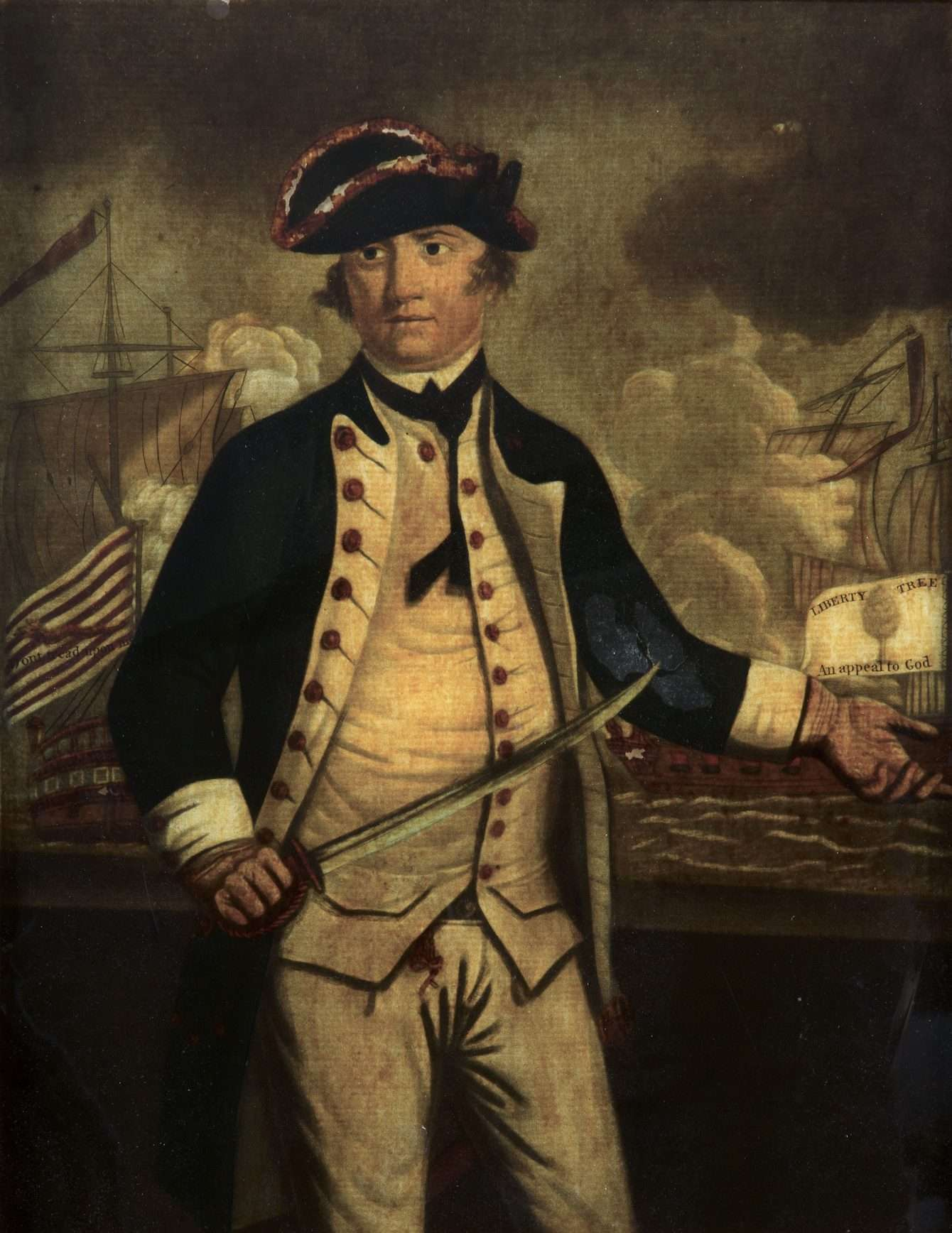
Esek Hopkins, who led the raid

When the American Revolutionary War broke out in 1775, Lord Dunmore, the colonial governor of Virginia, ordered Royal Navy sailors under his command to remove the gunpowder from the Williamsburg gunpowder magazine to the island of New Providence in the British colony of the Bahamas, in order to keep it from falling into the hands of Patriot militia. The colonial governor of the Bahamas, Montfort Browne, was alerted by British General Thomas Gage in August 1775 that the Americans might make attempts to seize the gunpowder stored in the Bahamas.

The desperate shortage of gunpowder available to the Continental Army led the Second Continental Congress to organize a naval expedition, with the intention of seizing military supplies stored at Nassau. While the official orders issued by the Congress to Commodore Esek Hopkins, the naval officer selected to lead the expedition, included only instructions for patrolling the Virginia and Carolina coastlines and raiding British naval targets, additional instructions may have been given to Hopkins in secret meetings held by the Congress naval committee. The instructions that Hopkins issued to his fleet's captains before it set sail from Cape Henlopen, Delaware, on February 17, 1776, included instructions to rendezvous at the Great Abaco Island in the Bahamas.

Hopkins' fleet consisted of Alfred, Hornet, Wasp, Fly, Andrew Doria, Cabot, Providence, and Columbus. In addition to ships' crews, the fleet carried 200 Continental Marines under the command of Samuel Nicholas. In spite of gale force winds, the fleet remained together for two days, when Fly and Hornet became separated from the fleet. Hornet was forced to return to port for repairs, and Fly eventually rejoined the main fleet at Nassau, after the raid took place. Hopkins did not let the apparent loss of the two ships dissuade him; he had intelligence that much of the British fleet was in port due to high winds.

== Prelude ==
Browne received further intelligence in late February that an American fleet was assembling off the Delaware coast, but apparently he took no significant actions to prepare a defense. New Providence's harbor had two primary defenses, Fort Nassau and Fort Montagu. Fort Nassau was located in Nassau but was poorly equipped to defend the port against amphibious attacks, as its walls were not strong enough to support the action of the fort's 46 cannons. As a result, Fort Montagu had been constructed in 1742 on the eastern end of the harbor, overlooking its entrance. At the time of the raid, Fort Montagu was equipped with 17 cannons, although most of the gunpowder and ordnance was located at Fort Nassau.

Hopkins' fleet arrived at Great Abaco Island on March 1, 1776. The fleet captured two Loyalist-owned sloops, one of which was captained by Loyalist Gideon Lowe of Green Turtle Cay, and pressed their owners to serve as pilots. George Dorsett, a local ship's captain, travelled from Abaco to Nassau and alerted Browne to the presence of the American fleet. The Marine landing force was transferred to the two captured sloops and Providence the next day, and plans were formulated for the assault on Nassau. While the main fleet held back, the three ships carrying the landing force were to enter Nassau's port at daybreak on March 3, and gain control of the town before alarm could be raised.

The decision to land at daybreak turned out to be a tactical mistake by Hopkins, as alarm was raised in Nassau when the three ships were spotted in the morning light, rousing Browne from his bed. He ordered four guns fired from Fort Nassau to alert the colonial militia; two of the guns came off their mounts when they were fired. At 7:00 a.m. he held a discussion with Samuel Gambier, one of his councilors, over the idea that the gunpowder should be removed from the islands on Mississippi Packet, a fast ship docked in the harbor. They ultimately refrained from acting on the idea, but Browne ordered 30 mostly-unarmed militiamen to occupy Fort Montagu before retiring to his house to make himself "a little decent".

== Battle ==
=== Landing and capture ===
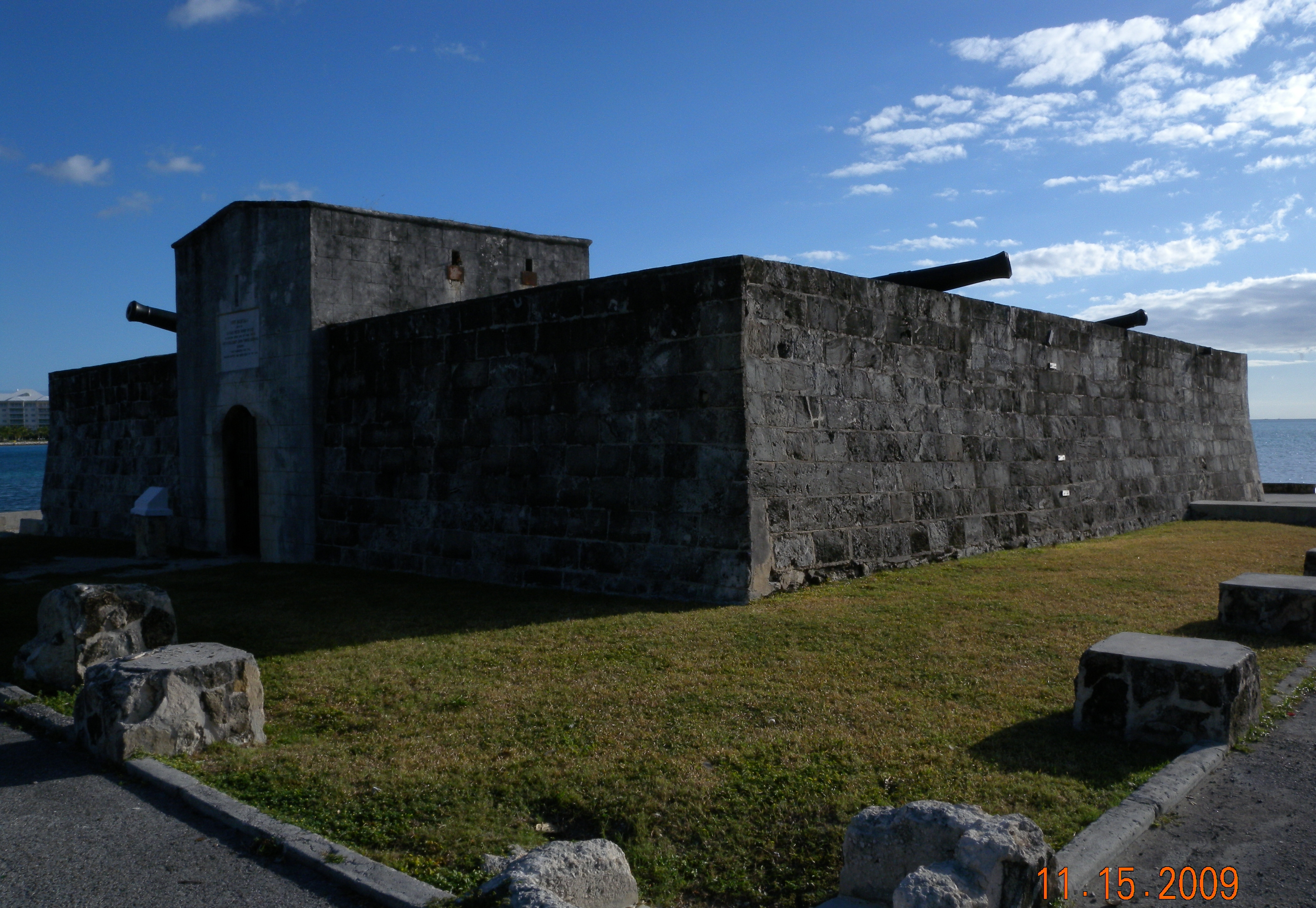
Fort Montagu in 2009

When the attackers heard the guns at Fort Nassau, they realized they lost the element of surprise and aborted the assault. The elements of the fleet then rejoined in Hanover Sound, roughly six nautical miles east of Nassau. There Hopkins held council, and a new plan of attack was developed. In some accounts, Hopkins' lieutenant, John Paul Jones, suggested a new landing point and then led the action. But one historian argues that this was unlikely, as Jones was unfamiliar with the local waters, unlike many of the captains present in the council. It is also possible that the landing force was led by Cabot's lieutenant, Thomas Weaver, who was also familiar with the area. With the force enlarged by 50 sailors, the three ships—with Wasp offering additional covering support—carried it to a point south and east of Fort Montagu, where they made an unopposed landing between 12:00 and 2:00 pm. This was the first amphibious landing conducted by what would become the United States Marine Corps.

A British lieutenant named Burke led a detachment out from Fort Montagu to investigate the American activity. Given that he was severely outnumbered, he opted to send a flag of truce to determine their intentions. From this he learned that their objective was the seizure of powder and military stores. In the meantime, Browne arrived at Fort Montagu with another 80 militiamen. Upon learning the size of the advancing force, he ordered three of the fort's guns fired and withdrew all but a few men back to Nassau. Browne retired to the governor's house, and most of the militiamen also returned to their homes rather than attempting to resist the Americans. Browne sent Burke out to parley with the American force a second time, in order to "wait on the command officer of the enemy to know his errand and on what account he had landed his troops."

The firing of Montagu's guns had given Nicholas cause for concern, but his men had by now occupied the fort, and he was consulting with his officers on their next move when Burke arrived. They obligingly repeated to Burke that they had arrived to take the powder and weapons and were prepared to assault the town. Burke brought this news back to Browne around 4:00 pm. Rather than advance further on Nassau, Nicholas and his force, consisting of 200 Marines and 50 sailors, remained at Fort Montagu that night. Browne held a war council that evening, in which the decision was made to attempt the removal of the gunpowder. At midnight, 162 of 200 barrels of gunpowder were loaded onto Mississippi Packet and HMS St John, and at 2:00 am they sailed out of Nassau harbor, bound for St. Augustine, Florida. This feat was made possible because Hopkins had neglected to post even a single ship to guard the harbor's entrance channels, leaving the fleet safely anchored in Hanover Sound. Marines occupied Nassau without resistance the next morning after a leaflet written by Hopkins was distributed throughout the town. (Note: The leaflet stated: "To the Gentlemen, Freemen, & Inhabitants of the Island of New Providence: The reasons of my landing an armed force on the island is in order to take possession of the powder and warlike stores belonging to the Crown, and if I am not opposed in putting my design in execution the persons and property of the inhabitants shall be safe, neither shall they be suffered to be hurt in case they make no resistance.") They were met en route by a committee of the town's leaders, who offered up the town's keys.

=== Return voyage ===
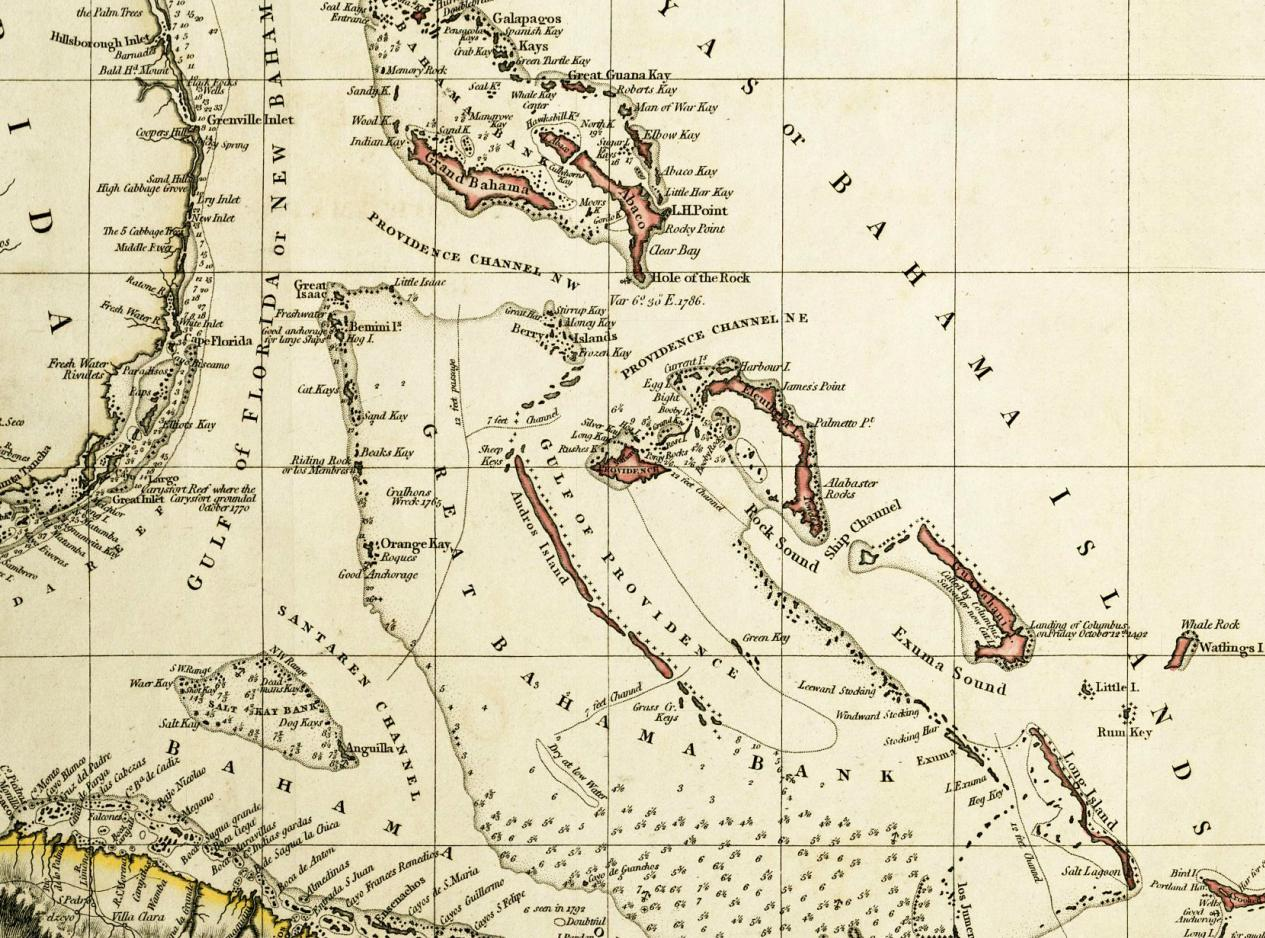
1803 map of Nassau; the harbor entrances are on either side of Hog Island, just north of Nassau

Hopkins and his fleet remained at Nassau for two weeks, loading as much military supplies as would fit onto the ships, including the remaining 38 casks of gunpowder. He pressed into service a local sloop, Endeavour, to carry some of the material. Browne complained that the American officers consumed most of his liquor stores during the occupation and also wrote that he was taken in chains like a "felon to the gallows" when he was arrested and taken onboard Alfred.

During their sojourn at Nassau, Fly arrived. Her captain reported that she and Hornet had fouled their rigging together and that Hornet suffered significant damage as a consequence. On March 17, the fleet sailed for Block Island off Newport, Rhode Island, with Browne and other colonial officials as prisoners of war.

The return voyage was uneventful until the fleet reached the waters of Long Island. On April 4, they encountered and captured HMS Hawk, and the next day captured Bolton, which was laden with stores that included more armaments and powder. The fleet finally met resistance on April 6, when it encountered HMS Glasgow, a sixth-rate frigate. In the ensuing action, the outnumbered Glasgow managed to escape capture, severely damaging Cabot in the process, wounding her captain, Hopkins' son John Burroughs Hopkins, and killing or wounding eleven others. The fleet sailed into the harbor at New London, Connecticut, on April 8.

== Aftermath ==
While Hopkins was initially lauded for the successful raid, the failure to capture Glasgow and crew complaints about some of the captains in the fleet led to a variety of investigations and courts martial. As a result of these, Providence's captain was relieved of his command, which was given to Jones. Jones, who had performed well in the engagement with Glasgow in spite of a crew reduced in number by disease, thereafter received a captain's commission in the Continental Navy, where he went on to engage in several naval engagements off Nova Scotia.

The manner by which Hopkins distributed the spoils was criticized by several congressmen, and his failure to follow his orders to patrol the Virginia and Carolina coasts resulted in censure from the Continental Congress. After a series of further missteps and accusations, Hopkins was dismissed from the Navy on January 2, 1778, having spent the last two years blockaded in Narragansett Bay by the British. Reports of Hopkins torturing British prisoners of war, as claimed by fellow naval officers Richard Marven and Samuel Shaw, contributed to his dismissal.

Browne was eventually exchanged for American General William Alexander, who had been captured at the Battle of Long Island; after his return, Browne was severely criticized for his handling of the whole affair. Nassau remained relatively poorly defended and was again subjected to the threat of an American attack in January 1778. It was then captured by Spanish forces under the command of Bernardo de Gálvez in 1782, but was recaptured by Loyalists the next year; the 1783 Treaty of Paris, which ended the war, confirmed the islands as being under British control.

The U.S. Navy ship USS Nassau (LHA-4), a Tarawa-class amphibious assault ship, was named in recognition of this battle, while the Oliver Hazard Perry-class frigate USS Nicholas (FFG-47) was named after Samuel Nicholas.

== See also ==
- List of American Revolutionary War battles
