= Abraham Whipple =

Continental Navy officer

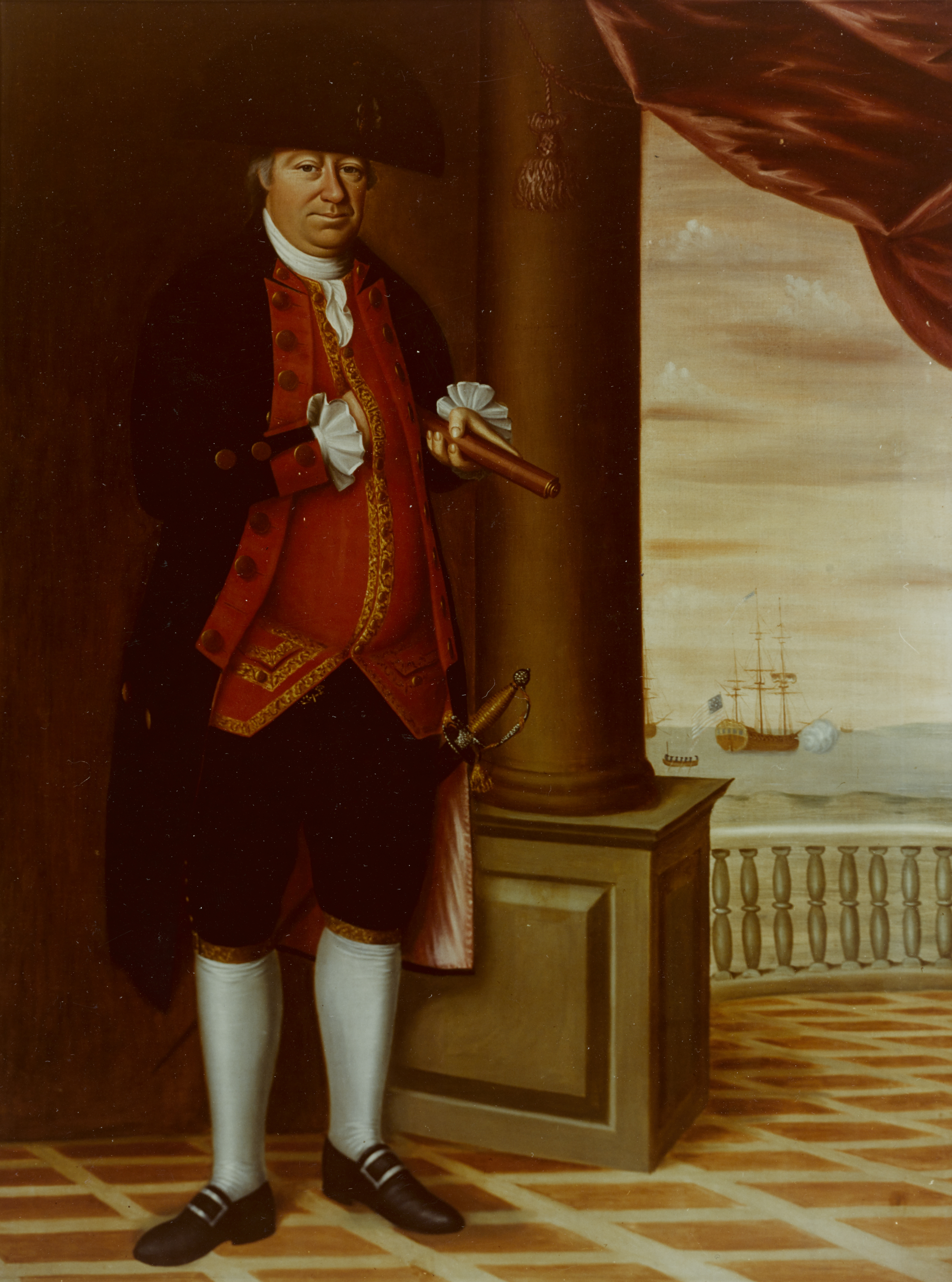
- 1786 portrait of Whipple by Edward Savage

Personal details
- Born: September 26, 1733 Providence, Rhode Island, British America
- Died: May 27, 1819 (aged 85) Marietta, Ohio, U.S.
- Resting place: Mound Cemetery, Marietta
- Relations: Ebenezer Sproat (son-in-law)

Military service
- Allegiance: Kingdom of Great Britain; United States
- Branch/service: Privateer (Britain); Continental Navy
- Years of service: 1759-1760; 1775–1780
- Rank: Commodore
- Commands: Game Cock
- Battles/wars: French and Indian War; American Revolutionary War; Siege of Charleston (POW)

Commodore Abraham Whipple (September 26, 1733 – May 27, 1819) was a Continental Navy officer who served in the American Revolutionary War and co-founded Marietta, Ohio. Born near Providence, Rhode Island, Whipple chose to be a sailor early in his life and embarked on a career in the lucrative colonial trade with the West Indies, working for Moses and John Brown.

In 1772, Whipple burnt the first British naval casualty of the American Revolution, the revenue cutter Gaspee, in the Gaspée affair. After the war he was the first to unfurl an American flag in London. Whipple was also the first to sail an ocean-going ship 2000 miles downriver from Ohio to the Caribbean, which opened trade with the Northwest Territory. He was a member of Society of the Cincinnati's Rhode Island branch.

== Family and early life ==
Whipple was born on September 26, 1733, to Noah Whipple Jr. and Mary Whipple (née Dexter).

During the French and Indian War, he became a privateer and commanded the ship Game Cock from 1759 to 1760. In one six-month cruise, he captured 23 French ships.

Abraham Whipple and Sarah Hopkins were married on August 2, 1761. They had three children: John, Catherine, and Mary. Catherine later married Colonel Ebenezer Sproat of the Continental Army.

Whipple sold enslaved people as part of his mercantile career; in November 1763, Whipple sold an enslaved woman named Deuse to Nicholas Brown & Co.

== Revolutionary activities ==
=== Rhode Island ===
As American colonists began to express their opposition to the policies of the Crown, acts of defiance became increasingly prevalent. An early incident occurred on June 9, 1772, when Whipple led 50 Rhode Islanders in the capture and burning of the British revenue cutter Gaspee. The ship had run aground off Pawtuxet while chasing the packet Hannah. The burning initiated an exchange of notes between Whipple and Captain James Wallace of HMS Rose. Wallace wrote, "You Abraham Whipple on June 10, 1772, burned his majesty's vessel the Gaspee and I will hang you at the yard arm." Whipple responded, "Always catch a man before you hang him."

Three years later, the Rhode Island General Assembly appointed Whipple commodore of the newly established Rhode Island Navy, which initially consisted of two sloops placed under his command: Katy (of 10 guns, 14 swivel guns and a crew of 80) and the smaller Washington, which were purchased for the defense of the colony's trade. Whipple commanded Katy, while John Grimes captained Washington.

On June 15, 1775, the day he received his commission, Whipple led his men to capture the tender of the frigate HMS Rose, in the process firing the first cannon shot at the Royal Navy in the Revolutionary War. After cruising in the vicinity of Narragansett Bay, he headed south to Bermuda to procure gunpowder for the colony. Later, Whipple transported Commodore Esek Hopkins—the first commander of the new Continental Navy—and naval recruits to Philadelphia, with instructions to remain in the service of the Continental Congress if Congress so desired. Upon her arrival there, Katy was taken over by agents of Congress and fitted out as the sloop-of-war USS Providence.

A report from Philadelphia sent to London of 16 November 1775 says a certain Captain Whipple was cruzing in a 12 gun sloop trying to capture the outbound Packet mail ship

=== Naval command ===
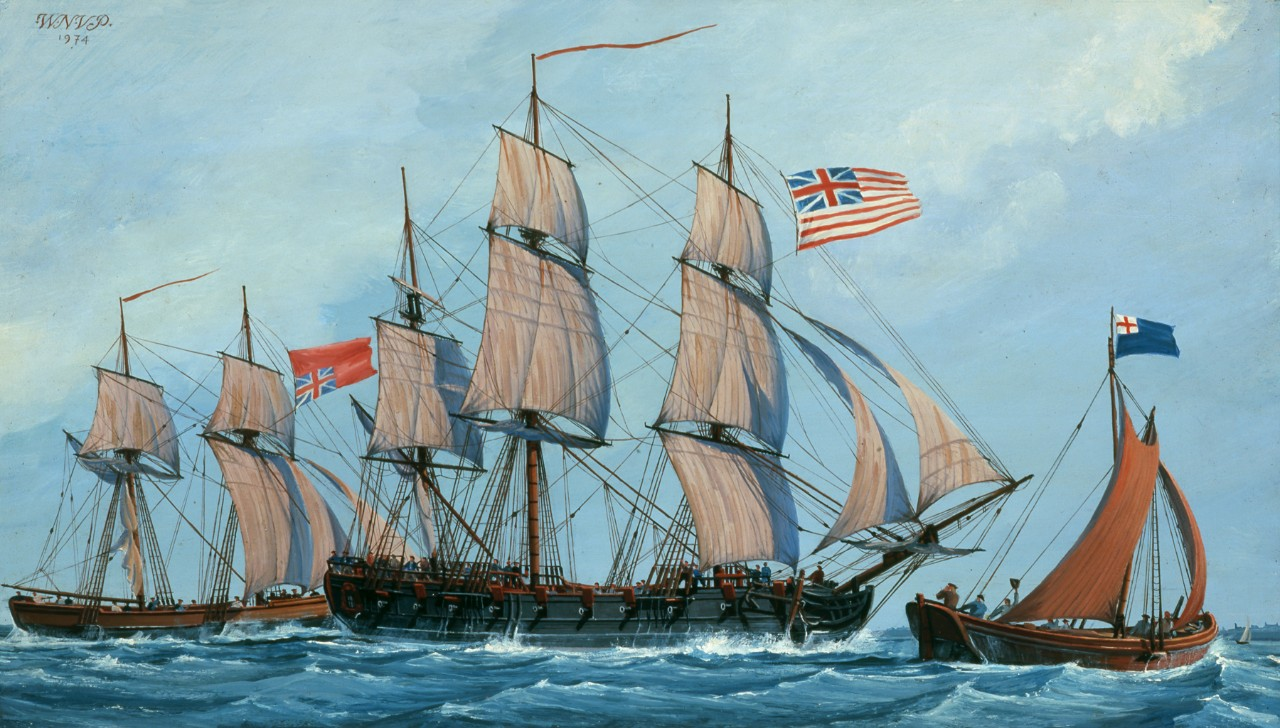
USS Columbus under Whipple bringing the captured British brig Lord Lifford in tow off New England, 1776

Whipple was commissioned a captain in the Continental Navy on December 22 and was given command of the 24-gun ship Columbus. From February 17 to April 8, 1776, he commanded the ship during the first Continental Navy-Marine Corps amphibious expedition—the cruise to New Providence, in the Bahamas, to seize essential military supplies from the British garrison at Nassau.

After returning north to New England, Whipple captured five British prizes before March 27, 1778, when his ship ran aground off Point Judith, Rhode Island. After stripping the ship, the captain and his crew abandoned her and escaped capture ashore.

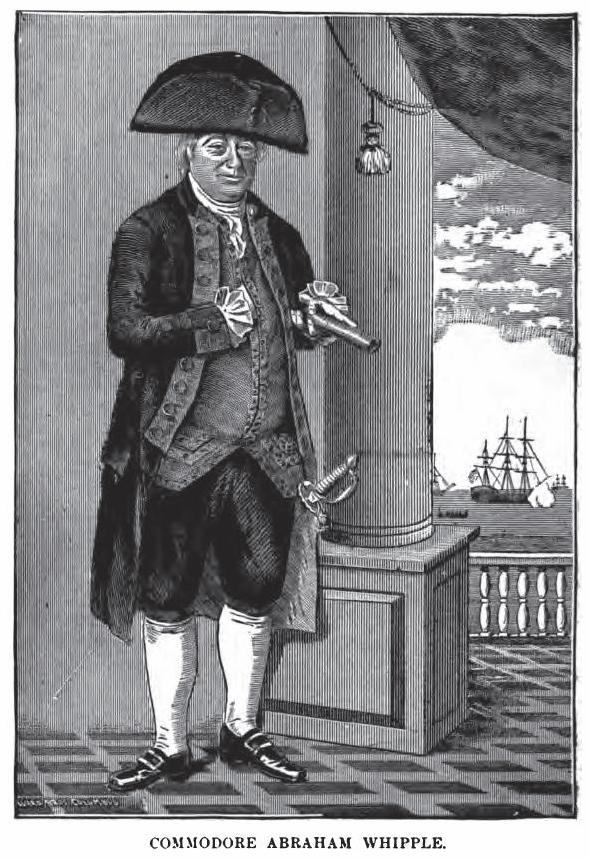
An 1895 lithograph print of Whipple

Assigned next to command the 28-gun frigate Providence, Whipple ran the British blockade on the night of April 30, 1778, damaging HMS Lark and outrunning another British ship during the escape. Tacking for France, Providence crossed the Atlantic Ocean unmolested, bearing important dispatches relating to agreements between France and the American colonies, and reached Paimboeuf. After acquiring guns and supplies for the Continental Army, Providence and Boston sailed home to the colonies, taking three prizes en route.

Upon his return, Whipple received command of a small squadron—Providence, Ranger, and Queen of France. On one occasion in mid-July 1779, this group of ships encountered a large British convoy in dense fog off the Newfoundland Banks. Whipple concealed his guns and ran up the British flag. Thus disguised, Whipple cut 11 prizes out of the convoy, eight of which contained spoils of war valued together at over one million dollars (roughly 25.7 million in 2024 dollars), making the venture easily one of the richest captures of the entire war.

Whipple then cruised off Bermuda before arriving at Charleston, South Carolina. On December 23, 1779. British forces threatened Charleston, which was at the time a key Continental port. The threat led Whipple to move the guns and crews from the Continental Navy ships in port ashore to reinforce the land batteries and repulse the expected British assault.

However, after a rugged four-month siege, the overwhelming pressure of British arms forced the Continental forces to surrender on May 12, 1780. Whipple remained a prisoner of war of the British until he was paroled to Chester, Pennsylvania, at which point he took no further part in the war. Upon the conclusion of hostilities, Whipple took up farming near Cranston, Rhode Island, then later moved to Ohio.

== Later life ==
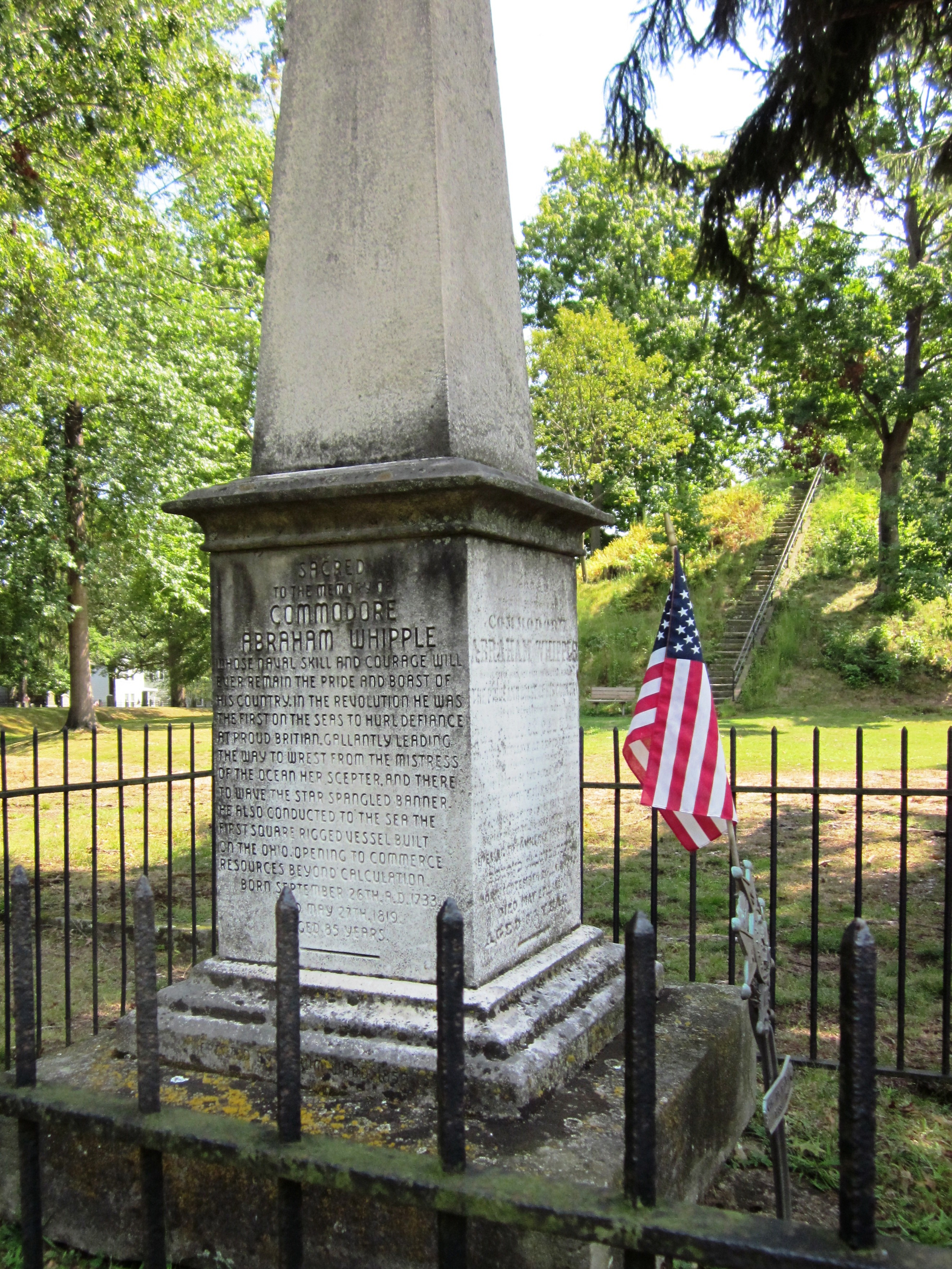
Abraham Whipple marker at Mound Cemetery, Marietta, Ohio

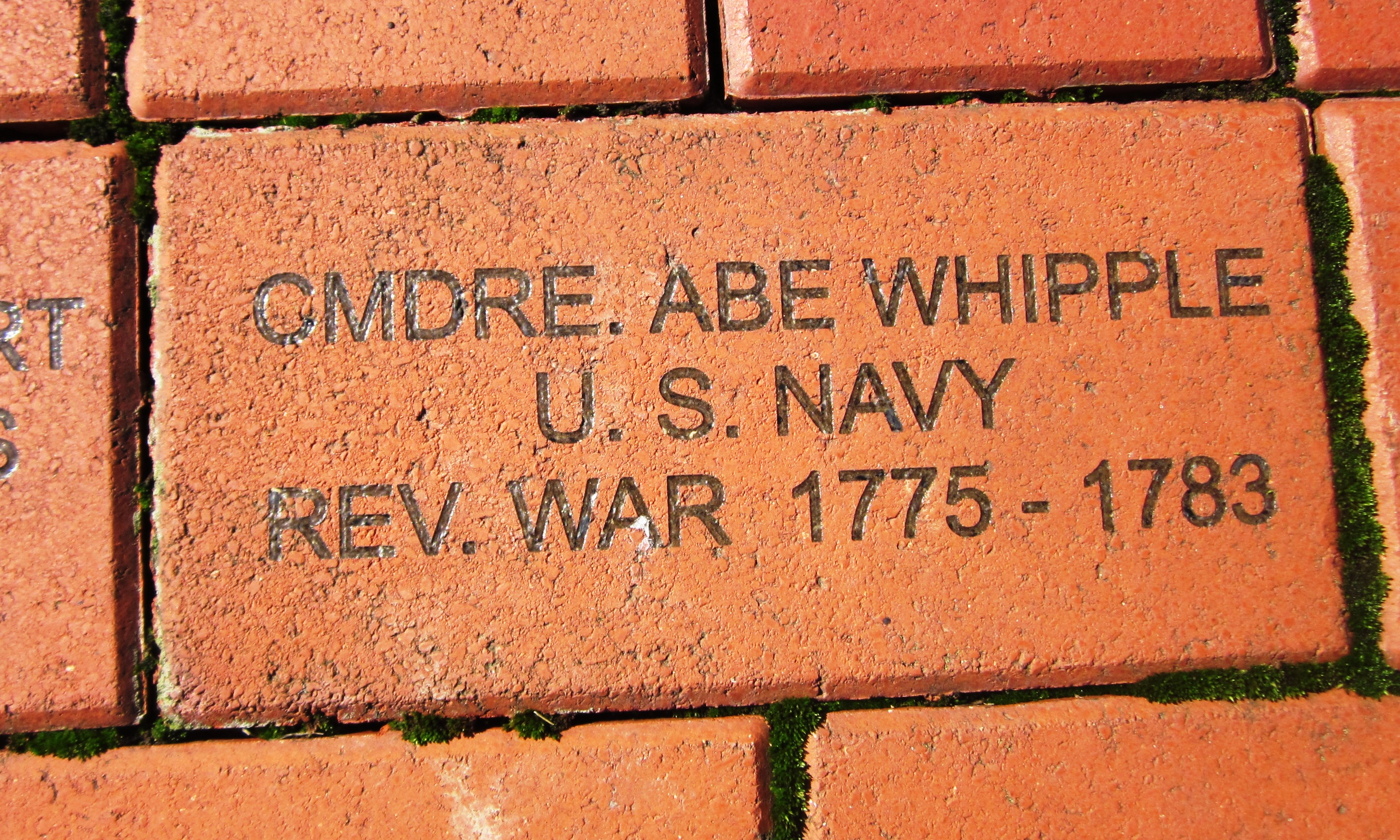
Abraham Whipple brick on the Veterans Walk of Honor in Marietta, Ohio

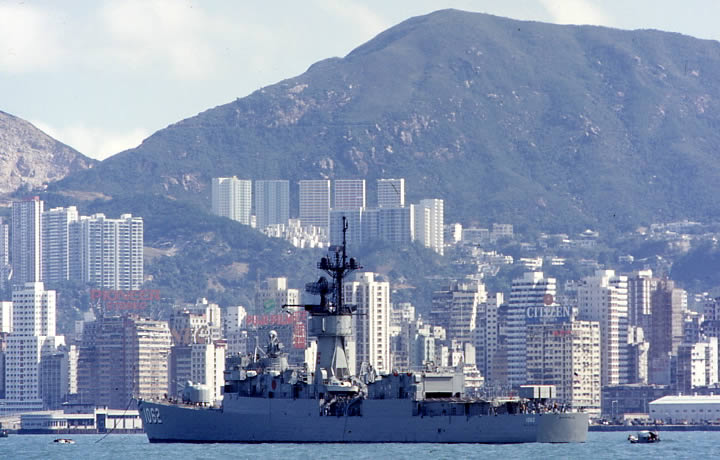
USS Whipple (FF-1062) in Hong Kong harbor, December 1974

For the rest of his life, he remained a farmer, with the exception of two spells of seafaring as master of merchantmen, first of General Washington and then of St. Clair. With the formation of the Ohio Company of Associates in 1788 and the initial westward migration into that territory, Whipple and his family became pioneers on the American frontier and were among the founders of the town of Marietta, Ohio, and the first named proprietor of Charleston, Vermont.

In 1801, Whipple became the first to sail a merchant ship that was built on the Ohio River down the Mississippi to New Orleans and then to Cuba. This was the initiation of a profitable trade route directly from the Ohio valley to the rest of the world.

Granted a pension by Congress in recognition of his distinguished service in helping to win American independence, Whipple died at Marietta, Ohio, on May 27, 1819, and was buried at Mound Cemetery in Marietta. His gravestone reads:

Sacred to the memory of Commodore Abraham Whipple whose naval skill and courage will ever remain the pride and boast of his country. In the revolution he was the first on the seas to hurl defiance at proud Britain, gallantly leading the way to wrest from the mistress of the ocean her scepter, and there to wave the star spangled banner. He also conducted to the sea the first square rigged vessel built on the Ohio, opening to commerce resources beyond calculation. Born September 26th, A.D. 1733. Died May 27th, 1819. Aged 85 years.

Several ships of the United States Navy have been named USS Whipple in his honor. There is a Whipple Street, Avenue or Court in almost every one of the 39 municipalities in the State of Rhode Island.

== In fiction ==
In The Case of Charles Dexter Ward by H.P. Lovecraft, Capt. Abraham Whipple, one of the "eminent townsmen" of Providence, Rhode Island, leads the raid on Joseph Curwen's farm. He is also mentioned in "The Shunned House" as a cousin of the narrator's great-grandfather. Whipple was an indirect ancestor of Lovecraft's, through his grandfather Whipple Van Buren Phillips.

== Bibliography ==
- Cohen, Sheldon S.: Commodore Abraham Whipple of the Continental Navy: Privateer, Patriot, Pioneer, University Press of Florida, Series: New Perspectives on Maritime History and Nautical Archaeology, Gainesville, Florida (2010). ISBN 978-0813034331, OCLC 421147591
- Hildreth, S. P.: Biographical and Historical Memoirs of the Early Pioneer Settlers of Ohio, H. W. Derby and Co., Cincinnati, Ohio (1852). OCLC 2642704
