= USS Hampden =

History

United States
- Name: USS Hampden
- Acquired: 27 June 1776
- Commissioned: 27 June 1776
- Out of service: 1777
- Homeport: New Haven, Connecticut
- Fate: Sold after running ashore, 1777

General characteristics
- Type: Brigantine
- Armament: 14 guns

Service record

USS Hampden was a 14-gun brigantine of the Continental Navy. She was originally a trading ship out of Hispaniola that carried military supplies to the United Colonies and avoided capture by HMS Cerberus thanks to the assistance of John Paul Jones, then in command of USS Providence. She was later purchased by the Continental Congress and refitted for service in New Haven, Connecticut, for the Continental Navy.

Congress originally appointed Jones to take command of Hampden, yet feeling that the ship was inferior to Providence he chose not to change command. The ship instead was given to Captain Hoysted Hacker, who up to that point had been in command of the much smaller USS Fly. Records indicate that Hacker sailed into New Haven on board Fly on 26 June 1776 in company with Biddle and was in command of Hampden on 27 June.

While many sources claim that she retained her name from merchant service, there does not appear to be any records of a merchantman with that name in the area at that time. It is possible that she was originally the brig Catharine which Congress ordered purchased on 26 June 1776. Her name may be a reference to John Hampden, who had been a Member of Parliament during the English Civil War and is credited with coining the term "Glorious Revolution".

DANFS reports that Captain Hacker sailed for Providence, Rhode Island, to join USS Alfred in September 1776. However, due to the inability to recruit a full crew and supply both vessels, the ships did not depart until 27 October 1776 on a mission to harass Newfoundland fisheries and to attempt the liberation of American prisoners of war on Cape Breton Island. Soon after getting underway, however, Hampden grounded on a ledge, was considerably damaged, and could not continue. Captain Hacker and his crew transferred to the sloop Providence and continued the cruise, while Hampden returned to Providence. She was sold out of the service in late 1777 at Providence.
