= USS Whipple (FF-1062) =

Knox-class frigate

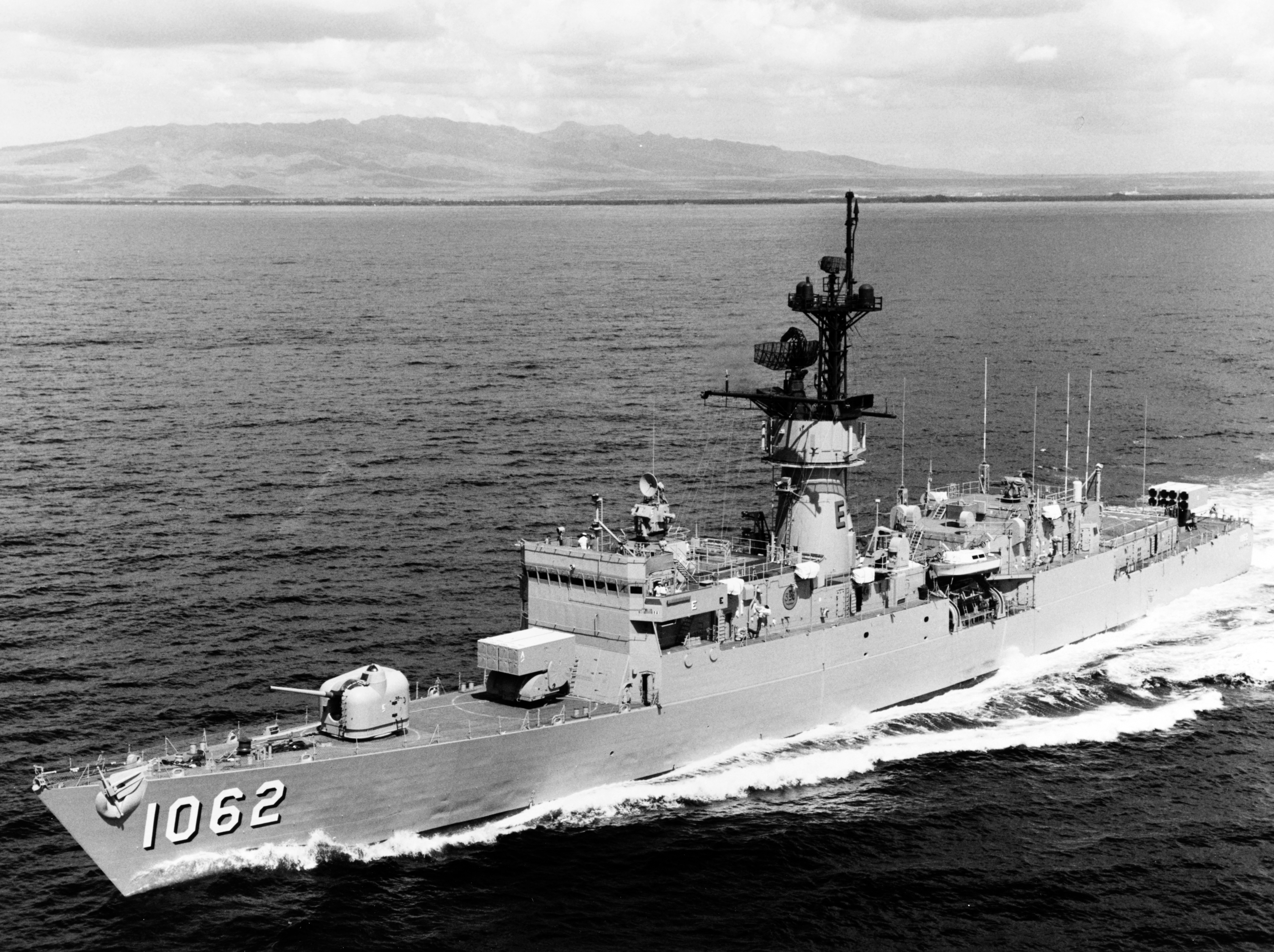
- USS Whipple in 1974

History

United States
- Name: Whipple
- Namesake: Abraham Whipple
- Ordered: 22 July 1964
- Builder: Todd Pacific Shipyards, Seattle, Washington
- Laid down: 24 April 1967
- Launched: 12 April 1968
- Acquired: 13 August 1970
- Commissioned: 22 August 1970
- Decommissioned: 14 February 1992
- Stricken: 11 January 1995
- Identification: FF-1062
- Motto: Resources Beyond Calculation
- Fate: Transferred to Mexico 10 April 2002
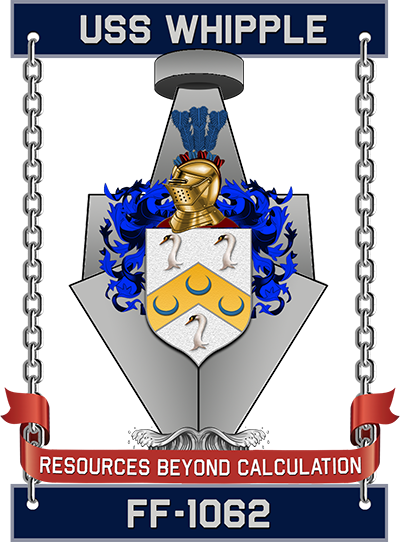
- Badge

Mexico
- Name: Mina
- Namesake: Martín Francisco Javier Mina y Larrea
- Acquired: 10 April 2002
- Decommissioned: 2016
- Identification: F-214
- Status: Awaiting disposal

General characteristics
- Class & type: Knox-class frigate
- Displacement: 3,159 tons (4,122 full load)
- Length: 438 ft (134 m)
- Beam: 46 ft 9 in (14.25 m)
- Draft: 24 ft 9 in (7.54 m)
- Propulsion: 2 × CE 1200psi boilers; 1 Westinghouse geared turbine; 1 shaft, 35,000 shp (26,000 kW)
- Speed: over 27 knots (50 km/h)
- Range: 4,500 nautical miles (8,330 km) at 20 knots (37 km/h)
- Complement: 18 officers, 267 enlisted
- Sensors & processing systems: AN/SPS-40 Air Search Radar; AN/SPS-67 Surface Search Radar; AN/SQS-26 Sonar; AN/SQR-18 Towed array sonar system; Mk68 Gun Fire Control System
- Electronic warfare & decoys: AN/SLQ-32 Electronics Warfare System
- Armament: one Mk-16 8 cell missile launcher for ASROC and Harpoon missiles; one Mk-42 5-inch/54 caliber gun; Mark 46 torpedoes from four single tube launchers); one Mk-25 BPDMS launcher for Sea Sparrow missiles, later replaced by one Phalanx CIWS
- Aircraft carried: one SH-2 Seasprite (LAMPS I) helicopter

USS Whipple (DE-1062/FF-1062) was a Knox-class frigate commissioned in the United States Navy from 1970 to 1995. In 2002, Whipple was donated to the Mexican Navy and renamed ARM Mina (F-214).

== Construction ==
Whipple was the third ship of the United States Navy named in honor of Captain Abraham Whipple (1733–1819), who served in the Continental Navy. She was laid down on 24 April 1967 at Seattle, Washington, by the Todd Shipyards Corporation; launched on 12 April 1968; sponsored by Mrs. Kirkland B. Alexander; and commissioned on 22 August 1970.

Whipple conducted sea trials from 24 to 26 September before returning to the Puget Sound Navy Yard, Bremerton, Washington, for fitting-out availability from 27 to 30 September. On 1 October, the escort ship proceeded to Nanoose Bay, British Columbia, for a visit prior to further trials at Carr Inlet, Washington.

== Operational history ==
=== 1970–1972 ===
On 9 October, the ship got underway for San Diego and made port four days later. Whipple departed the west coast on 16 October, bound for her new home port, Pearl Harbor, and duty with the Cruiser-Destroyer Force, Pacific Fleet. Soon after her arrival on 22 October, she commenced local operations in the Hawaiian area which lasted until 20 November when she tied up alongside tender Bryce Canyon for availability which ran until 4 December.

Five days later, while engaged in local operations, the destroyer escort investigated an unidentified submarine contact off the Barking Sands Missile Test Range, Kauai. Following that hunt, Whipple resumed local cruising through 20 December. Returning to her home port the following day, the escort ship commenced a holiday upkeep period which lasted through 13 January 1971. She then conducted weapons trials off Hawaii before undergoing preshake-down tests.

On 8 February, Whipple commenced shakedown which included underway training exercises and the ship's first battle problem. Termination of the shakedown period on 19 March was soon followed by availability at the Pearl Harbor Naval Shipyard. On 1 April—while undergoing yard work which lasted into July—the escort ship was assigned to newly formed Destroyer Squadron (DesRon) 33.

After sea trials in late August, the ship commenced weapons trials. From 4 to 10 October, the ship performed plane-guard duties for the aircraft carrier Constellation, while additionally conducting antiaircraft and surface gunnery exercises. A dependents' cruise to Lahaina, a Navy Day "open house," and host-ship duties to Australian destroyer HMAS Hobart occupied Whipple through 25 October, after which time she conducted further trials and gunnery shoots.

Whipple underwent upkeep for the first four days of November before she got underway on 5 November for the filming of the at-sea phase of a Hawaii Five-O television episode. From 8 to 18 November, Whipple participated in SEATO exercise RIMPAC-4, conducting antisubmarine warfare exercises in company with Australian, New Zealand, Canadian, Japanese, and American units.

Following her return to Hawaiian waters, Whipple conducted further trials and began preparations for a Western Pacific (WestPac) deployment. On 27 January 1972, Whipple departed Pearl Harbor in company with the rest of DesRon 33 and proceeded via Midway and Guam to the Philippines. The ship's subsequent Manila stopover, where she made port on 13 February, coincided with the initial work-up phase for SEATO exercise "Seahawk." Naval forces of the United Kingdom, Australia, New Zealand, the Philippines, and Thailand, as well as the United States, participated in these exercises. Accordingly, Whipple, in company with Australian carrier HMAS Melbourne, took part in the simulated convoy escort operation.

Upon detachment from "Seahawk," Whipple stopped at Subic Bay for maintenance prior to proceeding to the Gulf of Tonkin to relieve the destroyer Higbee as Positive Identification and Radar Advisory Zone (PIRAZ) ship. After taking up station on 28 February, Whipple performed escort duties besides conducting her regular patrols. Her PIRAZ work during this time was light, as reduced air activity over North Vietnam was accomplished by low visibility and a cancellation of many scheduled flights. While Whipple operated in company with the destroyer Parsons on PIRAZ duties, the escort ship's electronic "eyes" maintained the air "picture" for the northern half of the Gulf of Tonkin. The destroyer escort next took up plane-guard duties for the carrier Hancock before providing gunfire support in Military Region 1 for the South Vietnamese Army's 3d Division. Whipple conducted 52 missions and expended 2,361 rounds of 5-inch ammunition.

Night harassment and interdiction fire against unobserved area targets comprised the majority of the missions. On some occasions, Whipple operated in conjunction with aerial spotters who directed the destroyer escort's fire on enemy troop movements, coastal defense guns, artillery sites, and tanks. During Whipple's first gunfire support assignment on 11 April, the ship twice dueled enemy shore guns, with enemy shells impacting within 150 and 200 yards (200 m) of the ship. For this action, Whipple received the Combat Action Ribbon.

From 20 to 24 April, Whipple received repairs to her 5-inch (127 mm) gun from the repair ship Hector and Mobile Technical Unit 13. Moored alongside the repair ship in Danang harbor in the daytime, the ship would patrol off the harbor mouth in the evening. Upon completion of gun repairs, the escort ship joined Tripoli for "Freedom Porch" strikes.

After a brief period planeguarding on "Dixie" and "Yankee" stations for Hancock, Whipple received a needed upkeep at Danang from 3 to 10 May while the destroyer tender Piedmont replaced the escort's 5-inch (127 mm) gun. She then returned to "Yankee" Station where she once more operated with Hancock, conducting escort and plane-guarding operations through June.

Following availability at Subic Bay and a visit to Hong Kong, Whipple returned to the line and provided gunfire support in the vicinity of Point "Claudia" for the Republic of Vietnam's 1st and 3d Divisions. From 17 to 25 June, she fired harassment and interdiction missions at night and made runs during daylight hours in which she was aided by OV-1 Mohawks which pinpointed enemy bunker complexes, rocket sites, and supply routes. On 26 June, Whipple moved north to the vicinity of Point "Allison" to provide gunfire support for Operation LAM SON 72. Coastal defense sites in the Demilitarized Zone (DMZ) and point targets in the Cửa Việt River region felt the sting of salvos she fired in preparation for a South Vietnamese Marine Corps counter-offensive. Continuing to provide gunfire support for LAM SON 72, Whipple received a call for help at dusk on 5 July. Vietnamese marines—under heavy attack by tank-supported North Vietnamese Army infantry—radioed for immediate assistance. The escort ship—the first ship in the vicinity to do so—soon answered the call. Newport News (CA-148) subsequently opened fire with her 8-inch (203 mm) guns to parry the North Vietnamese thrust.

Whipple returned to planeguarding duties from 9 to 17 July—this time for Saratoga—and continued combat operations in the Gulf of Tonkin. Following this duty, the escort ship returned to Subic Bay on the 18th for upkeep which lasted until 27 July, when the ship departed Philippine waters, bound for Vietnam. En route, heavy seas damaged the fiberglass 5-inch (127 mm) gun shield, forcing a change of plans and a return to Subic Bay.

Following in-port repairs, Whipple joined Task Group (TG) 77.6—based around the carrier America—bound for Yankee Station. Upon relief by the destroyer James E. Kyes as screen commander, Whipple put about for the Philippines and joined her squadron mates for the homeward-bound voyage to Pearl Harbor. After stops en route at Guam and Midway for fuel, the destroyer escort made port at Pearl Harbor on 25 August. Underway training, convoy and antisubmarine warfare exercises, and testing of the ship's ASROC occupied Whipple during October. November and December saw the ship undergo restricted availability at the Pearl Harbor Naval Shipyard.

=== 1973–1977 ===
Whipple conducted post-availability shakedown in January 1973 and commenced a period of routine training and exercises which continued until 14 May when the destroyer escort departed Pearl Harbor for her second WestPac deployment. She proceeded to Japan and arrived at Yokosuka on 24 May. Two days later, Whipple sailed for Taiwan and arrived there on 30 May. Availability alongside tender Prairie preceded the escort ship's deployment in Vietnamese waters, and she departed Taiwan on 5 June, bound for "Yankee Station."

Deployed as picket-escort from 8 to 30 June in the Gulf of Tonkin, Whipple returned to Subic Bay for repairs to her rudder. The destroyer escort conducted sea trials before once more returning to "Yankee Station" as an escort for the carrier Coral Sea.

Whipple visited Hong Kong from 1 to 8 August and screened Coral Sea back to Subic Bay before returning to Tonkin Gulf for picket-escort and PIRAZ duties. This line deployment concluded on 6 September when the vessel departed for upkeep at Singapore.

Following her return to the Philippines, the ship took part in Amphibious Exercise PEGASA II, off Mindoro. At its conclusion on 2 October, Whipple headed toward "Yankee Station" for another deployment as picket. During that assignment, typhoons Nora and Opal swirled through the Tonkin Gulf giving Whipple plenty of experience in storm evasion.

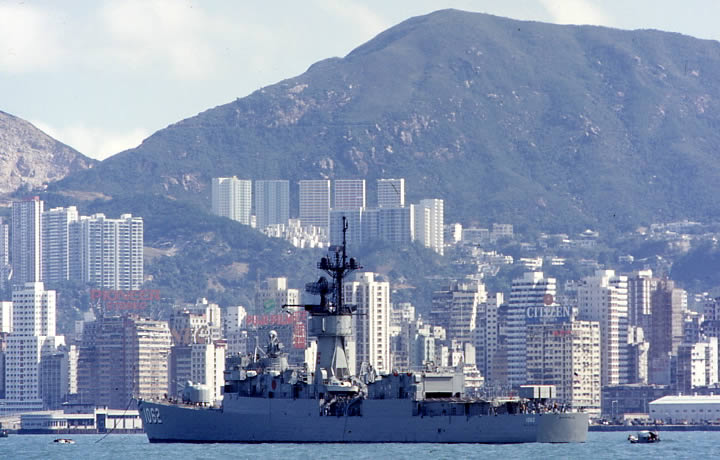
Whipple in Hong Kong, December 1974.

Following a return to Subic Bay for upkeep, Whipple made a 21-day, round-trip voyage to Colombo, Sri Lanka, to "show the flag." On the passage to Colombo, she carried several tons of bulk foodstuffs and miscellaneous supplies for the small American community in Sri Lanka. Once the escort ship arrived at Colombo, she served as central mailing point for Christmas packages from the Americans there to friends and relatives in the United States and elsewhere. After departing Sri Lanka on 31 October, Whipple proceeded to the Philippines and arrived at Subic Bay on 8 November to prepare for a voyage home. She got underway on 20 November; made brief stops at Guam and Midway for refueling; and, in company with her squadron mates, steamed single-file into Pearl Harbor on 7 December. The destroyer escort spent the remainder of the year 1973 in a leave and upkeep stand-down period. Whipple resumed local operations out of Pearl Harbor and engaged in routine exercises, inspections, and maneuvers through August. Early in September 1974, the ship commenced preparations for her third WestPac deployment and, on 1 October, got underway for Subic Bay.

Arriving on 16 October, the destroyer escort conducted type training exercises in the Philippines from 23 to 26 October before receiving orders to make for Ambon, Indonesia, for a "showing-the-flag" and goodwill mission (U.S. Navy Project Handclasp). On 27 October, the ship departed Subic and headed south in the teeth of a typhoon. Upon making port at Ambon on the morning of 1 November, Whipple began carrying out the diplomacy of a goodwill visit. Her crew distributed "Project-Handclasp" material, painted a school, and topped off her visit with an unusual and time-consuming refuelling operation—a three-day, round-the-clock affair—utilizing tanker trucks. Underway again on 4 November, Whipple made for Subic Bay once more. After arriving at the Philippine base on 8 November, the destroyer escort commenced restricted availability which lasted until 16 November when the ship sailed for Kaohsiung, Taiwan.

Whipple undertook ASW operations out of Kaohsiung before proceeding via Subic Bay to Hong Kong. The escort ship arrived at the British Crown Colony on 2 December before once more heading for Philippine waters where she remained for the remainder of the year 1974. After celebrating New Year's 1975 at Subic Bay, Whipple proceeded to Buckner Bay, Okinawa, for local operations which lasted through 10 January. Upon reaching Philippine waters three days later, Whipple joined Task Group 77.5, consisting of Coral Sea, Knox, and Gridley, in local Philippine operating areas.

Detached from TG 77.5 on 27 January, Whipple conducted ASW exercises with Reasoner before rejoining Coral Sea and planeguarding and steaming in company with the carrier through 2 February. After one week in port, Whipple steamed out of Subic Bay on 9 February, bound for Pearl Harbor. Resuming local operations in the Hawaiian area after her return on 22 February, Whipple conducted routine exercises and maneuvers through the summer of the year. On 1 July 1975, Whipple's designation was changed to FF-1062 during a Navy-wide reclassification. On August, Whipple entered Drydock No. 4 at the Pearl Harbor Naval Shipyard for a major overhaul which was to include reconfiguring her superstructure to accommodate a LAMPS system.

Whipple completed overhaul on 24 March 1976. The ensuing months were spent in refresher training in the Hawaiian area where the ship obtained certification over the full range of her weapons and propulsion systems. The period October to December was spent in preparation for a forthcoming deployment to the western Pacific. On 3 January 1977, Whipple departed on her fourth deployment since commissioning. From that date until her return to Pearl Harbor, the frigate operated as a part of the 7th Fleet in various advanced exercises. Following post-deployment standdown, Whipple resumed training operations in the Hawaiian area until December when she entered the Pearl Harbor Naval Shipyard for a restricted availability.

=== 1978–1995 ===
Completing her repair work on 3 February 1978, Whipple resumed the pattern of operations out of her home port which she had assumed following the previous deployment. On 3 April, the ship departed Hawaii for a four-nation naval exercise, "RIMPAC '78", which took place in the Central Pacific. She returned on 22 April. Further exercises followed as the ship prepared for another extended deployment to the western Pacific. Whipple departed Pearl Harbor on 24 June (HSL-37 Detachment 1 embarked). During the period 5 to 10 July, Whipple made the first visit to Guadalcanal, Solomon Islands, by a United States Navy ship since 1957. For most of the remainder of the year, the ship operated with the 7th Fleet throughout the reaches of the western Pacific. On 22 August 1978, the crew of Whipple rescued 410 Vietnamese refugees from a rickety 60 feet (18 m) boat in a storm-tossed South China Sea. The rescue was performed without any injuries more serious than bruises. Of these 410, half were under the age of 16. As Whipple turned and dipped into the seas for Hong Kong, one of the English-speaking refugees sloshed through the radar room with an escort to the bridge for an interview with the captain. "After 3 days of hiding in the woods near Vung-Tao, four stormy days at sea, and growing cracks in the hull, they were waiting to die. In addition, not one of these individuals was a mariner. No one knew how to properly sail a vessel."

Two days later, Whipple entered Junk Bay, Hong Kong, and transferred the refugees to the U.N. High Commission for refugees. The incident attracted international attention. Whipple returned to Pearl Harbor on 15 December having met all operational commitments during her deployment. Whipple received two battle stars for service in Vietnam.

=== 1998 Movie cameo ===
In the summer of 1998, while undergoing the decommissioning process, Whipple remained anchored at Pearl Harbor awaiting her outbound transfer to the inactive fleet. During this time, she briefly took part in the filming of the motion picture Pearl Harbor by Michael Bay, in which she can be seen in various shots throughout the harbor air bombing scenes.

=== Transfer to Mexico ===
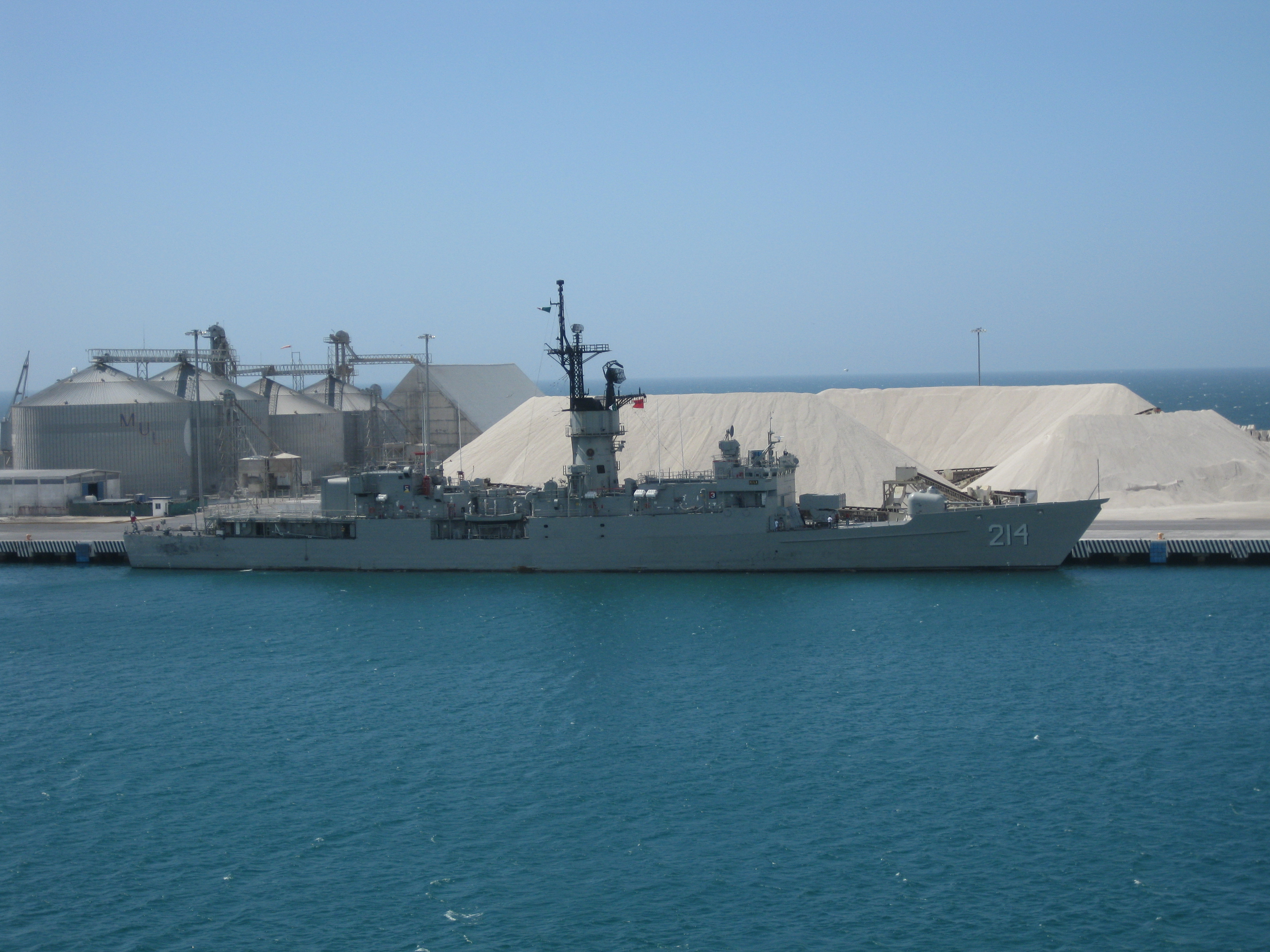
ARM Mina in 2009.

Whipple was decommissioned on 14 February 1992 and struck from the Naval Vessel Register on 11 January 1995. She was subsequently donated to the Mexican Navy and renamed ARM Mina (F-214).
