= USS Columbus (1774) =

Ship in the Continental Navy

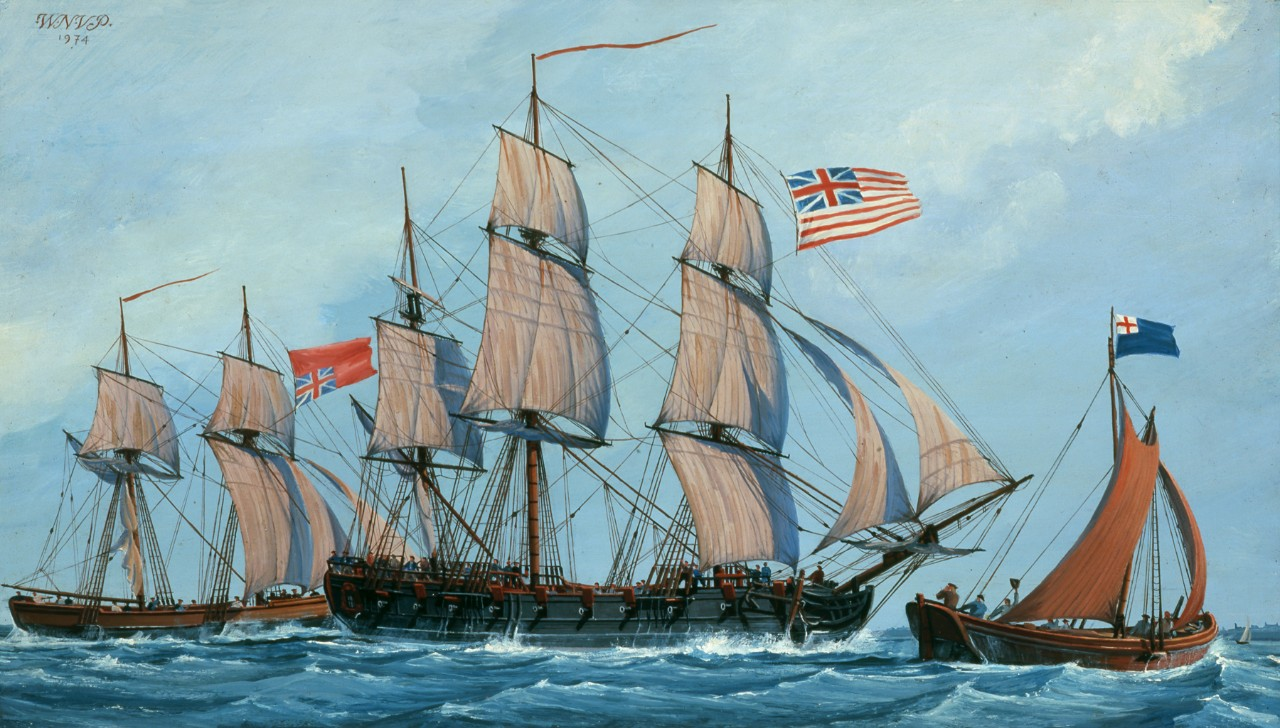
- Columbus (center) with the captured British brig Lord Lifford (left) off New England, 1776

History

United States
- Name: USS Columbus
- Laid down: 1774
- Acquired: November 1775
- Fate: Destroyed on 27 March 1778

General characteristics
- Type: Frigate
- Displacement: 200 long tons (203 t)
- Complement: 220 officers and men
- Armament: 18 × 9-pounder (4 kg) guns; 10 × 6-pounder (2.7 kg) guns

Service record
- Commanders: Capt. Abraham Whipple
- Operations: Battle of Nassau; Action of 6 April 1776

USS Columbus was a 28-gun frigate of the Continental Navy. Built as a merchant ship at Philadelphia in 1774 as Sally, she was purchased from Willing, Morris & Co., for the Continental Navy in November 1775, Captain Abraham Whipple was given command.

Between 17 February and 8 April 1776, in company with the other ships of Commodore Esek Hopkins' squadron, Columbus took part in the expedition to New Providence, Bahamas, where the first Navy-Marine amphibious operation seized essential military supplies. On the return passage, the squadron captured the British schooner, Hawk, on 4 April, and brig Bolton on the 5th. On 6 April the squadron engaged Glasgow. After three hours the action was broken off and Glasgow escaped, leaving her tender to be captured. Later in 1776 Columbus cruised off the New England coast taking five prizes.

Chased ashore on Point Judith, Rhode Island, 27 March 1778 by a British squadron, Columbus was stripped of her sails, most of her rigging, and other usable material by her crew before being abandoned. She was burned by the British.
