= HMS Glasgow (1757) =

British warship

History

Great Britain
- Name: Glasgow
- Ordered: 13 April 1756
- Builder: John Reed, Hull
- Laid down: 5 June 1756
- Launched: 31 August 1757
- Commissioned: March 1757
- Out of service: 1779
- Fate: Accidentally burned down off of Jamaica in 1779

General characteristics
- Class & type: 20-gun sixth rate
- Tons burthen: 451 bm
- Length: 109 ft 4 in (33.3 m) (gundeck); 91 ft 2 1/2 in (27.8 m) (keel)
- Beam: 30 ft 6 in (9.3 m)
- Depth of hold: 9 ft 7 1/2 in (2.9 m)
- Complement: 160 officers and men
- Armament: 20 × 9-pounder guns

HMS Glasgow was a 20-gun sixth-rate post ship of the Royal Navy. She was launched in 1757 and took part in the American Revolutionary War. She is most famous for her encounter with the maiden voyage of the Continental Navy at the Battle of Block Island on 6 April 1776.

== History ==
While under the command of Captain William Maltby, Glasgow ran aground on rocks at Cohasset, Massachusetts on 10 December 1774. She was then refloated and arrived in Boston on 15 December for repairs. Captain Maltby was then relieved of command at a court martial. In mid-January 1775, Vice Admiral Samuel Graves replaced Maltby with Tyringham Howe, who had been the captain of HMS Cruizer up until then.

On 6 April 1776, on the waters off of Block Island, Glasgow, under Captain Howe, encountered a squadron of eight converted Continental Navy warships led by the Navy's commander-in-chief, Commadore Esek Hopkins. After a two-hour engagement, she managed to escape. Glasgow was damaged but intact, with one dead and three wounded.

Under the command of Thomas Pasley, she captured the sloop Juliana on 1 April 1777, the sloop Unity on 2 April 1777, the sloop Betsy & Ann on 4 April, the sloop Volante on 5 April, the brig Aurora on 10 April, the sloop Sally on 16 April, the American privateer sloop Henry on 19 April, the schooner Providence on 2 May, the schooner Nancy probably in early May, the schooner Betsy on 27 June, the sloop Antonio on 21 July, and the sloop Rover on 24 July. She captured the sloop Tryall on 25 July. She captured schooner Betsy & Ann on 4 November, the brig Sally on 8 December, the sloop Defiance and schooner Success on 9 December, the brig Minerva on 19 December, and the schooner Happy Return on 22 December 1777. Captured ships listed with unknown dates include the brig Dolphin, the schooner Gen. Thompson and the sloop Industry.

On 28 February 1778, she captured the sloop Abigale five leagues (24 km) east-northeast of the Tiburon Peninsula. On 9 March 1778, she captured the schooner Nancy six leagues (29 km) off of Mayaguana in the Bahamas. She captured the sloop Lucy on 12 March off the southeast end of Mayaguana. She captured a prize in April 1778, but it sprang a leak and sank.

=== Fate ===
She later chased two large Continental frigates in the Caribbean before she was accidentally burned in Montego Bay, Jamaica in 1779.
