= John Paul Jones Cottage Museum =

Museum in Arbigland, Dumfries and Galloway, Scotland

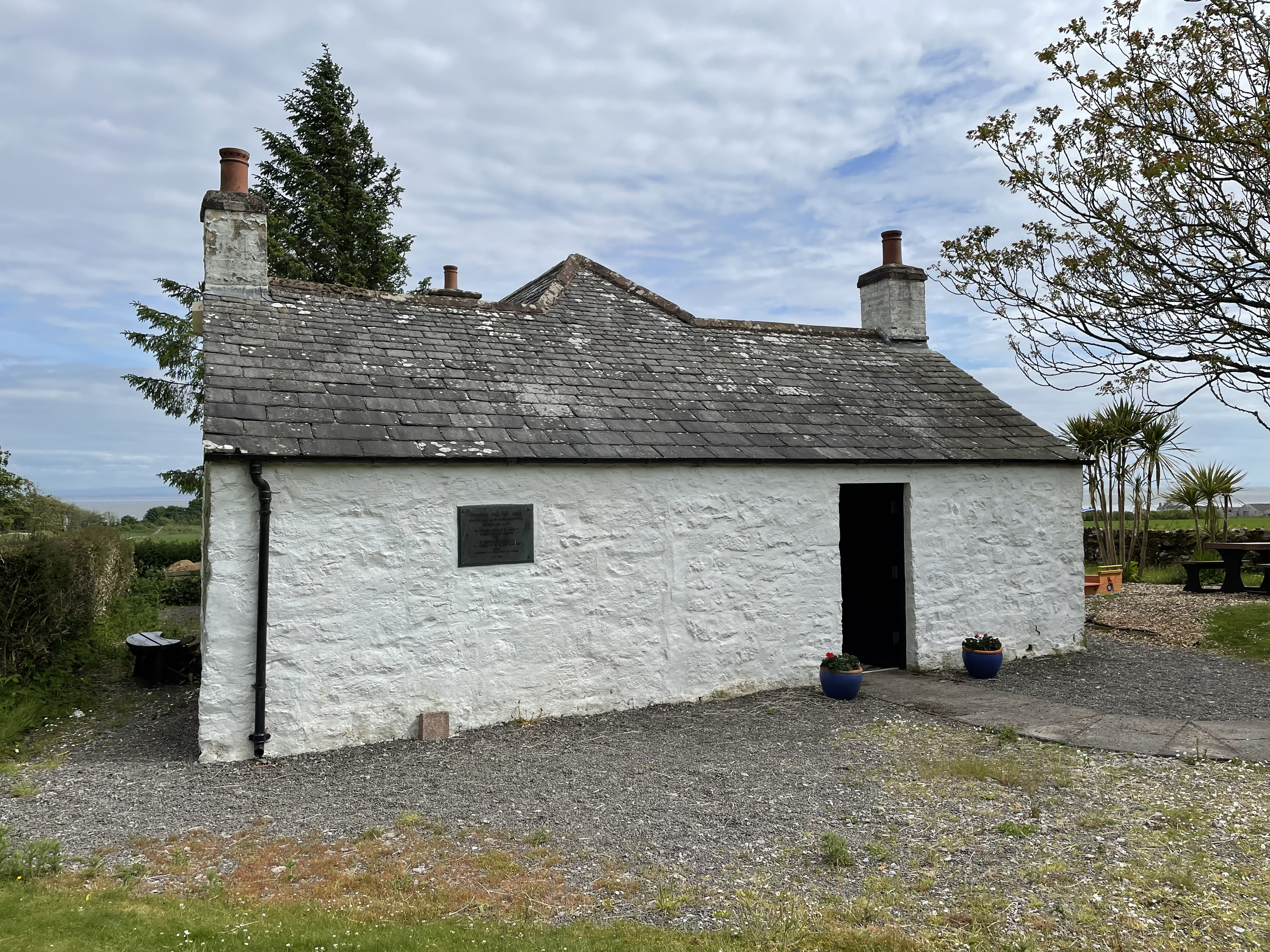
- Location: United Kingdom
- Coordinates: 54°53′56″N 3°34′50″W
- Type: independent museum
- Website: johnpauljonesmuseum.com
- Location of John Paul Jones Cottage Museum

The John Paul Jones Cottage Museum is located on the Arbigland Estate near Kirkbean in the historical county of Kirkcudbrightshire, Dumfries and Galloway, Scotland. The cottage is where John Paul Jones, hero of the American Revolutionary War and founder of the United States Navy, was born in 1747. Jones' father was a gardener for the estate.

Open from April through September, the cottage had been restored to appear as in 1747, and features audio presentations about life in the cottage. There is a reconstructed cabin of John Paul Jones' ship Bonhomme Richard, and exhibits about his defeat of HMS Serapis at the Battle of Flamborough Head in 1779. The visitor centre features video presentations and exhibits about his life and naval career.

Retired admirals Jerauld Wright and Sir Nigel Henderson, RN, spearheaded the effort to restore the Scottish birthplace of John Paul Jones back to its original 1747 condition. The museum opened in 1993.

== See also ==
- John Paul Jones House, in Portsmouth, New Hampshire, United States
