= Harvard Sitkoff =

American historian (born 1940)

Harvard Sitkoff (January 4, 1940 – January 9, 2025) was an American historian.

== Life ==
He lived in Durham, New Hampshire.

== Career ==
He was a professor emeritus of history at the University of New Hampshire. He contributed to the 1974 Encyclopedia of American Biography, most notably with an entry on Muhammad Ali, and also wrote on the politics of Martin Luther King Jr. Describing that period, Sitkoff called the summer of 1967 the "most intense and destructive wave of racial violence the nation had ever witnessed".

== Partial Bibliography ==
- The Struggle for Black Equality: 1954-1992
- King: Pilgrimage to the Mountaintop
- A New Deal for Blacks: The Emergence of Civil Rights as a National Issue: The Depression Decade
- The Struggle for Black Equality
- Perspectives on Modern America: Making Sense of the Twentieth Century
- Fifty Years Later: New Deal Evaluated
- Toward Freedom Land: The Long Struggle for Racial Equality in America
