= John Paul Jones =

Scottish-born American naval officer (1747–1792)

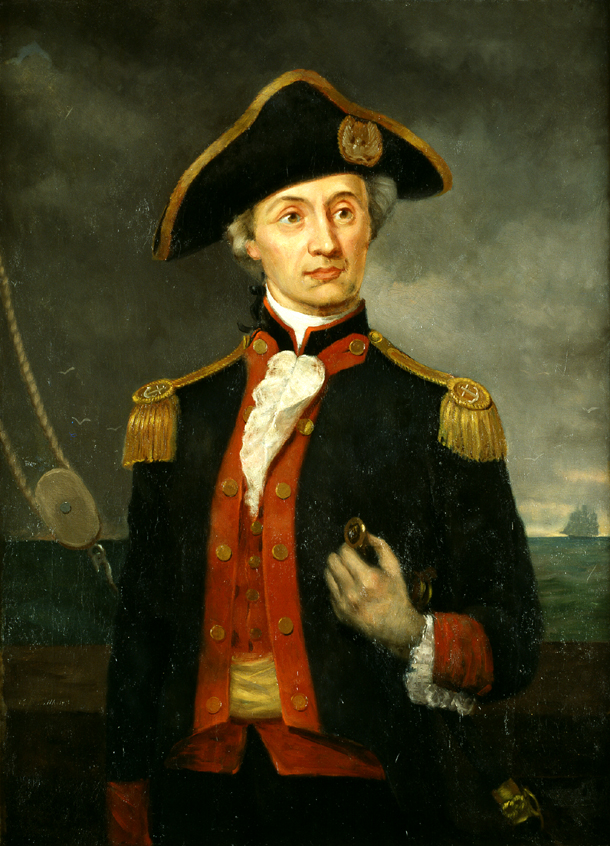
- Posthumous portrait, c. 1890, after contemporary portrait by Charles Willson Peale, c. 1781
- Born: John Paul; July 6, 1747; Arbigland, Kirkcudbrightshire, Scotland, Great Britain
- Died: July 18, 1792 (aged 45); Paris, France
- Burial place: Naval Academy Chapel, Annapolis, Maryland, U.S.
- Military career
- Allegiance: United States (1775–1787); Russian Empire (1787–1792)
- Branch: Continental Navy; Imperial Russian Navy
- Service years: 1775–1792
- Rank: Captain (Continental Navy); Rear Admiral (Imperial Russian Navy)
- Nickname: Father of the American Navy
- Conflicts: American Revolutionary War; Raid on Canso; Battle of Nassau; Battle of Block Island; North Channel Naval Duel; Battle of Flamborough Head; Russo-Turkish War; Naval actions at the Siege of Ochakov
- Awards: Order of Military Merit; Congressional Gold Medal; Order of Saint Anna

John Paul Jones (born John Paul; July 6, 1747 – July 18, 1792) was a British-American naval officer who served in the Continental Navy during the American Revolutionary War. Often referred to as the "Father of the American Navy", Jones is regarded by several commentators as one of the greatest naval commanders in the military history of the United States.

Born in Arbigland, Kirkcudbrightshire, Jones became a sailor at age 13 and served onboard several different merchantmen, including slave ships. After killing a mutinous subordinate, he fled to the British colony of Virginia to avoid being arrested and in c. 1775 joined the newly established Continental Navy. During the ensuing war with Great Britain, Jones participated in several naval engagements with the Royal Navy. He led a naval campaign in the Irish and North Seas, attacking British naval and merchant shipping, and other civilian targets. As part of the campaign, he raided the English town of Whitehaven, won the North Channel Naval Duel and fought the Battle of Flamborough Head, gaining him an international reputation.

Left without a command in 1787, Jones joined the Imperial Russian Navy and rose to the rank of rear admiral. However, after Jones was accused of raping a 10 year old girl, he was forced out of the Russian navy. A Freemason, Jones made many friends among U.S. political elites, including John Hancock, Thomas Jefferson, and Benjamin Franklin.

== Early life and training ==
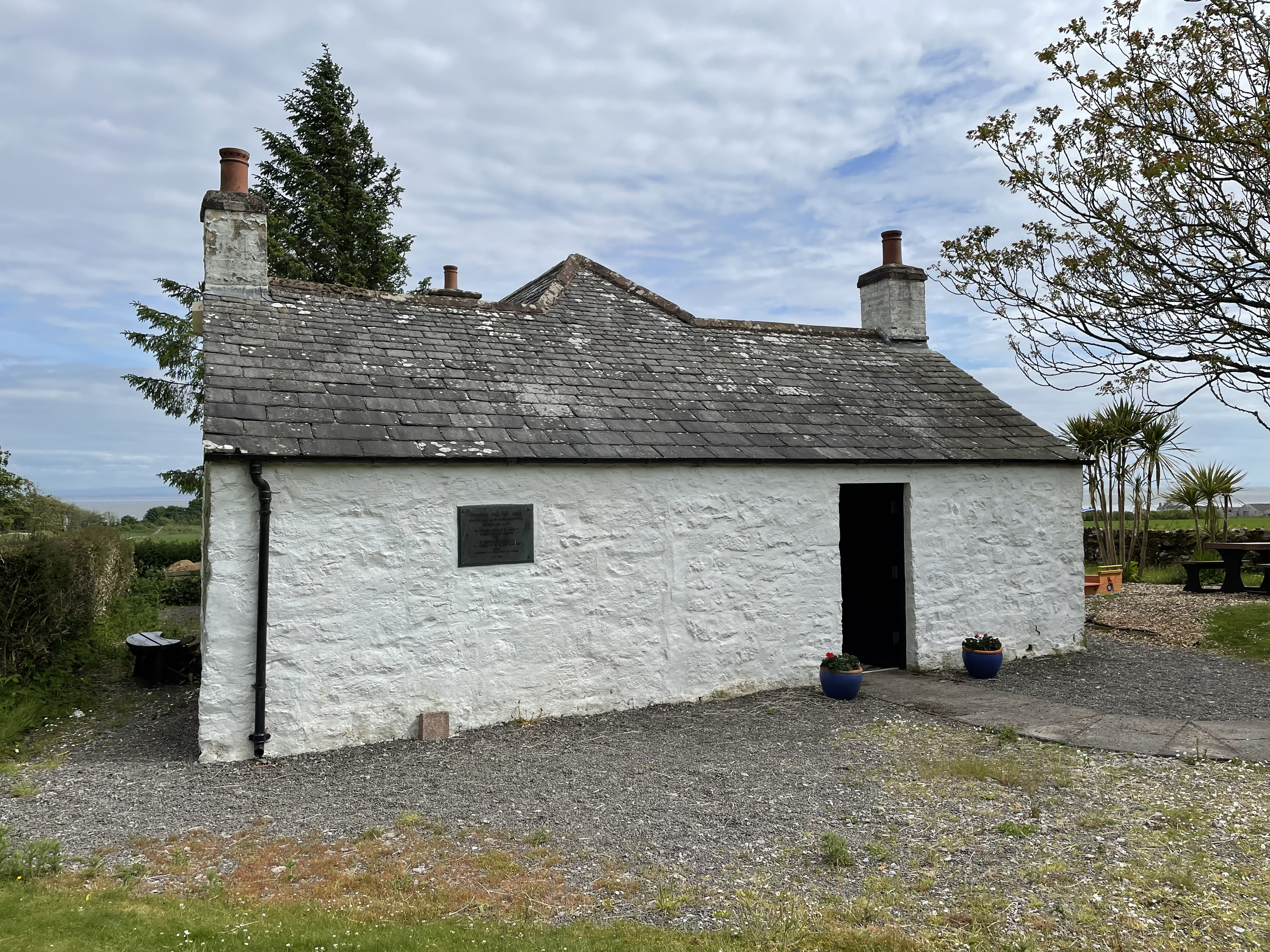
The birthplace and original home of John Paul Jones in Arbigland in southern Scotland

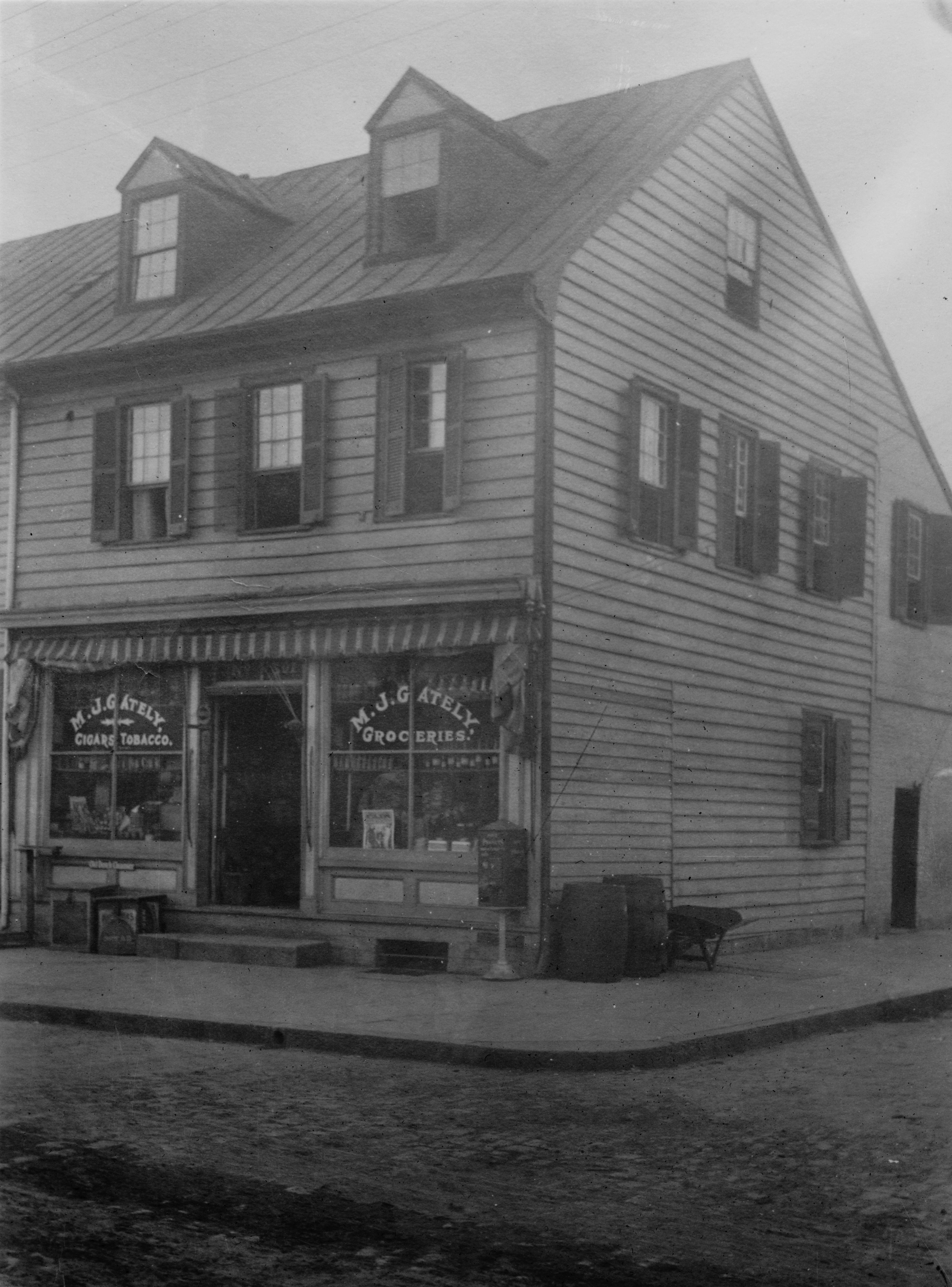
The "John Paul Jones House" in Fredericksburg, Virginia, a new building on the site of a house owned by his brother William Paul

John Paul, as he was then known, was born on the estate of Arbigland near Kirkbean in the Stewartry of Kirkcudbright on the southwest coast of Scotland. His parents had married on November 29, 1733, in New Abbey, Kirkcudbrightshire. John Paul started his maritime career when he was 13, sailing out of Whitehaven in the northern English county of Cumberland as an apprentice aboard Friendship under Captain Benson. Paul's older brother William Paul had married and settled in Fredericksburg, Colony of Virginia. Virginia was the destination of many of the younger Paul's voyages.

For several years, Paul worked as a sailor, sailing aboard several merchant ships. In 1764, he became involved in the Atlantic slave trade, serving as third mate onboard the slave ship King George; two years later, he transferred to the crew of Two Friends, a 50-foot slave ship which operated out of Kingston, Jamaica, as first mate. After completing several voyages to West Africa, Paul left the slave trade, which he described as an "abominable trade", in 1768. While Two Friends was docked in Kingston, Paul booked passage on a ship to Scotland.

Paul's career was quickly and unexpectedly advanced during his next voyage aboard the brig John, which sailed from port in 1768, when both the captain and a ranking mate suddenly died of yellow fever. With the crew encouraging and voting him to it, Paul managed to navigate the ship back to a safe port, and in reward for this feat, the vessel's grateful Scottish owners made him master of the ship and its crew, giving him 10% of the cargo. He led two voyages to the West Indies before running into difficulty.

During his second voyage in 1770, Paul had one of his crew flogged after a failed mutiny over early payment of wages, leading to accusations that his discipline was "unnecessarily cruel". These claims were initially dismissed, but his favorable reputation was destroyed when the sailor died a few weeks later. Paul was arrested for his involvement in the man's death. He was imprisoned in Kirkcudbright Tolbooth but later released on bail. The negative effect of this episode on his reputation is indisputable. The local governor encouraged Paul to leave the area and change his name while on bail. The man who died of his injuries was not a usual sailor but an adventurer from a very influential Scottish family.

Leaving Scotland, Paul commanded a London-registered vessel named Betsy, a West Indiaman mounting 22 guns, engaging in commercial speculation in Tobago for about 18 months. This came to an end, however, when he killed a mutinous crew member with a sword in a dispute over wages. Years later, in a letter to Benjamin Franklin describing the incident, Paul claimed that the killing was committed in self-defense, but he was not willing to wait to be tried in an Admiral's Court, which would have taken months to assemble and where the family of his first victim had been influential.

He felt compelled to flee. There is an 18-month gap in his history, and some biographers explore the possibility that he may have become a pirate in order to escape Tobago. Rumors of piracy followed him, but they may have been created by his detractors. He eventually reappeared in Fredericksburg, Virginia, leaving his fortune behind; he also sought to arrange the affairs of his brother, who had died there without leaving any immediate family. He was granted land in Frederick County, Virginia. About this time, he assumed the surname of Jones (in addition to his original surname). There is a long-held tradition in North Carolina that he adopted the name "Jones" in honor of Willie Jones of Halifax, North Carolina.

Jones courted Dorothea Spotswood Dandridge, the future bride of Patrick Henry, and made a valuable friendship with Dr. John K. Read during his time in Virginia.

== Naval career ==
=== American colonies ===
In the summer of 1775, Jones met Joseph Hewes and other revolutionary leaders in Philadelphia. From that period, America became "the country of his fond election", as he afterwards expressed himself to Baron Joan Derk van der Capellen tot den Pol. He was elected to the American Philosophical Society. He volunteered his services to the newly founded Continental Navy; during this time, the Navy and Marines were being formally established, and suitable ship officers and captains were in great demand. Jones's potential would likely have gone unrecognized were it not for the endorsement of Richard Henry Lee, who knew of his abilities. With help from influential members of the Continental Congress, Jones was appointed as a first lieutenant of the newly converted 24-gun frigate USS Alfred on December 7, 1775.

=== Revolutionary War command ===
==== Early command ====
Jones sailed from the Delaware River in February 1776 aboard Alfred on the Continental Navy's maiden cruise. It was aboard this vessel that Jones took the honour of hoisting the first U.S. ensign, the Continental Union Flag, over a naval vessel. The fleet had been expected to cruise along the coast but was ordered instead by Commodore Esek Hopkins to sail for The Bahamas, where Nassau was raided for military supplies. The fleet had an unsuccessful encounter with a British packet ship on their return voyage. Jones was then assigned command of the sloop USS Providence. Congress had recently ordered the construction of 13 frigates for the Navy, one of which was to be commanded by Jones. In exchange for this prestigious command, Jones accepted his commission aboard the smaller Providence. Over the summer of 1776, Jones performed various services for the Continental Navy and Congress. These services included the transport of troops, the movement of supplies, and the escort of convoys. Jones assisted a brig from Hispaniola that was being chased by HMS Cerberus and laden with military stores. The brig was then purchased by Congress and commissioned as USS Hampden. During a later six-week voyage to Nova Scotia, Jones captured 16 prizes and inflicted significant damage in the Raid on Canso.

Jones's next command came as a result of Commodore Hopkins's orders to liberate hundreds of American prisoners forced to labour in coal mines in Nova Scotia, and also to raid British shipping. On November 1, 1776, Jones set sail in command of Alfred to carry out this mission. Winter conditions prevented freeing the prisoners, but the mission resulted in the capture of Mellish, a vessel carrying a vital supply of winter clothing intended for General John Burgoyne's troops in Canada.

==== Command of Ranger ====
The coat of arms of John Paul Jones

Despite his successes at sea, Jones' disagreements with those in authority reached a new level upon arrival in Boston on December 16, 1776. While at port, he began feuding with Hopkins, as Jones believed that Hopkins was hindering his advancement by talking down his campaign plans. As a result of this and other frustrations, Jones was assigned the smaller command of the newly constructed USS Ranger on June 14, 1777.

After making the necessary preparations, Jones sailed for France on November 1 with orders to assist the American cause in any way possible. The American commissioners in France were Benjamin Franklin, Silas Deane, and Arthur Lee, and they listened to Jones's strategic recommendations. They promised him the command of Indien, a vessel being constructed for America by the Netherlands in Amsterdam. Britain, however, was able to divert Indien away from American hands by exerting pressure to ensure its sale to France instead (which had not yet allied with America). Jones was again left without a command. It is thought that during this time, Jones developed his close friendship with Franklin, whom he greatly admired.

On February 6, 1778, France signed the Treaty of Alliance with America, formally recognizing the independence of the new American republic. Eight days later, Captain Jones's Ranger became the first American naval vessel to be formally saluted by the French, with a nine-gun salute fired from Captain La Motte-Piquet's flagship. Jones writes of the event: "I accepted his offer all the more for after all it was a recognition of our independence and in the nation". On April 10, Jones set sail from Brest, France, for the western coasts of Great Britain.

==== Ranger attacks the British ====
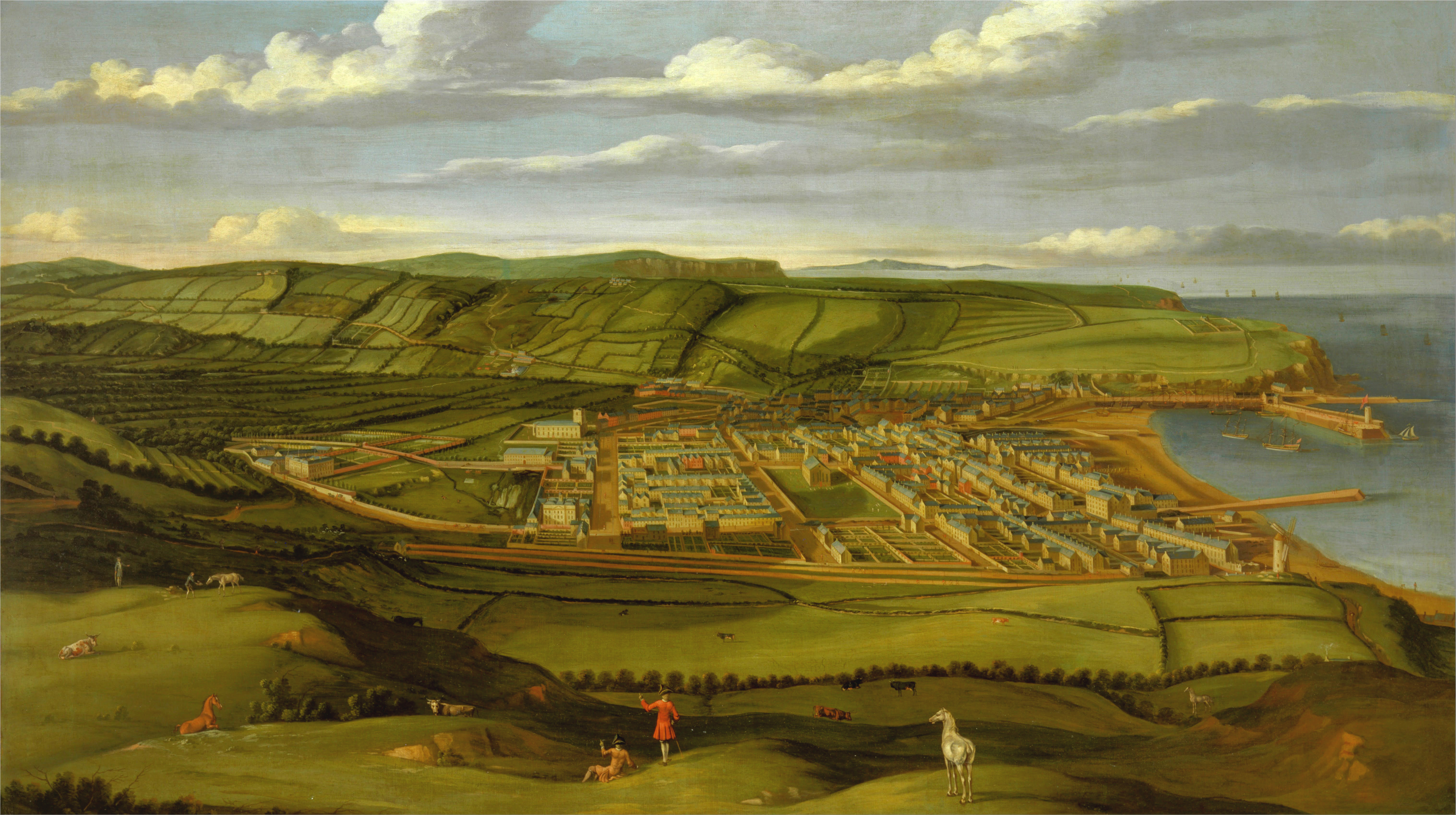
A portrait of Whitehaven, on the northwest coast of England, by Matthias Read completed between 1730 and 1735

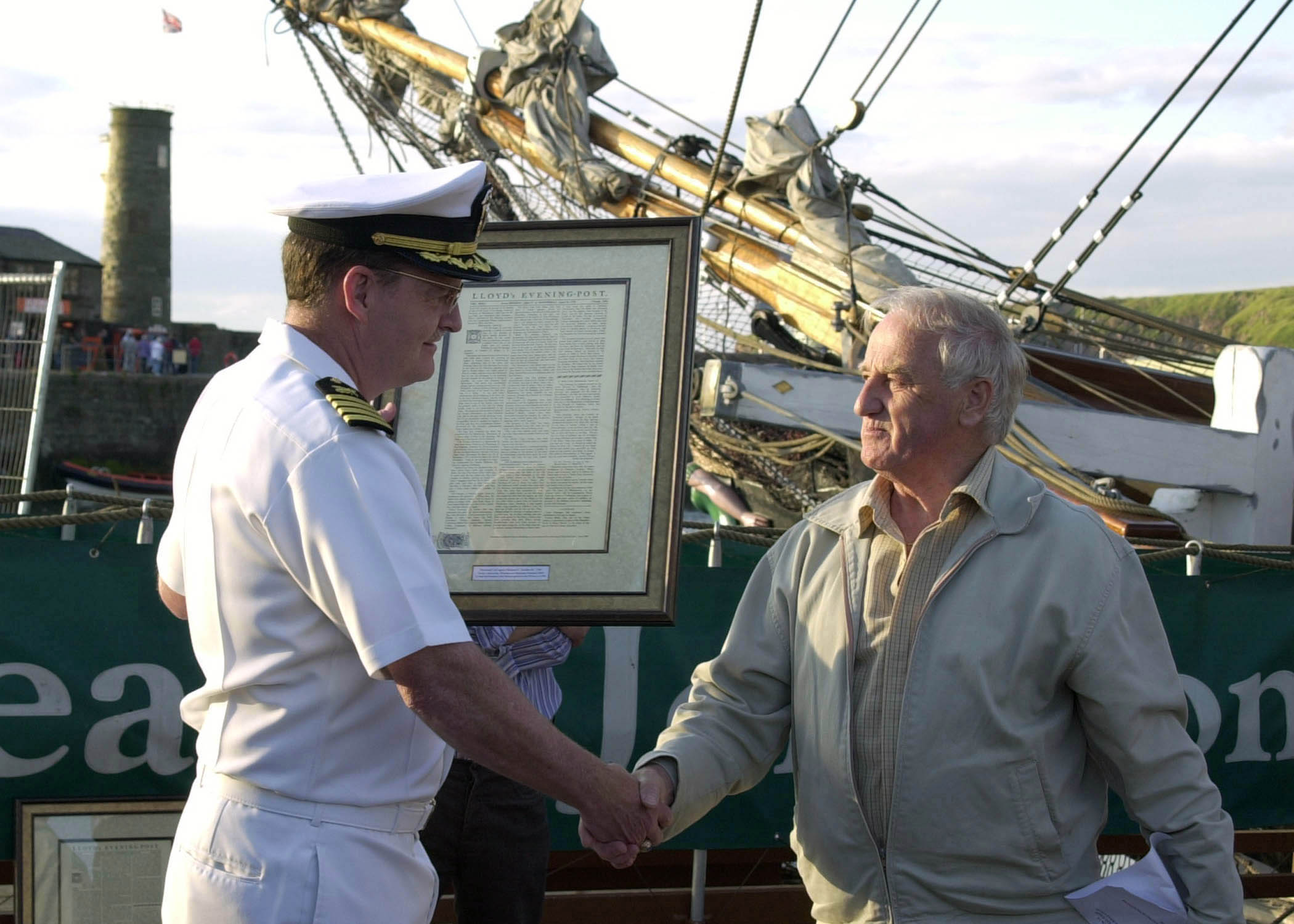
Captain Michael Gordon of the U.S. Navy receives a copy of the local newspaper from April 1778 from the Whitehaven Harbour Commission chairman in June 2005

Jones had some early successes against British merchant shipping in the Irish Sea. He persuaded his crew on April 17, 1778, to participate in an assault on Whitehaven, the town where his maritime career had begun. Jones later wrote about the poor command qualities of his senior officers (having tactfully avoided such matters in his official report): "'Their object', they said, 'was gain not honor'. They were poor: instead of encouraging the morale of the crew, they excited them to disobedience; they persuaded them that they had the right to judge whether a measure that was proposed to them was good or bad". Contrary winds forced them to abandon the attempt and drive Ranger towards Ireland, causing more trouble for British shipping on the way.

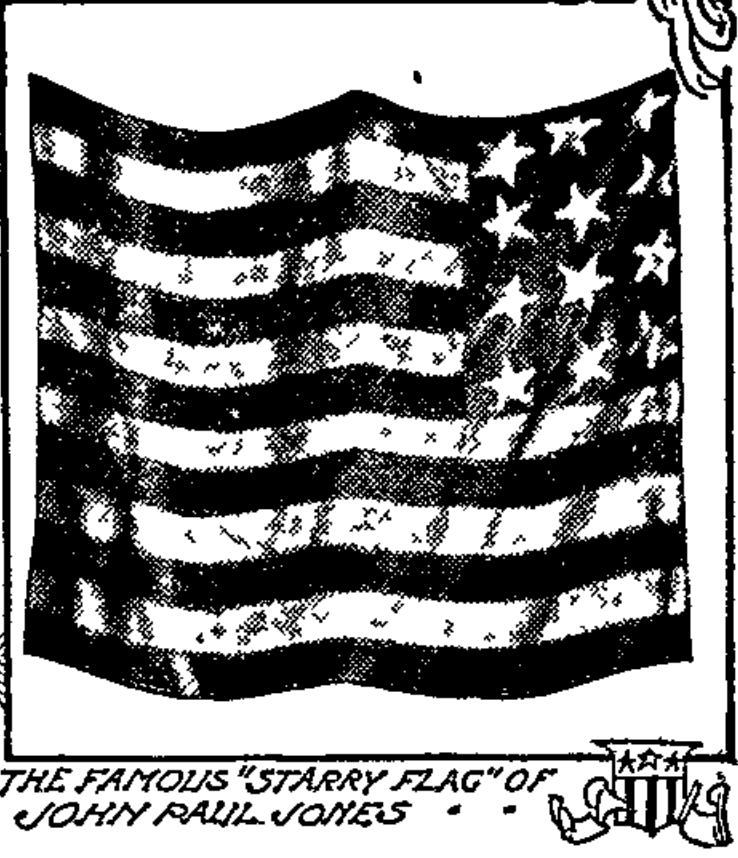
12-star American flag flown by the Ranger

On April 20, Jones learned from captured sailors that the Royal Navy sloop of war HMS Drake was anchored off Carrickfergus, Ireland. According to the diary of Ranger's surgeon, Jones's first intention was to attack the vessel in broad daylight, but his sailors were "unwilling to undertake it", another incident omitted from the official report. Therefore, the attack took place just after midnight, but the mate responsible for dropping the anchor to halt Ranger right alongside Drake misjudged the timing in the dark (Jones claims in his memoirs that the man was drunk), so Jones had to cut his anchor cable and run. The wind shifted, and Ranger recrossed the Irish Sea to make another attempt at raiding Whitehaven.

Jones led the assault with two boats of 15 men just after midnight on April 23, hoping to set fire to and sink all of the ships anchored in Whitehaven's harbor, which numbered between 200 and 400 wooden vessels and consisted of a full merchant fleet and many coal transporters. They also hoped to terrorize the townspeople by lighting further fires. As it happened, the journey to shore was slowed by shifting winds and a strong ebb tide. They successfully spiked the town's big defensive guns to prevent them from being fired, but lighting fires proved difficult as the lanterns in both boats had run out of fuel. To remedy this, some of the party were sent to raid a public house on the quayside, but the temptation to stop for a quick drink led to a further delay. Dawn was breaking by the time they returned and began the arson attacks, so efforts were concentrated on the coal ship Thompson in the hope that the flames would spread to adjacent vessels, all grounded by the low tide. However, in the twilight, one of the crew slipped away and alerted residents on a harbourside street. A fire alert was sounded, and large numbers of people ran to the quay, forcing the Americans to retreat and extinguishing the flames with the town's two fire engines. The townspeople's hopes of sinking Jones's boats with cannon fire were dashed because of the prudent spiking.

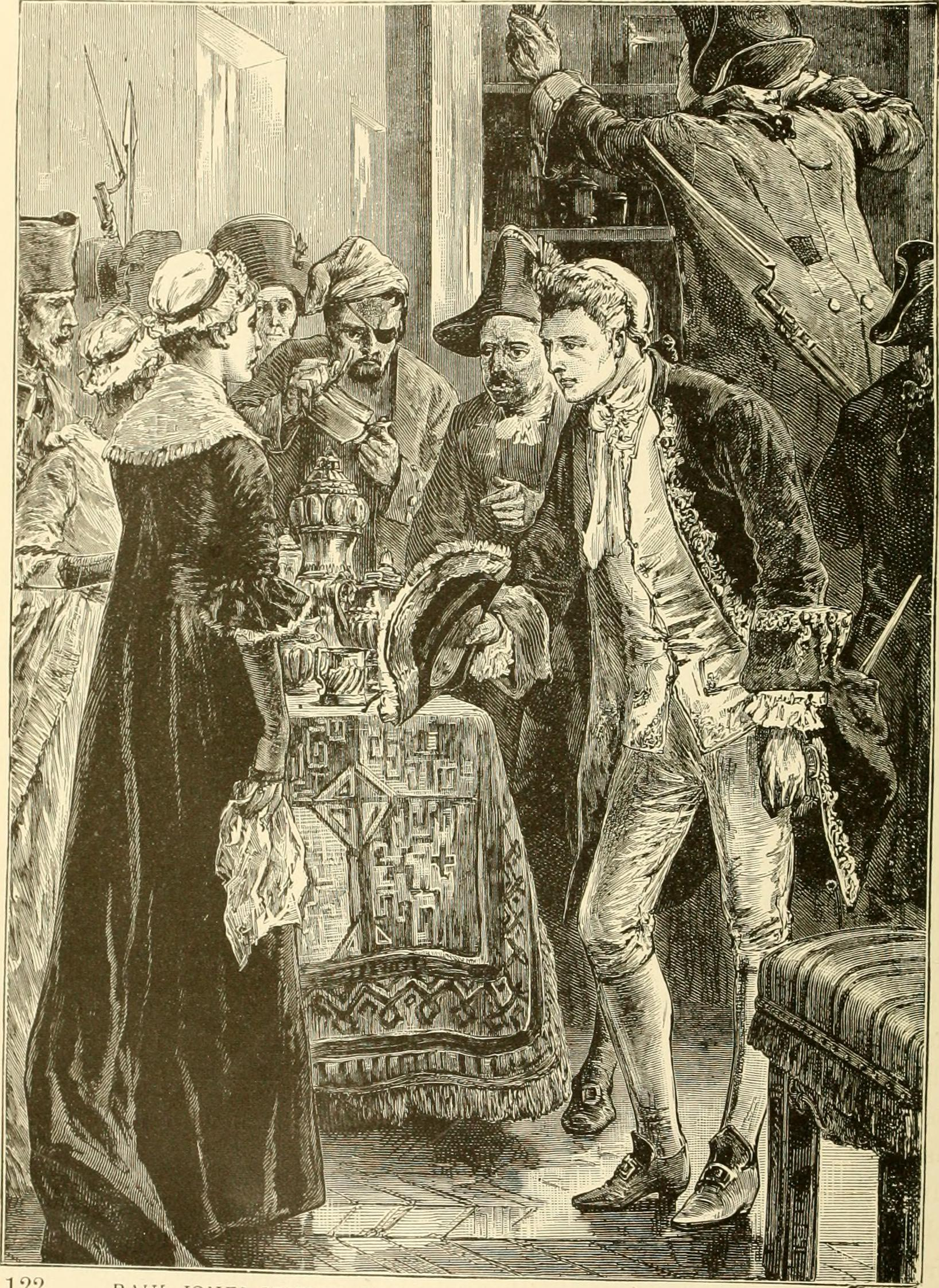
A 1903 illustration of John Paul Jones seizing Lady Selkirk's silverware

Jones next crossed the Solway Firth from Whitehaven to Scotland, hoping to hold for ransom Dunbar Douglas, 4th Earl of Selkirk, who lived on St Mary's Isle near Kirkcudbright. Jones reasoned that Douglas could be exchanged for American sailors impressed into the Royal Navy. Douglas was absent from his estate, so his wife entertained the officers and conducted the negotiations. Canadian historian Peter C. Newman gives credit to the governess for protecting the young heir to the Earldom of Selkirk, Thomas Douglas, and to the butler for filling a sack half with coal and topping it up with the family silver, in order to fob off the Americans. Jones claimed that he intended to return directly to his ship and continue seeking prizes elsewhere, but his crew wished to "pillage, burn, and plunder all they could". Ultimately, Jones allowed the crew to seize a silver plate set adorned with the family's emblem to placate their desires, but nothing else. Jones bought the plate when it was later sold off in France, and he returned it to Douglas after the war.

The attacks on St Mary's Isle and Whitehaven resulted in no prizes or profits, which would normally be shared with the crew. Throughout the mission, the crew acted as if they were aboard a privateer, not a warship, led by Lieutenant Thomas Simpson, Jones's second-in-command.

==== Return to Ireland ====
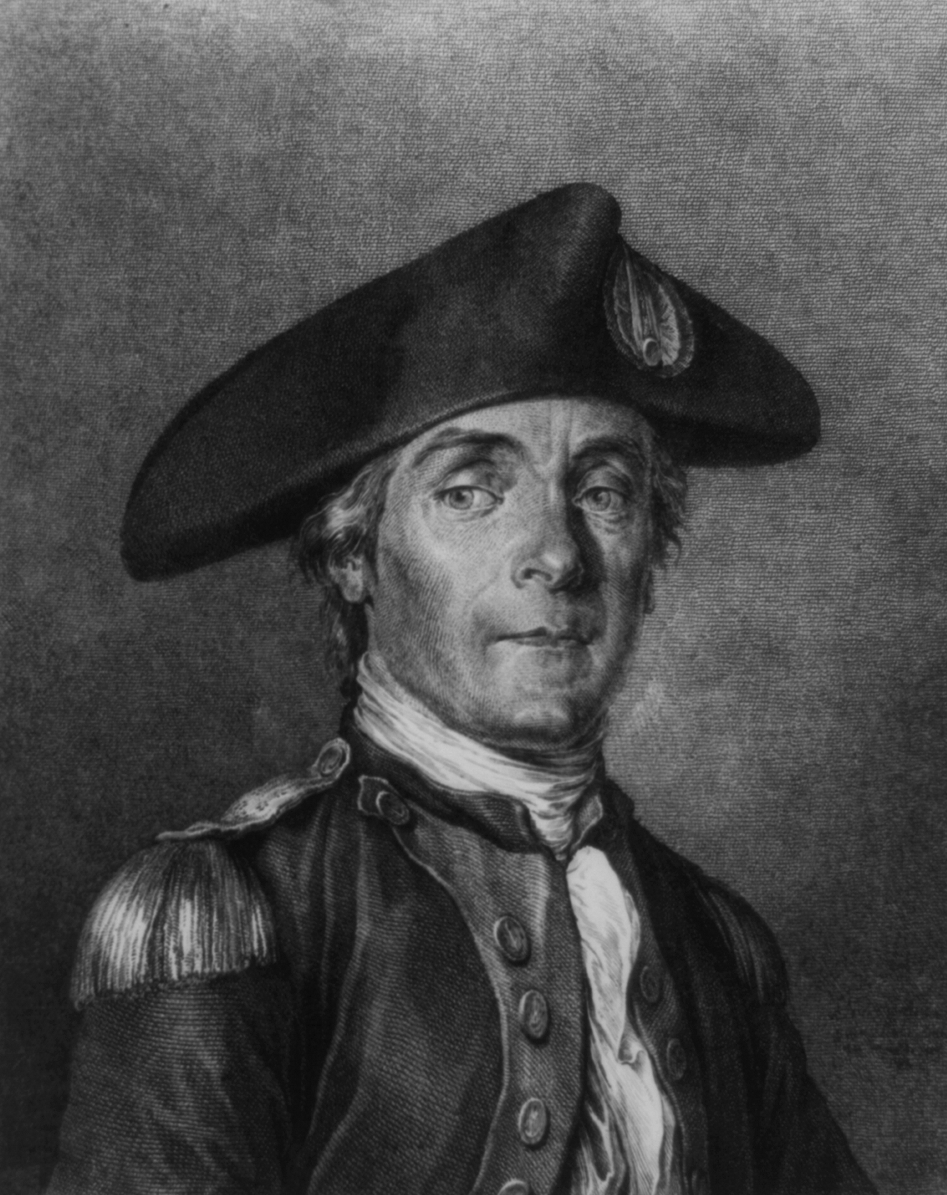
A 1781 illustration of Jones by Moreau le Jeune

Jones led Ranger back across the Irish Sea, hoping to make another attempt at Drake, still anchored off Carrickfergus. Late in the afternoon of April 24, the ships (roughly equal in firepower) engaged in combat. Earlier in the day, the Americans had captured the crew of a reconnaissance boat and learned that Drake had taken on dozens of soldiers with the intention of grappling and boarding Ranger, so Jones made sure that did not happen, capturing Drake after an hour-long gun battle in which British Captain George Burdon was killed. Simpson was given command of Drake for the return journey to Brest. The ships separated during the return journey as Ranger chased another prize, leading to a conflict between Simpson and Jones.

Both ships arrived at port safely, but Jones filed for a court-martial of Simpson, keeping him detained on the ship. Partly through the influence of John Adams, who was serving as a commissioner in France, Simpson was cleared of the charges brought by Jones. Adams implies in his memoirs that the overwhelming majority of the evidence supported Simpson's claims. Adams seemed to believe Jones was hoping to monopolize the mission's glory, especially by detaining Simpson on board while he celebrated the capture with numerous important European dignitaries. Even with the wealth of perspectives, including the commander's, it is difficult to determine what occurred. It is clear, however, that the crew felt alienated by their commander, who might well have been motivated by his pride. Jones believed his intentions were honorable and his actions strategically essential to the Revolution. Regardless of any controversy surrounding the mission, Ranger's capture of Drake was one of the Continental Navy's few significant military victories during the Revolution. Ranger's victory became an important symbol of the American spirit and served as an inspiration for the permanent establishment of the U.S. Navy after the revolution.

==== Bonhomme Richard ====
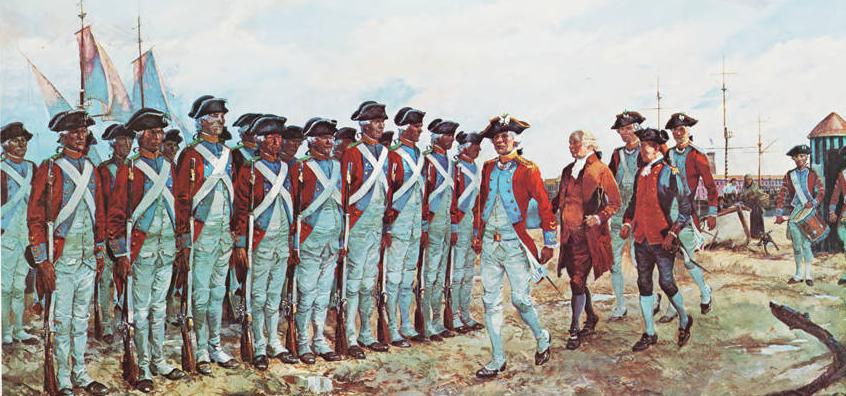
John Adams reviews Jones' Irish Marines at Lorient on 13 May 1779

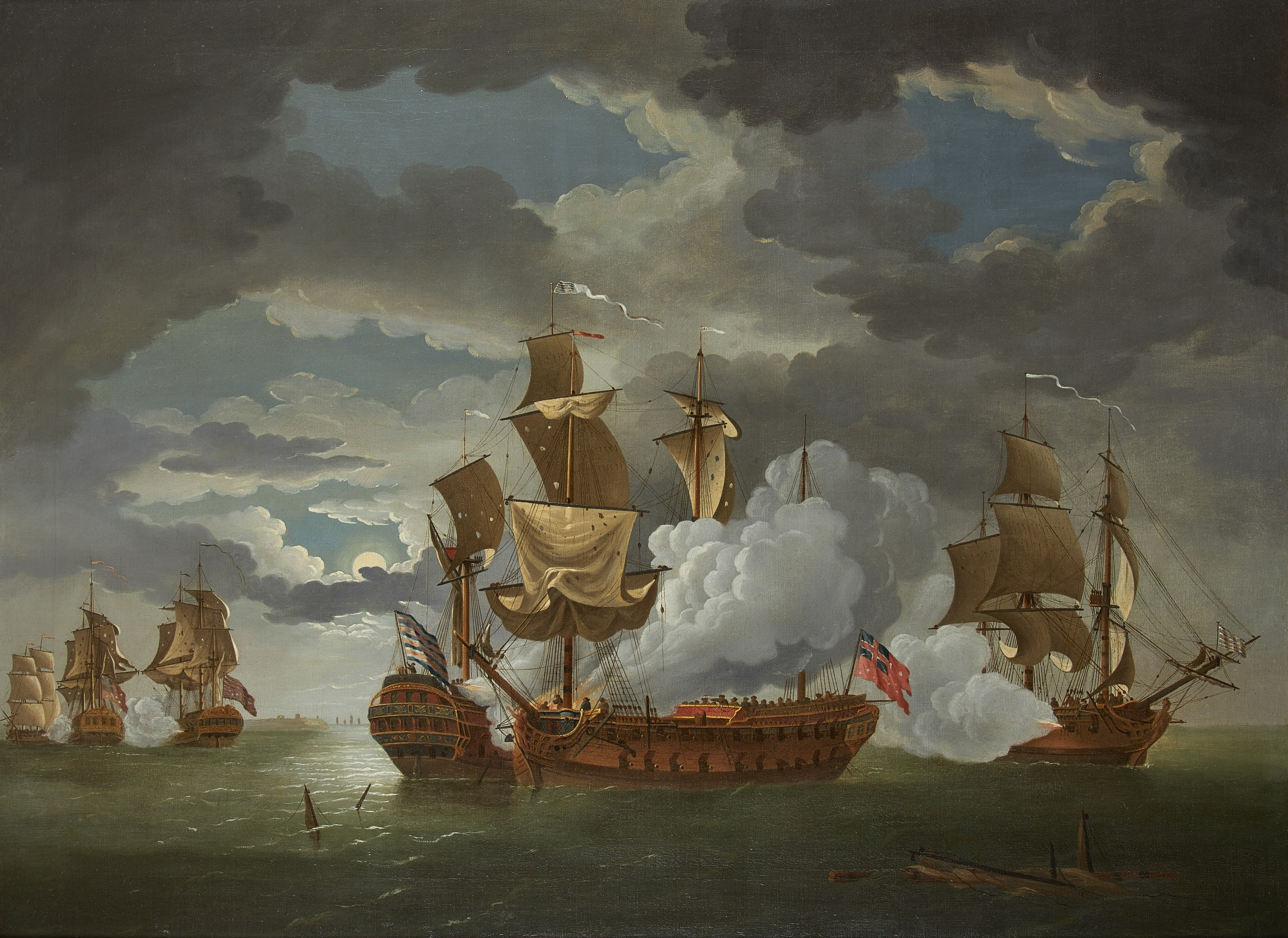
Action Between the Serapis and Bonhomme Richard a 1780 portrait by Richard Paton

The "John Paul Jones flag" was entered into Dutch records to help Jones avoid charges of piracy when he captured the Serapis under an "unknown flag."

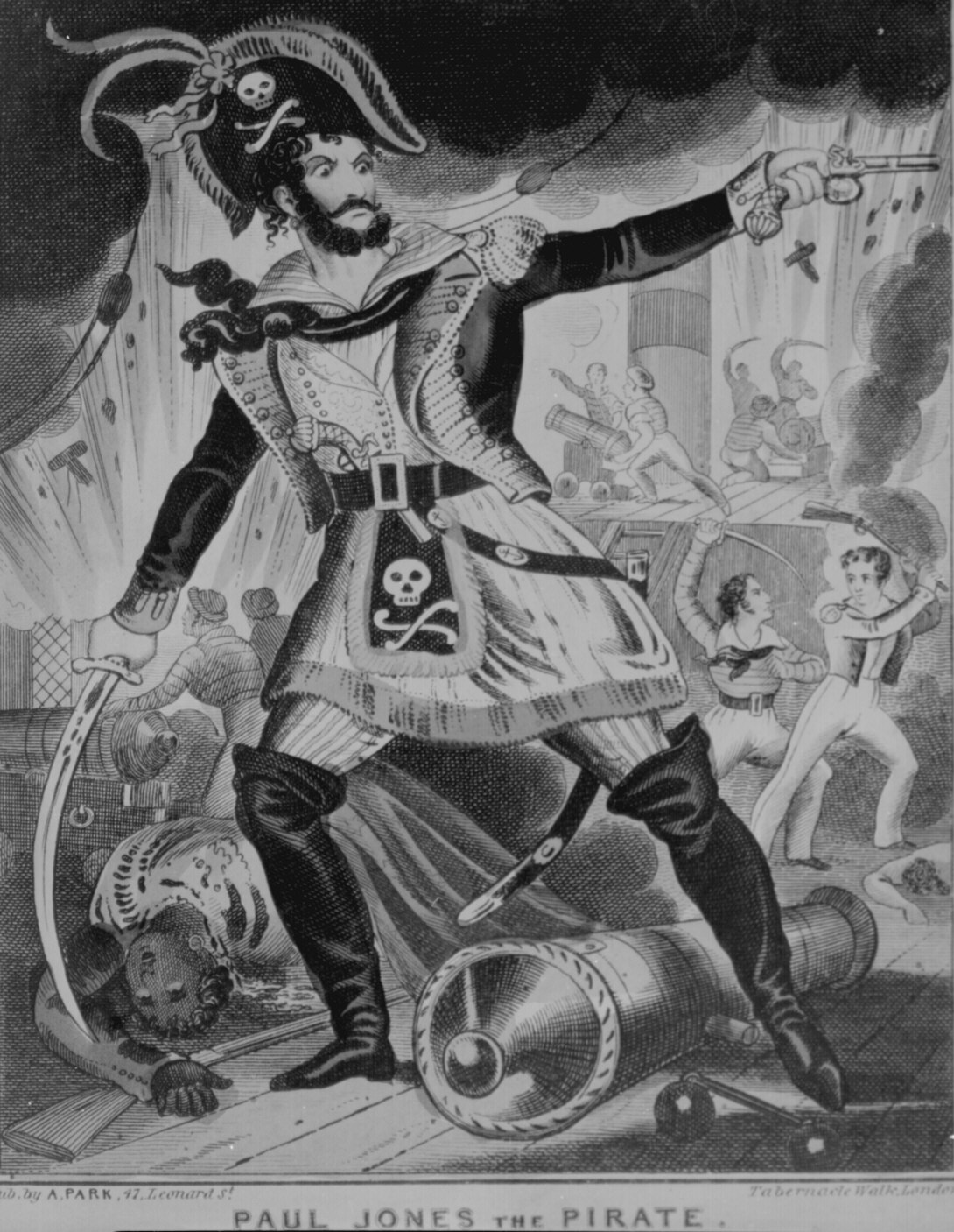
"Paul Jones the Pirate", a British caricature of John Paul Jones

In 1779 Jones took command of the 42-gun USS Bonhomme Richard, an East Indiaman rebuilt and given to America by French shipping magnate Jacques-Donatien Le Ray. The ship's name was a reference to Benjamin Franklin, an associate of Le Ray who was engaged in secret diplomacy with the French and who likely assisted in making the ship available. On August 14, as a vast French and Spanish invasion fleet approached England, he provided a diversion by heading for Ireland at the head of a five-ship squadron including the 36-gun USS Alliance, 32-gun USS Pallas, 12-gun USS Vengeance, and Le Cerf, also accompanied by two privateers, Monsieur and Granville. When the squadron was only a few days out of Groix, Monsieur separated because of a disagreement between her captain and Jones. Several Royal Navy warships were sent towards Ireland in pursuit of Jones, but on this occasion, he continued right around the north of Scotland into the North Sea. Jones's main problems, as on his previous voyage, resulted from insubordination, particularly by Pierre Landais, captain of Alliance.

On September 16–17, the squadron sailed into the Firth of Forth, preparing to raid Leith and Edinburgh. A fierce gale blew his squadron back out to sea, aborting the attack. Even though the attack failed, the panic resulted in the British authorities rapidly constructing Leith Fort. Ironically, Jones' father, John Paul Senior, was actually born in Leith in 1700.

On September 23, the squadron met a large merchant convoy off the coast of Flamborough Head, East Yorkshire. The 44-gun British frigate HMS Serapis and the 22-gun hired armed ship Countess of Scarborough placed themselves between the convoy and Jones's squadron, allowing the merchants to escape.

Shortly after 7 p.m., the Battle of Flamborough Head began. Serapis engaged Bonhomme Richard, and Alliance fired from a considerable distance at Countess. After sustaining significant damage from the Serapis and Alliance's bombardment, Jones quickly recognized that he could not win a battle of big guns, and with the wind dying he made every effort to lock Richard and Serapis together (his famous, albeit apocryphal, quotation, "I have not yet begun to fight!" was said to have been uttered in reply to a demand to surrender in this phase of the battle). After about an hour, he succeeded, and he began clearing the British decks with his deck guns and his Marine marksmen in the rigging. Alliance sailed past and fired a broadside, doing at least as much damage to Richard as to Serapis. Meanwhile, Countess of Scarborough had enticed Pallas downwind of the main battle, beginning a separate engagement. When Alliance approached this contest, about an hour after it had begun, the badly damaged Countess surrendered.

With Bonhomme Richard burning and sinking, it seems that her ensign was shot away; when one of the officers shouted a surrender, believing his captain to be dead, the British commander asked, seriously this time, if they had struck their colors. Jones later remembered saying something like "I am determined to make you strike", but the words allegedly heard by crew members and reported in newspapers a few days later were more like: "I may sink, but I'll be damned if I strike". An attempt by the British to board Bonhomme Richard was thwarted, and a grenade thrown by an American sailor caused the explosion of a large quantity of gunpowder on Serapis's lower gun-deck.

Alliance returned to the main battle, firing two broadsides. Again, these did at least as much damage to Richard as to Serapis, but the tactic worked to the extent that Serapis was unable to move. With Alliance keeping well out of the line of his own great guns, Captain Pearson of Serapis accepted that prolonging the battle could achieve nothing, so he surrendered. Most of Bonhomme Richard's crew transferred to other vessels, and after a day and a half of frantic repair efforts, it was decided that the ship could not be saved. Bonhomme Richard was allowed to sink, and Jones took command of Serapis for the trip to the island of Texel in neutral (but American-sympathizing) Holland.

In 1780 King Louis XVI of France honored Jones with the title "Chevalier". Jones accepted the honor and desired the title to be used thereafter: when the Continental Congress in 1787 resolved that a medal of gold be struck in commemoration of his "valor and brilliant services" it was to be presented to "Chevalier John Paul Jones". He also received from Louis XVI a decoration of "l'Institution du Mérite Militaire" and a sword. By contrast, in Britain at this time, he was usually denigrated as a pirate. Jones was admitted as an original member of The Society of the Cincinnati in Pennsylvania when it was established in 1783.

=== Russian service ===
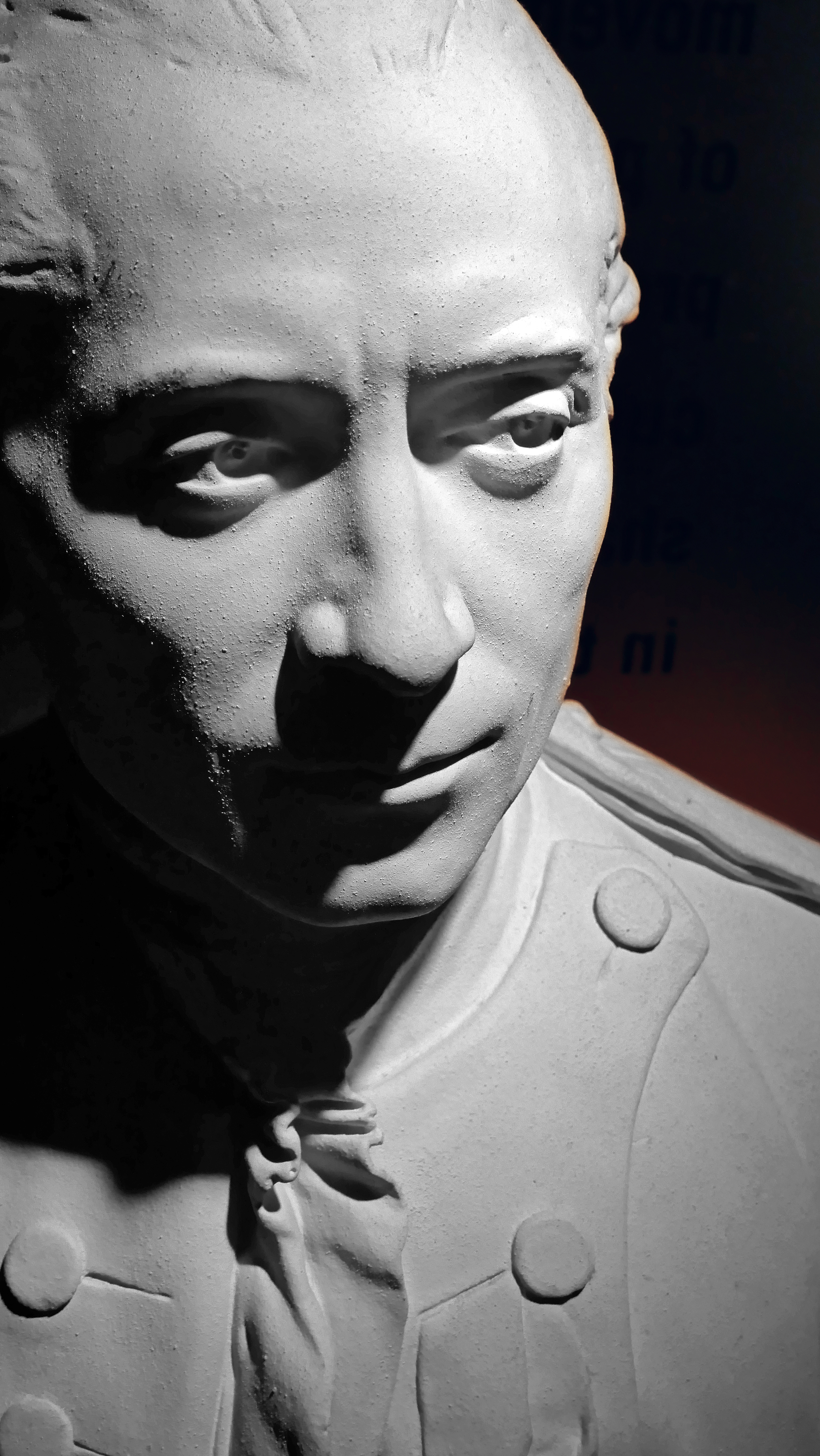
A 1908 plaster casting of John Paul Jones taken from an original model in 1781 by Jean-Antoine Houdon, now housed at the National Maritime Museum in Greenwich, London

In June 1782, Jones was appointed to command the 74-gun USS America, but his command fell through when Congress decided to give America to the French as a replacement for the wrecked Le Magnifique. As a result, he was given an assignment in Europe in 1783 to collect prize money due his former hands. At length, this too expired and Jones was left without prospects for active employment, leading him on April 23, 1787, to enter into the service of the Empress Catherine II of Russia, who placed great confidence in Jones, saying: "He will get to Constantinople". He was granted the name as a French subject Павел де Жонес (Pavel de Zhones, Paul de Jones).

As a rear admiral aboard the 24-gun flagship Vladimir, he took part in the naval campaign in the Dnieper-Bug Liman, an arm of the Black Sea, into which the Southern Bug and Dnieper rivers flow, against the Turks, in concert with the Dnieper Flotilla commanded by Prince Charles of Nassau-Siegen. Jones faced a considerably larger Turkish fleet, commanded by Hassan el Ghazi, comprising over 100 vessels, including 18 ships of the line and 40 frigates. Jones' ships were poorly built, manned by impressed serfs, and were not fully armed. Additionally, he had to communicate with his fleet through a translator.

At the Siege of Ochakov (1788), he wanted to use a defensive strategy and bickered with Nassau-Siegen, who wanted to rush in and attack. Jones wanted to use a V shape with his fleet, placing it at the mouth of the Bug River to funnel the Turkish navy down the river into a killing field created by deadly crossfire, but the wind was against him. Still, he had his fleet create this formation by throwing their anchors out and dragging themselves into place. The strategy worked, and the larger Turkish navy was defeated. During the battle, Nassau-Siegen's flagship fled the battle to a safe position. But when the battle was won and the enemy flagship was trapped, grounded on a sandbar, Jones ordered his crew to approach and capture the flagship. Instead, his Russian captain pulled up short, anchored himself, and let Nassau-Siegen claim the prize. Admiral Jones own report to the overall Russian commander, Prince Grigory Potemkin, was courteous of Nassau-Siegen and described the following:

"At eight o’clock, when the Prince of Nassau and I were in a Cutter, looking over our position and reconnoitering a little closer to our enemy, their Flotilla began to fire on us very vigorously. At the same time the first division of their Flotilla advanced along Shore and attacked our reserve, stationed between our ships and the Coast. We took their fire for some time without response, but, seeing the engagement was growing serious, I did my best to help the Prince make the necessary manoeuvres. Then I hurried along the line to bring up all the Batteries and other boats of the Flotilla. . . .The Turks, on their part, had brought up the second division of their Flotilla, and 1 hoped for some time that this would be a decisive battle; but the arrival of our Second division on the Battle-line put the Turks to rout and, with the wind against Us, we pursued them as far as their Squadron. . . . The Prince showed great coolness and intelligence . . . Mr. Alexiano came in another Cutter and helped us preserve good Order. ... I was greatly pleased by the conduct of the officers; they were brave and orderly; and I do not think the Captain Pasha [Hassan el Ghazi], who commanded in person, will eat his dinner with pleasure".

Despite Jones's successes and strategies, during this time, Prince Potemkin's letters to Empress Catherine credited Nassau-Siegen for preventing Jones from gathering power at court. When Jones confronted Potemkin and stated that Potemkin was being manipulated by Nassau-Siegen, Potemkin responded "No one manipulates me, not even the Empress!" Jones and Nassau-Siegen repulsed the Ottoman forces from the area, but the jealous intrigues of Nassau-Siegen (and perhaps Jones's own ineptitude for Imperial politics) turned Potemkin against Jones.

Jones was recalled to Saint Petersburg for the claimed purpose of transfer to a command in the North Sea. Other factors may have included the theoretical resentment of rival officers, some of whom were several ex-British naval officers also in Russian employment, who regarded Jones as a renegade and refused to speak to him. As a foreigner among the Russian court, Jones threatened the existing power structures. He had successfully defeated the Turkish navy and was no longer as important to the war. Potemkin was known for his deviousness and court intrigue, and as a man who allowed only sycophants to serve under him, and chafed at Jones's pride and inexpert courtly intrigue. After Jones' victory, Potemkin began to assign him impossible missions, designed to force him to fail.

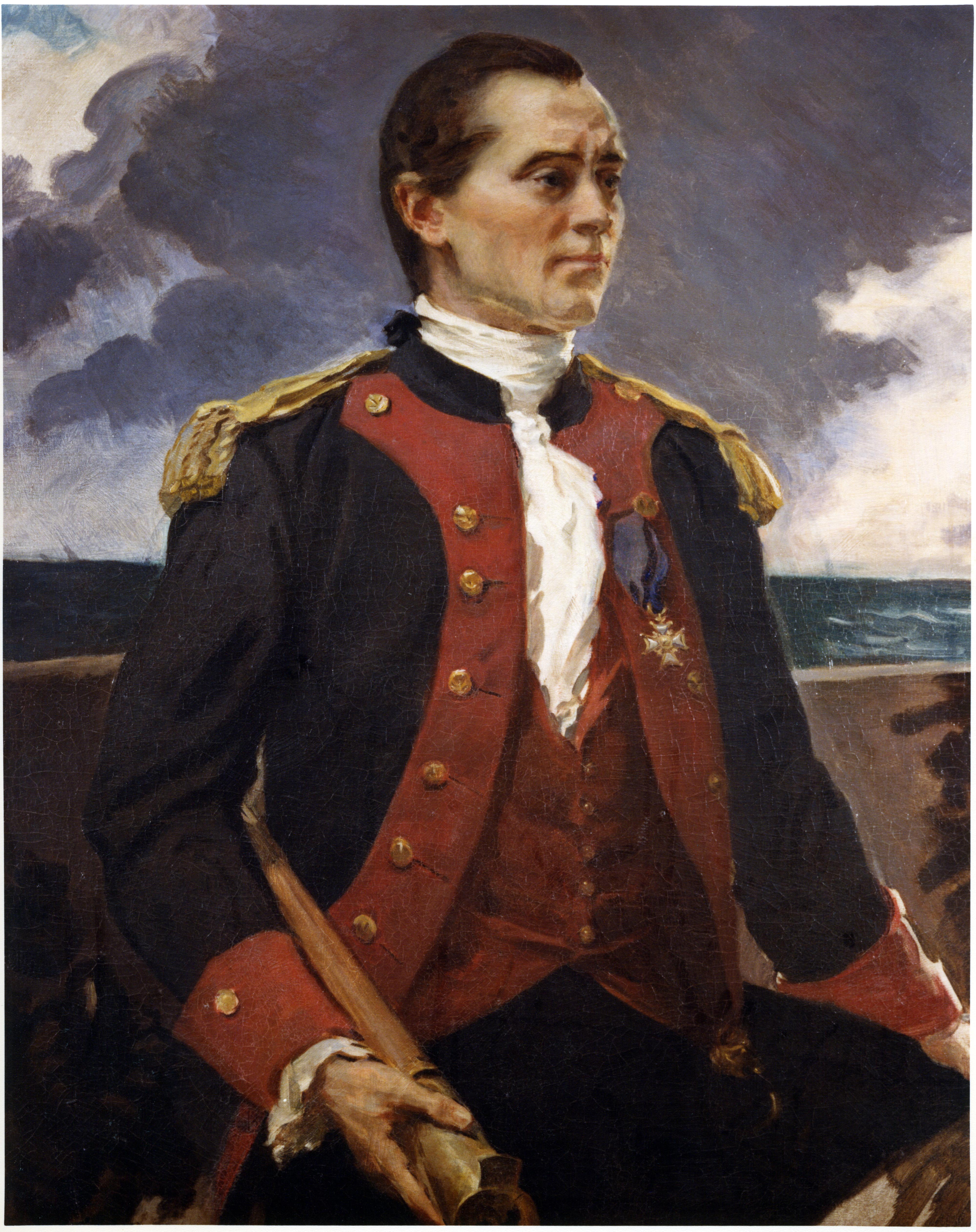
John Paul Jones depicted in a 1906 portrait by Cecilia Beaux

On June 8, 1788, Jones was awarded the Order of Saint Anna. In 1789, Jones arrived in Warsaw, Poland, where he befriended Tadeusz Kościuszko, a veteran of the American Revolutionary War. Kościuszko advised him to leave the service of Russia and serve another power, suggesting Sweden.

==== Rape suit and exile ====
On March 31, 1789, Jones was accused of raping a 10-year-old Russian girl named Katerina Stepanova, a "daughter of German immigrants living in St. Petersburg." She lived with her mother, who took care of her and began the legal proceedings.

Stepanova testified to the police that she had been summoned to Jones' apartment to sell him butter, when she was punched in the face by "a man wearing a white uniform, gold braids and a red ribbon," who then gagged her with a white handkerchief and vaginally penetrated her. A regimental surgeon and a midwife both examined her and found evidence to substantiate these physical and sexual assaults. Jones' manservant, Johann Gottfried Bahl, testified that Jones had been wearing his dress uniform when Stepanova entered Jones' chamber. He reported that on looking through a keyhole, he saw Jones was in a gown, not his uniform. Bahl also stated he "...later saw the girl leaving, her lips covered in blood and face swollen from weeping. He further told the police that he entered his master's chamber to make the bed that night and discovered drops of blood on the floor."

The rape had been reported slightly over a day after it was said to have occurred, which meant the case would ordinarily not have continued due to Russian statutory codes considering any such delay evidence of consent, but Catherine intervened directly to allow the legal proceedings to continue (she was known to intercede in "cases where women faced insurmountable odds").

Jones hired a lawyer, who soon quit the case, speculatively by order of Catherine via the Governor-General of St. Petersburg. Jones claimed in a statement to prosecutors that he had "often" paid Stepanova for sex previously, but he denied that he had raped her. Jones stated he had not taken her virginity and believed her to be older than was being claimed; he wrote, "I love women, I confess, and the pleasures that one only obtains from that sex; but to get such things by force is horrible to me." However, Jones later claimed the accusation was entirely false, stemming from the supposed desire of Katerina's mother, Sophia Fyodorovna, to gain financially from a prominent man. He also produced Katerina's father, Stephan Holtszwarthen, to testify in court that his daughter was 12 rather than 10 years old and that his wife had left him for another man, lived in a brothel, and was herself promiscuous. Jones involved the Comte de Ségur, the French representative at the Russian court (and also Jones's last friend in the capital), to whom he claimed that Stepanova had come asking him for "linen or lace to mend" and then "Performed indecent gestures," but that he had "Advised her not to enter upon so vile a career; gave her some money, and dismissed her." Ségur investigated the accusation and suggested to Potemkin that it was false, and that Jones was the victim of a plot by Prince Charles for his own purposes. Ségur advanced theories that Jones had either "offended men who shared the Empress's bed" or else that he had angered Catherine by refusing "advances" from her.

Jones' appeal to Potemkin "...fell on deaf ears, leaving Jones without Russian support against the judgment of the Russian sovereign." However, the international pressure applied by American and French connections via the Comte de Ségur persuaded Catherine to grant Jones two years' leave abroad, a de facto exile, rather than the usual punishment for rape by an officer of decapitation or a lifetime of penal labor; according to Jacob Bell:

The Empress' actions here proved her priorities. She dismissed a tried naval commander, especially sought out by her agents abroad, during wartime, showing that she merited the allegations against Jones higher than his potential martial service.

== Later life ==
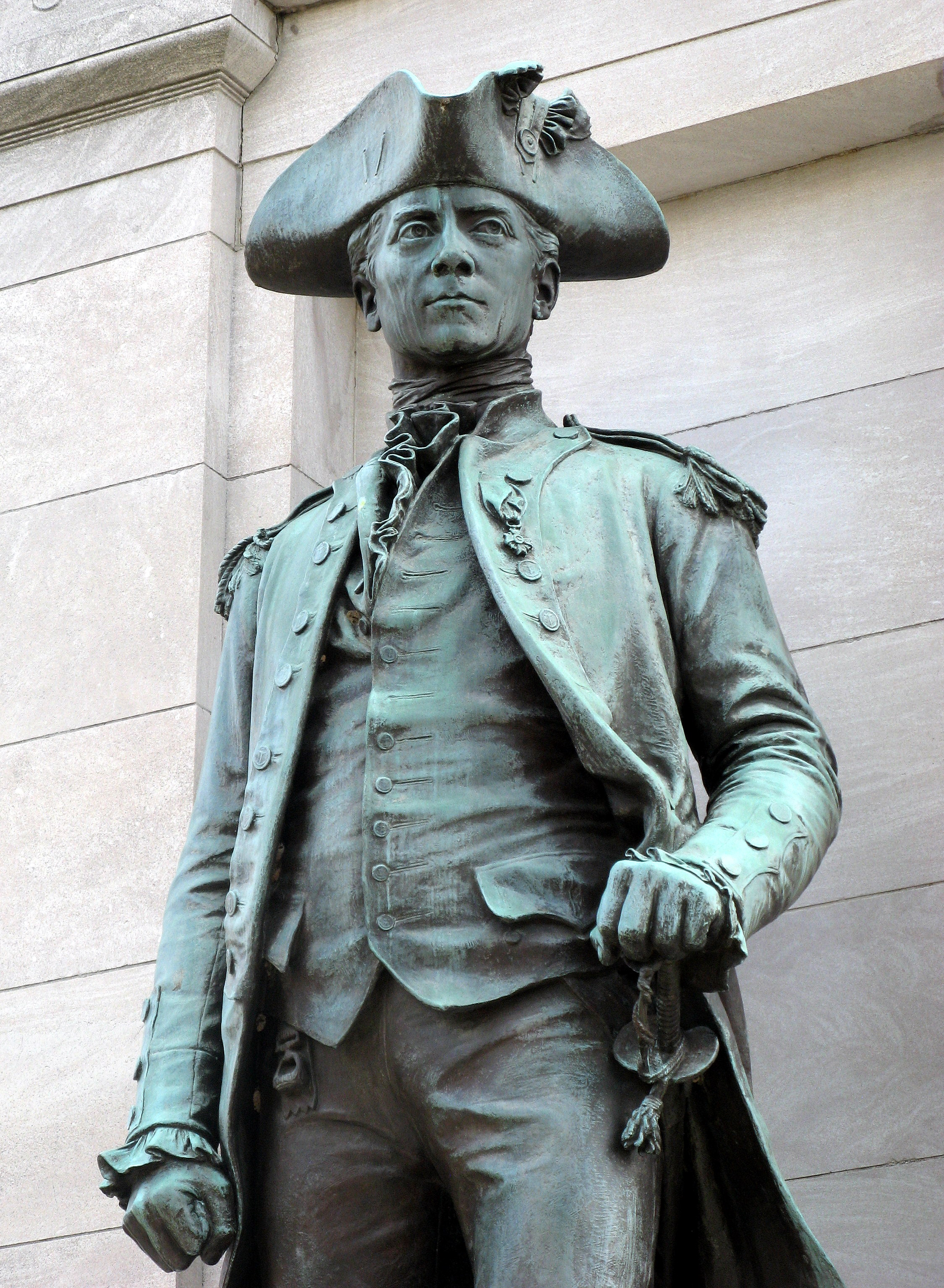
The John Paul Jones Memorial in Washington, D.C.

In May 1790, Jones arrived in Paris. He retained his position as Russian rear admiral, with a corresponding pension which allowed him to remain in retirement, but he was no longer able to find a foothold in Paris society. Thomas Carlyle writes of him, "Poor Paul! Hunger and dispiritment track thy sinking footsteps". During this time he made several attempts to re-enter the service in the Russian Navy. However, Catherine did not respond to his letters, explaining to their go-between Baron von Grimm that Jones' service record was not exceptional, and that as a result of the rape suit against Jones, Russian seamen refused to serve under him. Catherine also used her influence to block attempts by Jones to join the Danish and Swedish navies.

By this time, his memoirs had been published in Edinburgh. Inspired by them, James Fenimore Cooper and Alexandre Dumas later wrote their own adventure novels: Cooper's 1824 novel The Pilot contains fictionalized accounts of Jones's maritime activities, and Dumas' Captain Paul is a follow-up novel to The Pilot, published in 1846. During this period, he wrote his Narrative of the Campaign of the Liman.

In his addendum to the Encyclopedia of American Biography entry on Jones, Walter R. Herrick—citing S. E. Morison's, John Paul Jones: A Sailor's Biography (1959)—concludes "In sum, Jones was a sailor of indomitable courage, of strong will, and of great ability in his chosen career. On the other side of the coin, it must be admitted that he was also a hypocrite, a brawler, a rake, and a professional and social climber. Although these elements of his character do not detract from his feats at sea, they do, perhaps, cast in doubt his eligibility for a prominent place in the ranks of America's immortals."

== Death ==
In June 1792, Jones was appointed U.S. Consul to treat with the dey of Algiers for the release of American captives. Before Jones was able to fulfill his appointment, he was found dead lying face-down on his bed in his third-floor Paris apartment, No. 19 Rue de Tournon, in the 6th arrondissement, on July 18, 1792. According to one account, he was attended to by Samuel Blackden, unofficial envoy and long-time confidant to U.S. leaders. Jones was 45 years old. The cause of death was interstitial nephritis. He was buried in Paris at the Saint-Louis Cemetery, which belonged to the French royal family. In their obituaries, the American press had partially forgotten his achievements, and some describe him as a French war hero.

Upon his death, Jones was owed significant money and land by others. He was never directly paid for his service on the Bonhomme Richard and had instead been forced to purloin part of the sum paid to the vessel's officers. Three of the seven ships he had captured were requisitioned by Denmark, which never reimbursed him; he was instead granted an annual pension by the Danish king, but it was never paid either. He was also owed nearly 13,000 acres (5,300 ha) of land in western Pennsylvania, purchased from William Trent in 1783. Jones' will left both claims to his niece Janette Taylor, who came to America in 1830 to pursue them. She seems to have been unsuccessful, and following her death in 1843, the claims were more aggressively pursued by her successor George Leckie Lowden. Lowden obtained restitution for the ships, but Congress ignored his petition for the land.

Jones's grave was either unmarked, or the marker was stolen at an unknown point. By the time Americans began searching for his coffin in 1899, the record of his burial plot had also been lost, burned by the Paris Commune during the semaine sanglante. Meanwhile, his personal papers had been transferred among several people and finally were displayed in the shop window of a New York bakery, where in 1824 a customer noticed them and purchased them. A New York newspaper describes the papers as documents belonging to "Franklin, Hancock, La Fayette and John Adams," failing to mention Jones.

=== Exhumation and reburial ===
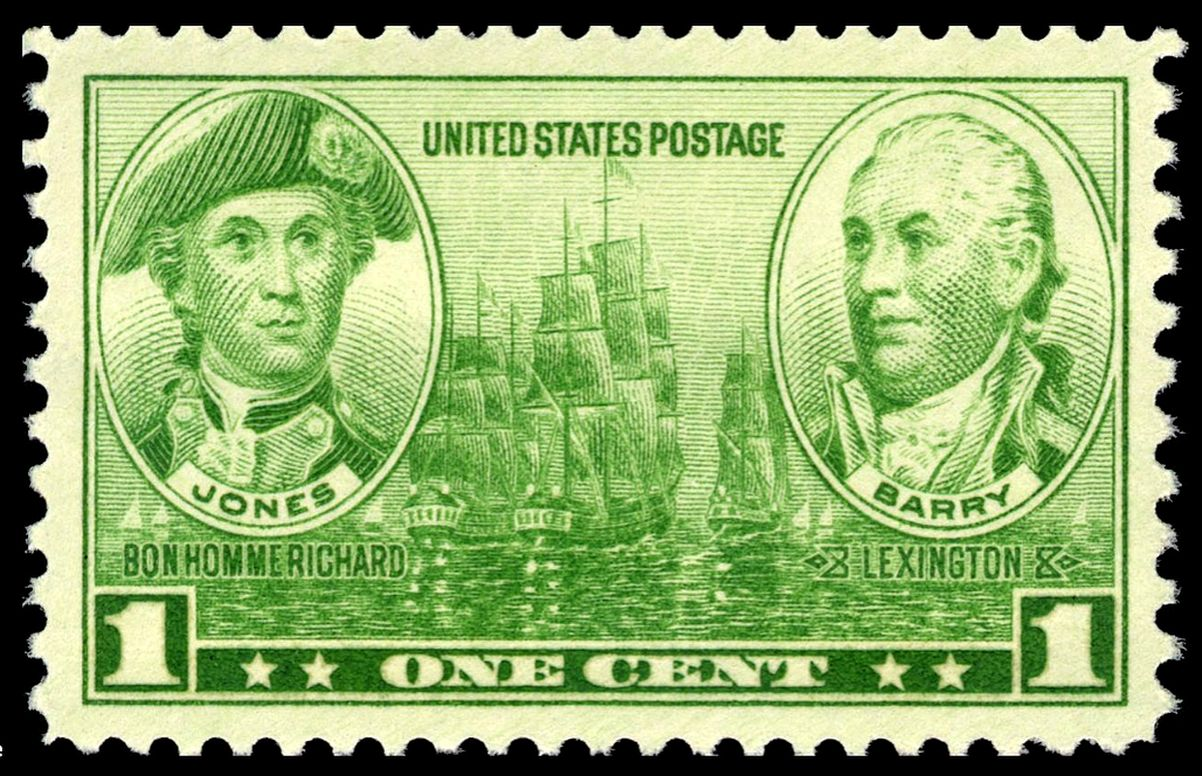
John Paul Jones and John Barry honored on U.S. postage Navy Issue of 1936

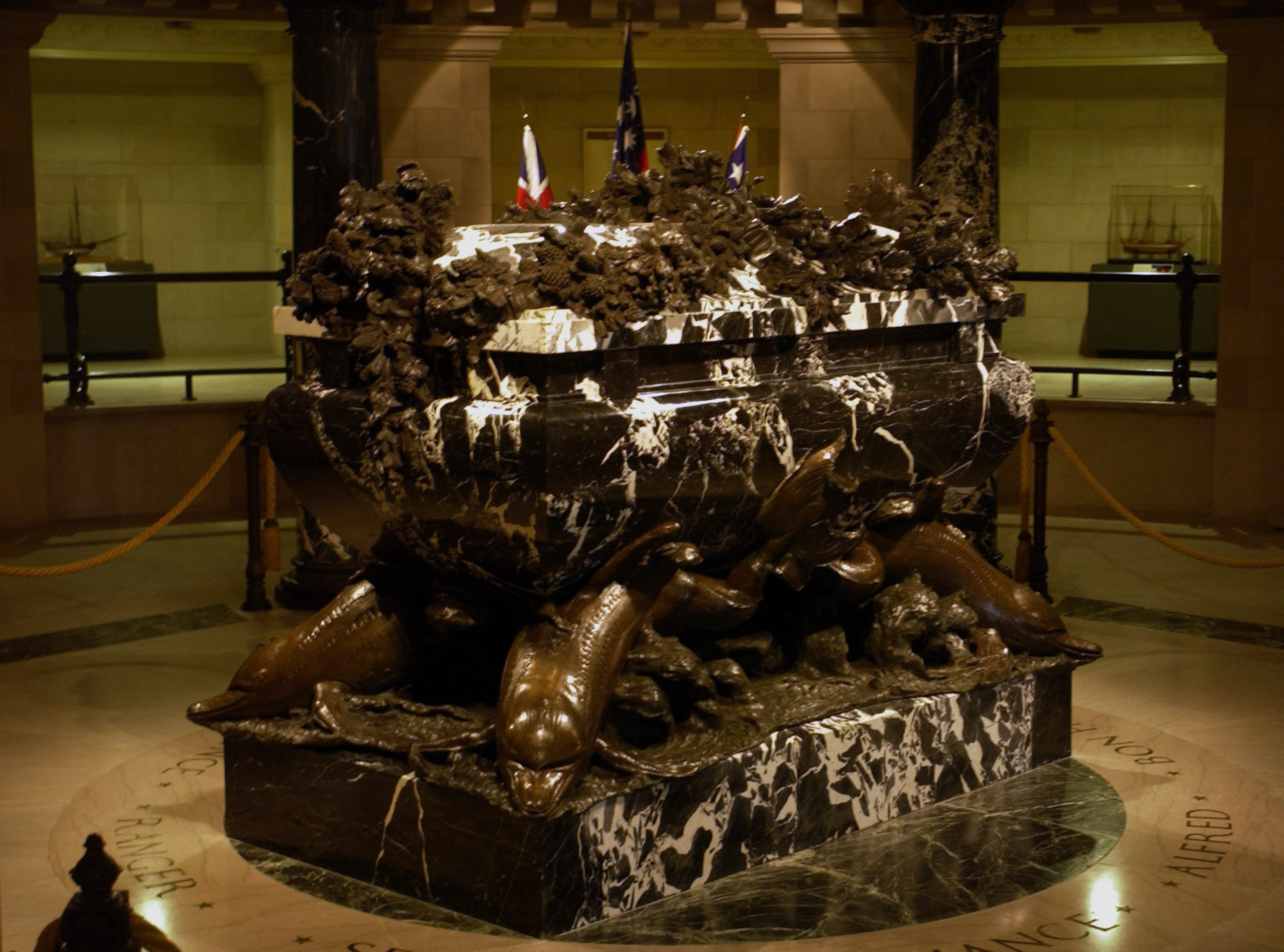
Jones's marble and bronze sarcophagus at the U.S. Naval Academy in Annapolis, Maryland

In 1905, Jones' remains were identified by U.S. Ambassador to France General Horace Porter, who had searched for six years to track down the body using a poor 1851 copy of the missing burial record. After Jones's death, Frenchman Pierrot François Simmoneau donated over 460 francs to mummify the body. It had been preserved in alcohol and interred in a lead coffin "in the event that should the United States decide to claim his remains, they might more easily be identified." Porter knew what to look for in his search. With the aid of an old map of Paris, Porter's team, which included anthropologist Louis Capitan, identified the site of the former St. Louis Cemetery for Alien Protestants. Sounding probes were used to search for lead coffins, and five coffins were ultimately exhumed. The third, unearthed on April 7, 1905, was immediately recognized as Jones' by the excavators. A post-mortem examination by Doctors Capitan and Georges Papillault confirmed their impression, finding several points by which the corpse could be identified as Jones. The autopsy confirmed the original listing of the cause of death. The face was later compared to a bust by Jean-Antoine Houdon.

Jones's body was brought to the United States aboard the USS Brooklyn (CA-3), escorted by three other cruisers, one being the USS Tacoma (CL-20). On approaching the American coastline, seven United States Navy battleships joined the procession escorting Jones's body back to America. On April 24, 1906, Jones's coffin was installed in Bancroft Hall at the U.S. Naval Academy, Annapolis, Maryland, following a ceremony in Dahlgren Hall, presided by President Theodore Roosevelt who gave a speech paying tribute to Jones and holding him up as an example to the officers of the Navy. On January 26, 1913, the captain's remains were finally re-interred in a bronze and marble sarcophagus, designed by Sylvain Salières, at the Naval Academy Chapel in Annapolis.

== Posthumous pardon at Whitehaven ==
Jones was given an honorary pardon in 1999 by the port of Whitehaven for his raid on the town, in the presence of Lieutenant Steve Lyons representing the United States Naval Attaché to the UK, and Yuri Fokine the Russian Ambassador to the UK. The United States Navy was also awarded the Freedom of the Port of Whitehaven, the only time the honour has been granted in its 400-year history. The pardon and freedom were arranged by Gerard Richardson as part of the launch of the series of Maritime Festival. Richardson's of Whitehaven, a wine and coffee merchant in the town, is now the honorary consulate to the United States Navy for the Town and Port of Whitehaven. In May 2017, the US Navy consul was US Navy Rear Admiral (retired) Steve Morgan, and the deputy consul was Rob Romano.

== In literature and the arts ==
James Fenimore Cooper wrote a historical novel The Pilot: A Tale of the Sea, published in 1823, featuring John Paul Jones as its main character. This novel was later reinterpreted by Alexandre Dumas in Captain Paul (Le Capitaine Paul), published in 1838. The film John Paul Jones (1959) includes a largely fictionalized portrayal of his private life. There is a 45-minute documentary about him, produced in 1995. In 1923, Franklin Delano Roosevelt wrote a screenplay about Jones and sent it to Paramount Pictures founder Adolph Zukor, who politely rejected it.

Johnny Horton wrote a sea shanty about John Paul Jones in 1960. The English folk band The Longest Johns made a song referring to him from the British perspective titled "John Paul Jones is a Pirate". Jones is a featured character in the American animated historical fiction television series Liberty's Kids. In the episode "Not Yet Begun to Fight", Jones (voiced by Liam Neeson) helps main character Sarah see that her true loyalty lies with America during the Battle of Flamborough Head. Jones' assault on Whitehaven and his capture of HMS Drake feature throughout Herman Melville's Israel Potter.

== See also ==
- John Paul Jones Cottage Museum, birthplace of Jones in Scotland
- John Paul Jones House, residence in New Hampshire during construction of America
- USS Paul Jones (1862), a steam gunboat, commissioned in 1862, decommissioned in 1867
- USS Paul Jones (DD-10), a Bainbridge-class destroyer, commissioned in 1902, decommissioned in 1919
- USS Paul Jones (DD-230), a Clemson-class destroyer, commissioned in 1921, decommissioned in 1945
- USS John Paul Jones (DD-932), a Forrest Sherman-class destroyer of the U.S. Navy. Commissioned 1956; decommissioned 1982
- USS John Paul Jones (DDG-53), an Arleigh Burke-class destroyer in active service in the U.S. Navy. Commissioned in 1993.

== Bibliography ==
- Boudriot, Jean (1987), John Paul Jones and the Bonhomme Richard (technical study of the ship), Collection archeologie navale française, ISBN 2-903178-20-8.
- Bradford, James C., ed. (1986), The papers of John Paul Jones (10 microfilm reels), Cambridge, UK; Alexandria, VA: Chadwyck-Healey.
- ——— (1986), Guide to the microfilm edition of the papers of John Paul Jones, 1747–1792, Alexandria, VA: Chadwyck-Healey.
- Brady, Cyrus Townsend (1906). Commodore Paul Jones. New York: D. Appleton & Co., 482 pp; original from Univ. California.
- Cotten, Elizabeth H. (1966), The John Paul Jones–Willie Jones Tradition, Charlotte: Heritage Printers, ASIN B0007F8TO2.
- de Koven, Reginald (Mrs.) (1913), The Life and Letters of John Paul Jones, London: Werner Laurie, 2 vols.
- Feld, Jonathan (2017), John Paul Jones's Locker: The Mutinous Men of the Continental Ship Ranger and the Confinement of Lieutenant Thomas Simpson, Washington, D.C.: Naval History and Heritage Command, archived from the original on June 29, 2017.
- Frost, John (1845), The Pictorial Book of The Commodores; Comprising Lives of Distinguished Commanders In The Navy of The United States, New York: Nafis & Cornish.
- Gilkerson, William (1987), The Ships of John Paul Jones (technical study), Annapolis, MD: Naval Institute Press, ISBN 0-87021-619-8.
- Goodheart, Adam (April 2006), "Home is the sailor", Smithsonian Magazine, pp. 32–46.
- "John Paul Jones", Harper's Magazine, vol. 11, no. 62, New York City, NY: Harper & Bros, pp. 145–70, 1855.
- Herrick Jr. "Jones, John Paul " in John A. Garraty, Encyclopedia of American Biography (1974) pp 598–599.
- Morison, Samuel Eliot (1999) [1959]. John Paul Jones: A Sailor's Biography. US Naval Institute Press Bluejacket Books. Raisz, Erwin, charts and diagrams. Boston, MA: Little, Brown & Co. ISBN 1-55750-410-5. LCC E207.J7 M6.
- Paullin, Charles Oscar (1906). The navy of the American Revolution: its administration, its policy and its achievements. Iowa: The Burrows Brothers/Republican Printing., 549 pp.
- Purcell, L. Edward (1993), Who was Who in the American Revolution, New York City, NY: Facts on File, ISBN 0-8160-2107-4.
- Sherburne, John H. The Life and Character of John Paul Jones. Adriance, Sherman & Co. Publishing. New York, pp. 10, 1851.
- Thomas, Evan (2003), John Paul Jones: Sailor, Hero, Father of the American Navy (popular biography), Waterville, ME: Thorndike Press, ISBN 0-7862-5875-6.
