= HMS Drake (1777) =

14-gun warship of the Royal Navy

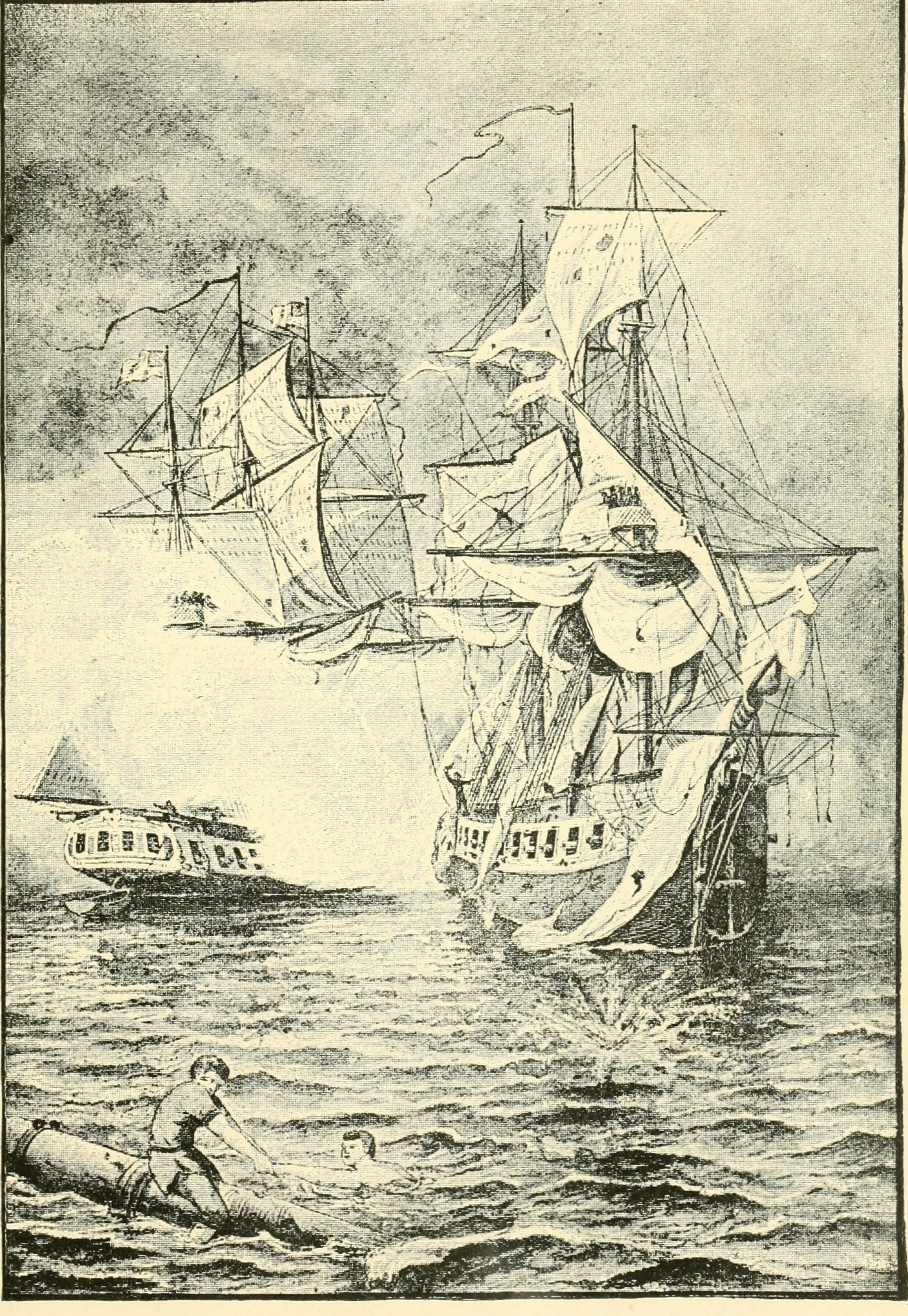

History

United Kingdom
- Name: HMS Drake
- Acquired: By purchase, 1777
- Fate: Captured by USS Ranger, 24 April 1778

General characteristics
- Type: Sloop-of-war
- Tons burthen: 274 61/94 bm
- Length: 91 ft 5 in (27.9 m) (gundeck); 75 ft 10.75 in (23.1 m) (keel)
- Beam: 26 ft 1 in (8.0 m)
- Depth of hold: 18 ft 3.5 in (5.58 m)
- Sail plan: Full-rigged ship
- Complement: 100
- Armament: 14 × 4-pounder guns

HMS Drake was a Royal Navy 14-gun ship rigged sloop-of-war with a displacement of 275 tons burthen. A former trading boat, the Drake was purchased and fitted out by the Royal Navy in 1777, to serve during the American Revolutionary War. Following a naval duel with Ranger of the Continental Navy in 1778, she was captured and sold in France. Drake then served as an escort ship for French convoys until 1781, when she joined the fleet protecting the Dutch Cape Colony and was purchased and incorporated into the French Navy. From 1782 to 1786, Drake was active in the Indian Ocean, after which date its status is unclear, possibly having been sold or broken up.

== Description ==
The Drake had 3 masts, 5 windows at the stern gallery, a quarter-deck, a figurehead representing a warrior in armour with a sword (probably the King of England Charles II). According to John Paul Jones the Drake was very similar to his former ship: the frigate USS Alfred (the ex-merchant ship the Black Prince).

== Career ==
Originally named the Royal Oak, (Note: The Royal Oak is the tree within which the future King Charles II of England hid to escape the Roundheads following the Battle of Worcester in 1651.) she was built in New England in 1775 by John Wharton from Philadelphia. She first sailed between London and Stettin as a tobacco-ship. She was then sold in 1776 and renamed Resolution. Captained by Edward Hawker, the ship traded between London, Boston, and Cork. On 4 March 1777 the Royal Navy purchased her at Plymouth for 3,000 pounds sterling. She completed fitting out as a warship on 24 May 1777. She became the ship-rigged sloop-of-war Drake with either 14, 18 or 20 guns. From July 17, 1777, she served in the American Revolutionary War. Her first mission was protecting the packet-boats between Harwich and Gorée.

On 24 April 1778, off Carrickfergus in northern Ireland, she fought the North Channel naval duel with the 18-gun sloop Ranger of the Continental Navy, commanded by Captain John Paul Jones. Five of Drake's crew, including her captain, George Burdon, were killed, and after an hour-long engagement, Drake surrendered to the Americans. Jones was able to evade capture and deliver Drake to Brest, France, as his prize on 8 May 1778. This was the first, and most complete, American victory over any Royal Navy vessel in British waters. Drake's crew were subsequently held on a prison ship in Brest, until 20 August 1778 when the carpenter's mate William Overy, and four other sailors, escaped in a small boat. After rowing out of the harbour, they stole a French fishing vessel and put to sea, eventually encountering a British lugger which escorted them to the Channel Islands and then to Plymouth.

At Brest, Jones sold Drake to his friend Jonathan Williams, who handed her over the next year to Jean Peltier-Dudoyer in Nantes. In July 1779, she left Nantes for Brest, under captain Jean-Baptiste Cotton de Chaucy, having been chartered by the French to escort a 10-vessel convoy between Brest and the Antillas, assisted by the frigate Fier-Rodrigue. The latter was unexpectedly requisitioned by the French Navy and the convoy was cancelled. Still under charter to the French, between March 1780 and January 1781 Drake, under Captain J. B. Cotton de Chauncy, made two trips to North America and the West Indies, transporting Jean-Baptiste Rochambeau's troops in Charles de Ternay's squadron and returning to France with messages for the King.

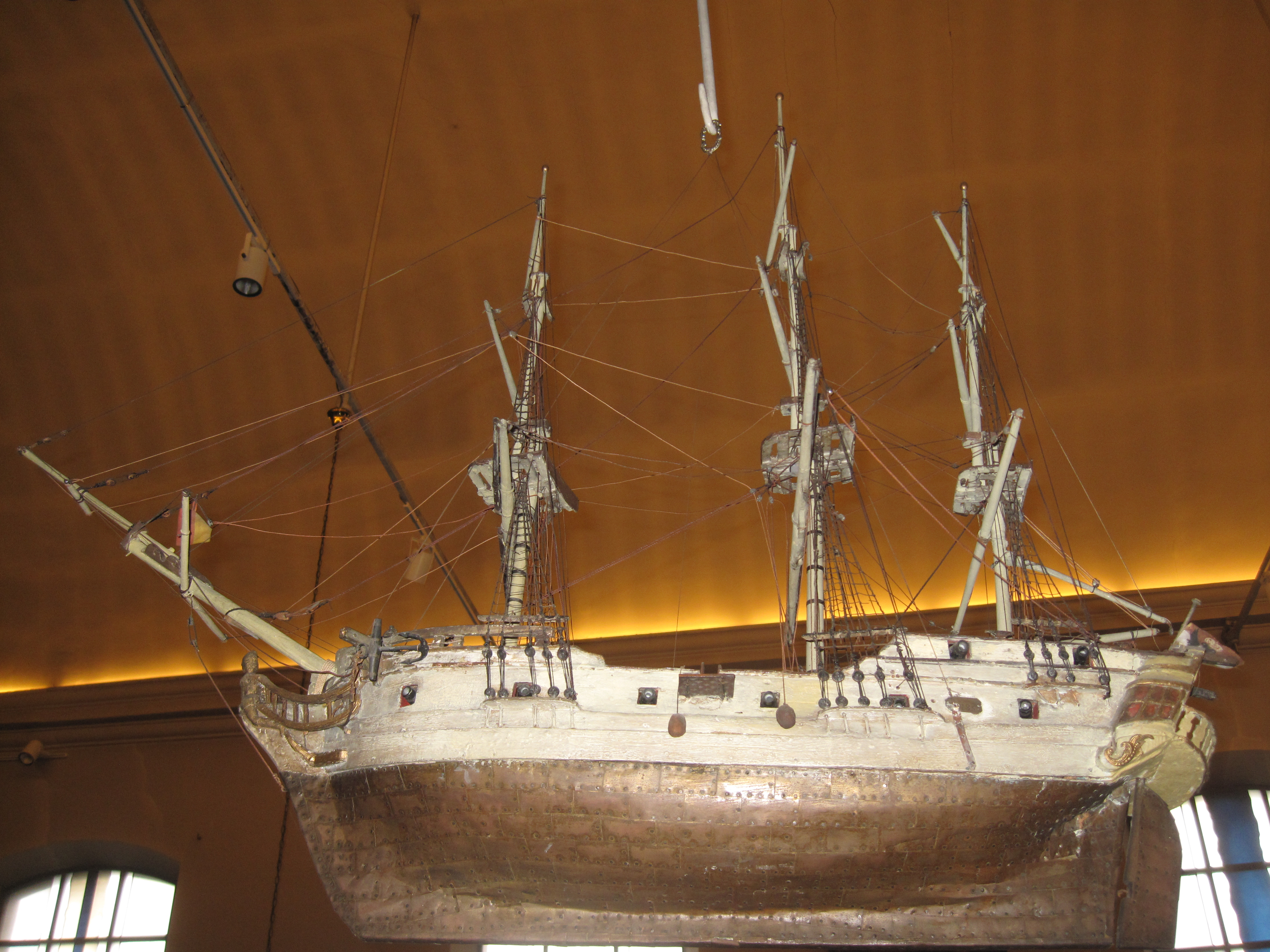
Model of an 18th-century American built16-gun coppered sloop-of-war

At the beginning of 1781, Jean Peltier Dudoyer prepared five ships in Nantes for the Dutch East India Company, to protect the Dutch Cape Colony in southern Africa against an anticipated attack by England. The Drake's captain, Marc Antoine Fauvet, was at the Cape in November 1781, joining de Pernier's squadron whose mission was to bring victuals and troops to the fleet of Pierre André de Suffren at Isle de France (Maurice Island). The Drake returned to the Cape on 20 May 1782. There, on 2 September 1782, she was sold to the French government by Robert Pitot for 849,000 livres and incorporated into the French Navy.

She sailed again to Isle de France in November, left on 1 December 1782, and arrived at Trincomalee in Ceylon (modern Sri Lanka) on 10 March 1783. In the meantime, peace was declared, news of it reaching the East Indian Fleet on 29 June. Suffren sailed home, but de Pernier stayed in the Indian Ocean with five ships-of-the-line and some frigates and sloops-of-war. From December 1784 to February 1786, the Drake, captained by Pierre Arnoult Deshayes, was sent by Governor Marquis de Bussy from Pondicherry, India, to Bago, Burma, to assist another royal flûte, the Baleine. She was being detained by the local authorities, and Deshayes was to attempt to persuade them to release her. By the autumn of 1785 she had been released, as it is known that she departed Isle of France on 24 July 1785 and arrived at Lorient, and then at Rochefort, being decommissioned there on 28 March 1786. As for the Drake, her departure from Bago, which was scheduled for March 1785, was delayed by eleven months, first because of a bill of exchange having not been paid in Pondicherry, and secondly because of war suddenly breaking out between the Burmese and the Siamese. The Drake finally arrived at Pondicherry in May 1786 and then disappears from the records. She may have been sold or broken up there, having been out of France for 4 long years.
