= John Paul Jones House =

Historic house in New Hampshire, United States

- U.S. National Register of Historic Places
- U.S. National Historic Landmark
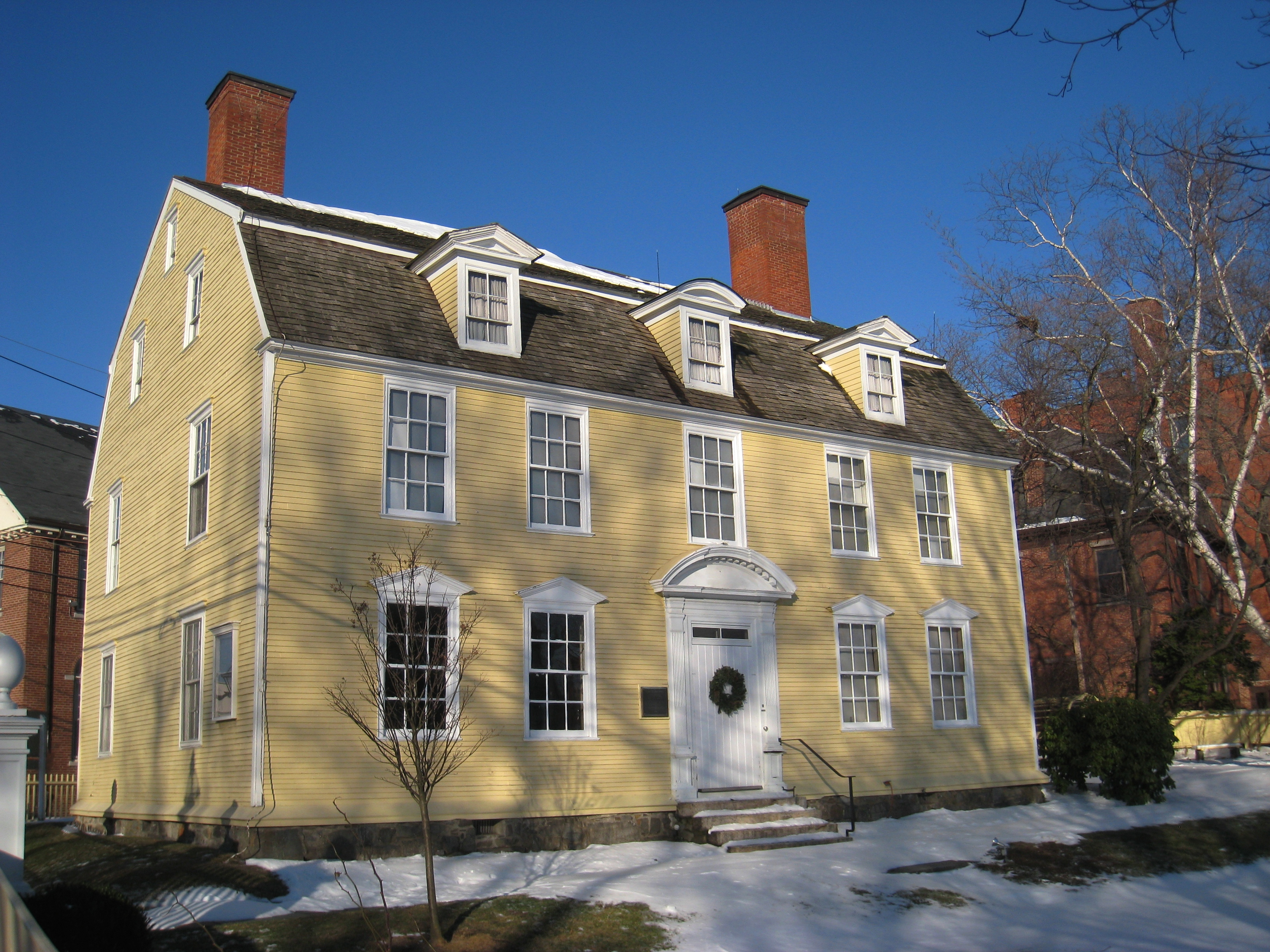

- Location within New Hampshire Location within the United States
- Location: Portsmouth, New Hampshire
- Coordinates: 43.075198°N 70.760334°W
- Built: 1758
- Architect: Capt. Gregory Purcell
- Architectural style: Georgian
- NRHP reference No.: 72000084

Significant dates
- Added to NRHP: November 28, 1972
- Designated NHL: November 28, 1972

The John Paul Jones House is a historic house at 43 Middle Street in Portsmouth, New Hampshire. Now a historic house museum and a National Historic Landmark, it is where American Revolutionary War naval hero John Paul Jones, resided from 1781 to 1782 when it was operated as a boarding house. He also lived in a home in Fredericksburg, Virginia, on Caroline Street, owned by his brother.

== History ==
The 2 1/2-story wood-frame house was built in 1758 by the master housewright Hopestill Cheswell, a successful African-American builder in the city. The house was built for Captain Gregory Purcell, who owned it with his wife Sarah until his death in 1776.

After Purcell's death his wife took in boarders, until her own death in 1783. The American naval hero John Paul Jones rented a room at the widow Purcell's during 1781–1782, while supervising construction of the ship America.

The house was declared a National Historic Landmark in 1972.

== Description ==
The house is 2 1/2 stories high, with a gambrel roof, and two chimneys projecting from the interior. A two-story addition to the northeast was added in the early 19th century. The five-bay main facade has a central entry topped by a segmented arch pediment, supported by flanking pilasters. The first floor windows of the main facade are topped by triangular pediments. The interior of the house follows a typical Georgian center-hall plan, with rooms flanking a central hall with stairs. To the left of the hall are a parlor in front, and a counting room or office in the rear, while to the right is a large dining room with what was originally the kitchen behind. Upstairs there are four bedrooms; that of Jones was in the southeast corner. The third floor has five bedrooms.

The downstairs rooms now contain museum exhibits, and the dining room has been decorated to early 19th-century taste. The house has belonged to the Portsmouth Historical Society since 1919, and is open to the public.

== See also ==
- John Paul Jones Cottage Museum, birthplace of Jones in Scotland
- List of National Historic Landmarks in New Hampshire
- National Register of Historic Places listings in Rockingham County, New Hampshire
