= Loaningfoot =

Coordinates: 55.052°N 3.567°W

Loaningfoot is a hamlet in the parish of Kirkbean in Dumfries and Galloway, Scotland. It is 10 miles ESE of the town of Dalbeattie.
