= Sylvain Salières =

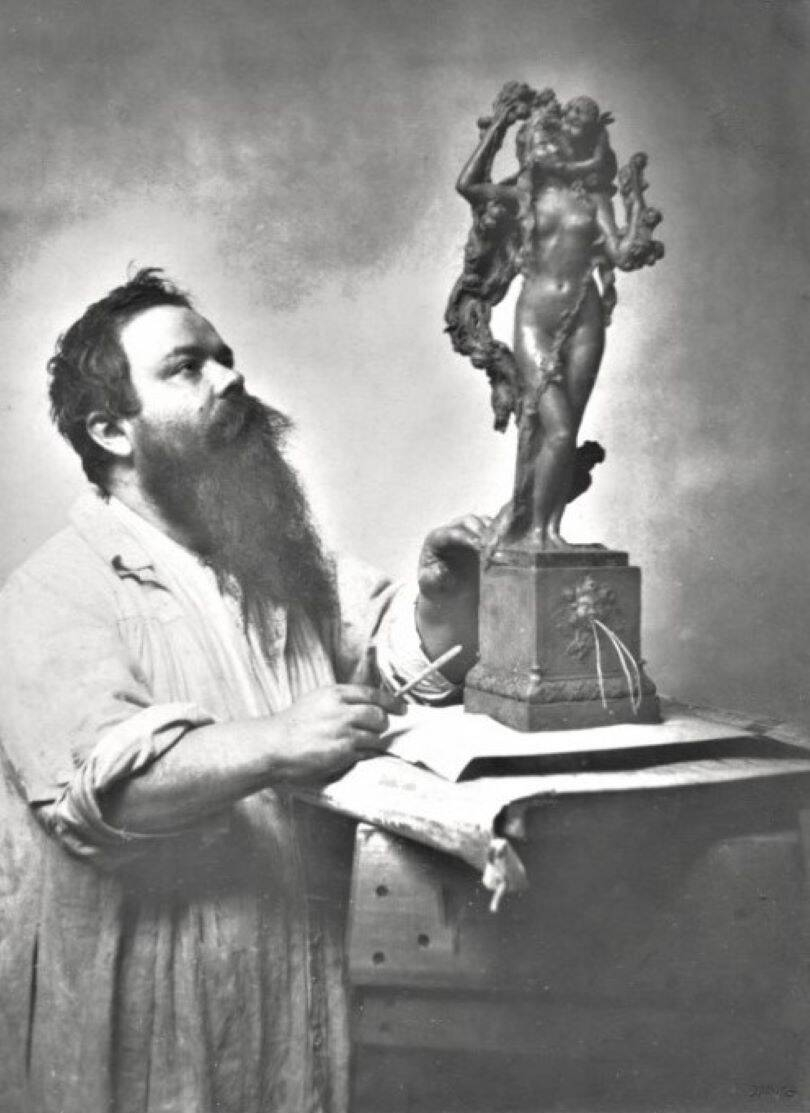
Sylvain Salières with his sculpture

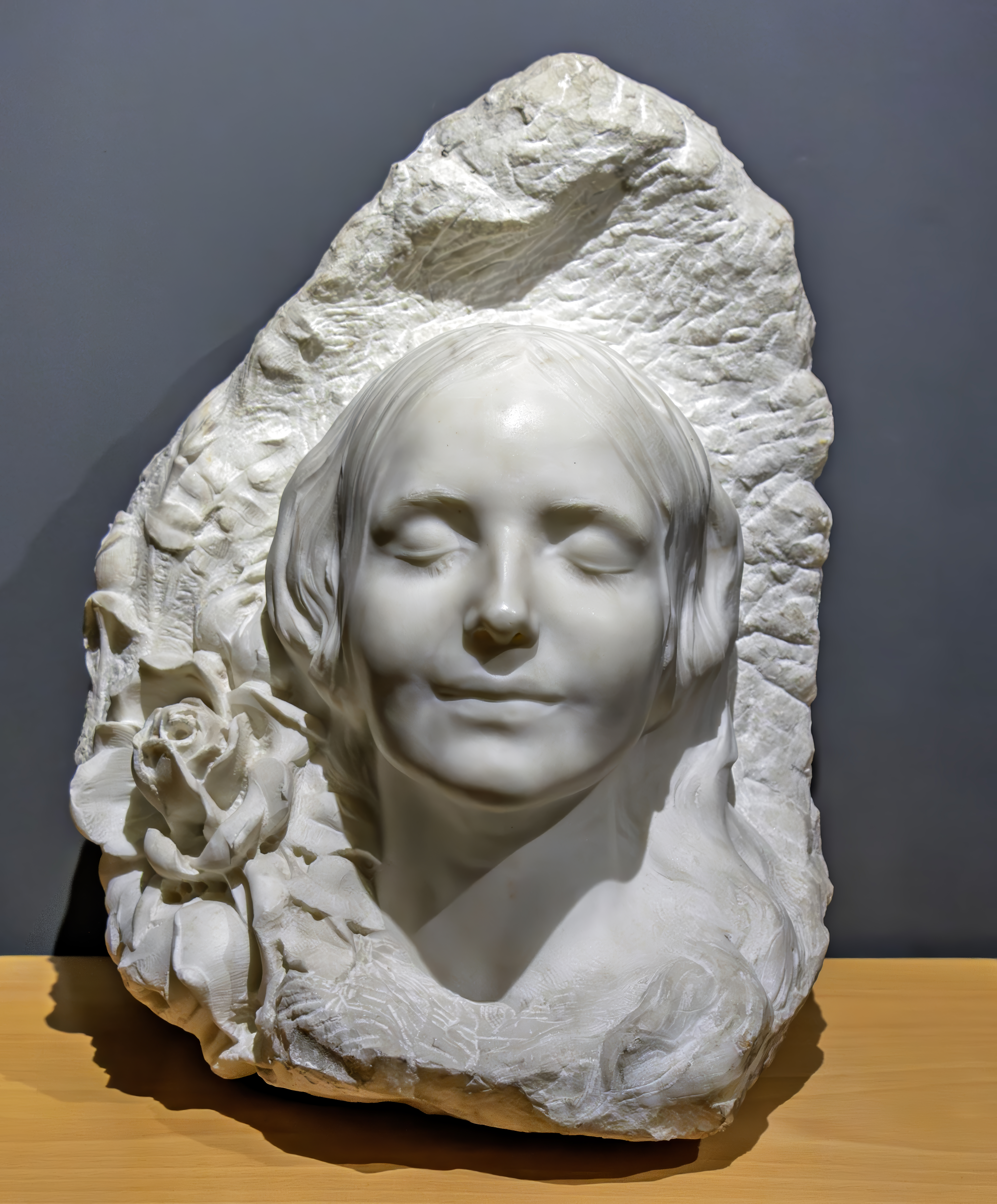
Tête de Femme endormie by Sylvain Salières - Musée des Amériques

Sylvain Salières (1865-1920) was a French-born sculptor.

== Biography ==
He was born in Escornebœuf in Gers, France in 1865. He was one of several French artists that Whitney Warren helped to immigrate to the United States. He stayed in New York for five years, and then moved to Pittsburgh, where he served as head of the School of Sculpture at the Carnegie Institute of Technology until his death in Pittsburgh in 1920.

== Works ==
Among his notable works are the ornamentation of Grand Central Terminal in New York City (completed in 1913) and the sarcophagus of John Paul Jones in Annapolis, Maryland. His work on Grand Central included ornaments and inscriptions around the Glory of Commerce sculptural group on the headhouse exterior, sculpted lunettes in the ceiling of the Main Concourse, ornamental bands on the ceiling of Vanderbilt Hall, foliage carvings above each train gate in the Dining Concourse, and metalwork on the various grills, frames, doorways, and moldings throughout the station.
