= North Channel Naval Duel =

1778 battle of the American Revolutionary War

- Part of the American War of Independence
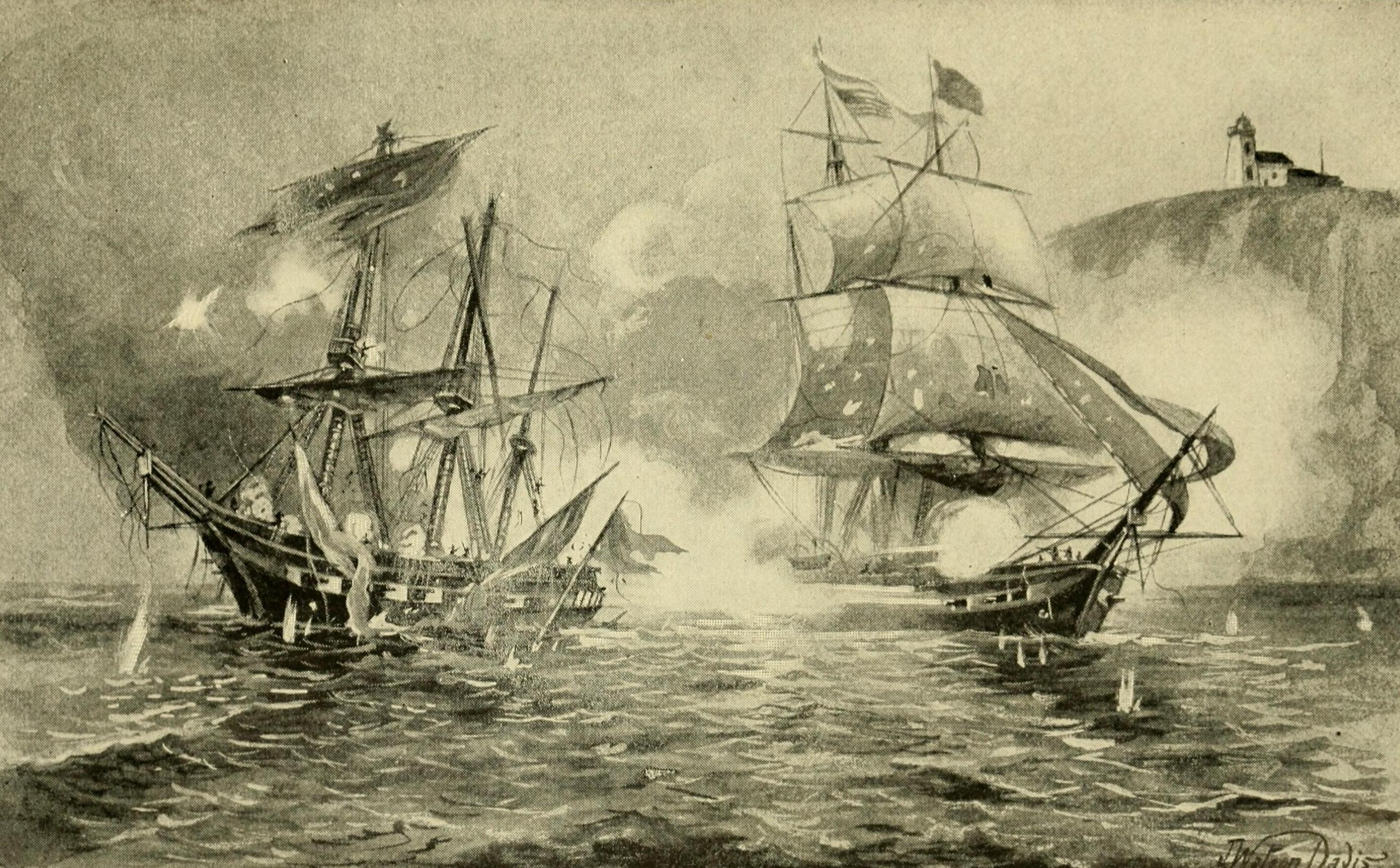
- American illustration of the battle
Date	24 April 1778
Location	North Channel, Irish Sea 54°43′27″N 5°27′00″W
Result	American victory

Belligerents
United States	Great Britain

Commanders and leaders
John Paul Jones	George Burdon †

Strength
1 sloop-of-war	1 sloop-of-war

Casualties and losses
3 killed 5 wounded	5 killed 20 wounded 1 sloop-of-war captured

The North Channel Naval Duel was a single-ship action between the Continental Navy sloop-of-war Ranger (Captain John Paul Jones) and the Royal Navy sloop-of-war Drake (Captain George Burdon) on the evening of 24 April 1778. Fought in the North Channel, separating Ireland from Scotland, it was the first American naval success within Atlantic waters and also one of the only American naval victories in the conflict achieved without an overwhelming superiority of force. The action was one of a series of actions by Jones that brought the war to British waters.

== Background ==
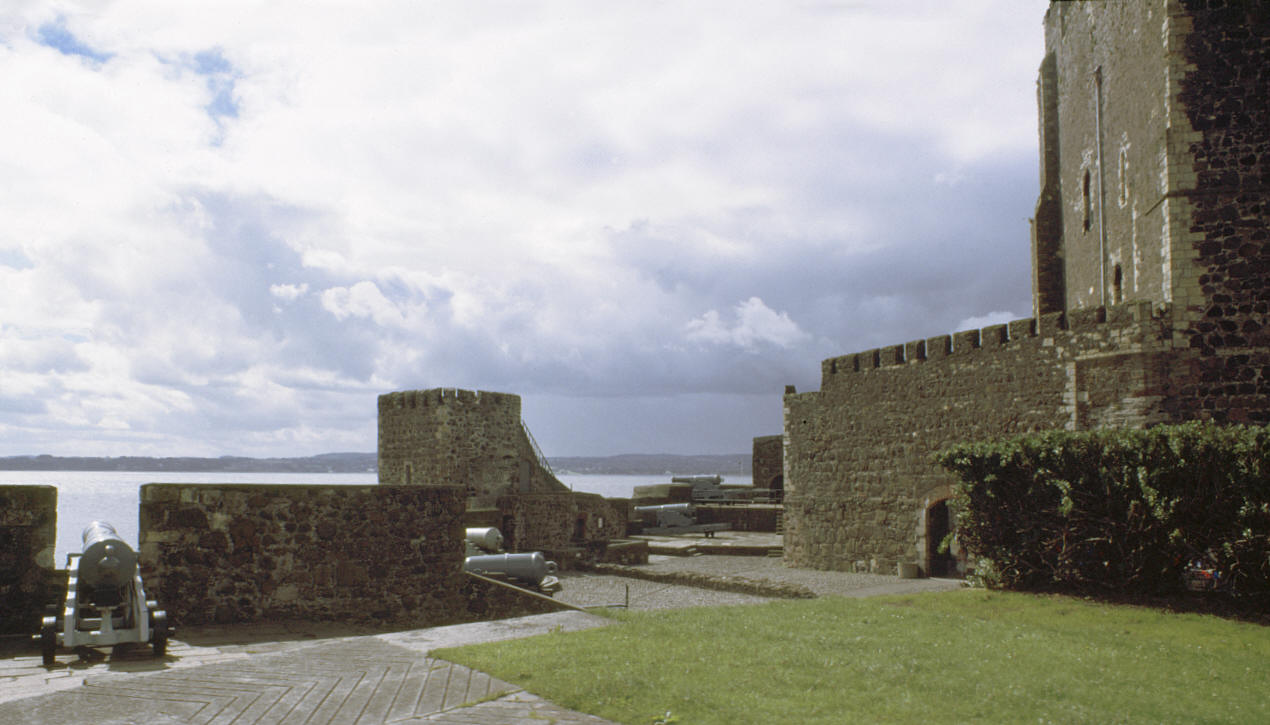
Looking out over Belfast Lough, where Drake prepared for battle, from Carrickfergus Castle

Even before the official entry of other nations, the American War of Independence was by no means confined to American soil; naval operations by both the Continental Navy and privateers ranged across the Atlantic. In 1777, American captains such as Lambert Wickes, Gustavus Conyngham, and William Day had been making raids into British waters and capturing merchant ships, which they took into French ports, even though France was officially neutral. Captain Day had even been accorded a gun salute by the French admiral at Brest.

Encouraged by such successes, and even more so by the American victory at the Battle of Saratoga that autumn, France signed two treaties with America in February 1778 but stopped just short of declaring war on Britain. The risk of a French attack forced the Royal Navy to concentrate its forces in the English Channel (La Manche), leaving other areas vulnerable.

Wickes and Day had shown that despite the narrowness of St. George's Channel and the North Channel, it was possible for single ships or very small squadrons to get into the Irish Sea and create havoc among the many vessels which traded between Great Britain and Ireland. John Paul Jones, on his first return to British waters as an enemy combatant, had a more ambitious plan: to take revenge for the targeting of American ports and ships by British forces by doing the same to British ports and ships.

With a single small Continental Navy sloop of war, the Ranger, Jones sailed from Brest on 10 April 1778, and headed for the coasts of the Solway Firth, where he had first learned to sail. Following an unsuccessful attempt to raid the port of Whitehaven in Cumberland, on the night of 17–18 April, he harassed shipping in the North Channel; then on the night of 20–21 April Ranger entered Belfast Lough with the intention of seizing a Royal Navy ship moored off Carrickfergus, HMS Drake. Unsuccessful, he returned to Whitehaven and achieved another objective, landing a large party at the harbour on the night of 22–23 April, and setting fire to a merchant ship. This raid was followed within hours by another, at the Scottish seashore mansion of the Earl of Selkirk, near Kirkcudbright. Even as the news of those deeds was racing to alert Britain's defences, Ranger was on the way back to Carrickfergus.

== Battle ==
Jones's crew had been recruited by being offered the opportunity to "make their Fortunes", a goal that could be achieved by privateering operations against British merchant shipping. But more British merchantmen had been sunk on the mission than captured, to avoid diverting crew members to sailing the prizes to France. The crew blamed Jones for what appeared to be a tactical error that allowed a British customs vessel to escape after being fired on by Ranger. Now he was intent on capturing a Royal Navy ship from its moorings, although it carried no cargo that could be sold for a handsome profit to his crew's benefit. According to Jones, "I ran a great risk of being killed or thrown in the sea". The crew was reluctant, and the state of the wind and tide would have made it difficult to enter the harbour. But it soon appeared that they might not have to visit Carrickfergus after all, as Drake was preparing to leave port, which revived the Americans' flagging spirits.

In fact, Drake had been preparing for action since the previous visit by Ranger, taking on volunteers from the Carrickfergus area to boost the crew from 100 to about 160, many of them landsmen who were to be used only for close-quarters combat, although there was a shortage of ammunition. Absent from the ship's company at this crucial time were the gunner, master's mate, boatswain, and lieutenant. Aging Captain George Burdon was later reported to have been in poor health. Drake got under way about 8 am, but with wind and tide against it, she made little progress. After an hour or so a boat was therefore sent to get a closer look at the intruder. Jones opted to try a slight variant of the plan which had failed to capture the customs vessel a few days earlier; hiding most of the crew and the big guns. This time it worked; the crew of the reconnaissance boat was captured, and this success raised the morale of the Americans. One of the prisoners revealed the large number of volunteers who had gone aboard Drake.

The approximate courses of the opponents up to the moment just before the first shots

About 1 pm, as Drake moved sluggishly out across Belfast Lough, a small boat came out to her, carrying another volunteer, Royal Navy Lieutenant William Dobbs, a local man who had just gotten married. According to Drake's pilot he brought with him a copy of an express letter from Whitehaven, explaining the full details of the mystery ship (Jones states in his official report that the news from Whitehaven had arrived the previous evening and was known to his morning captives). With the wind and tide more favourable in the afternoon, Ranger moved slowly back out of the Lough into the North Channel, making sure never to get too far ahead of Drake. At about 6 pm, the two ships were within hailing distance. Jones had the American naval colours flying, and Dobbs' formal inquiry as to the ship's identity was answered honestly.

The North Channel naval duel was in some respects a small-scale dress-rehearsal, in reverse, for Jones's 1779 battle with HMS Serapis. Drake had been built as a merchant ship with defensive capability and bought by the Royal Navy to help fill the gap left when many ships had to be sent to America; even the 20 four-pound guns were not official Navy issue but were her armament as a merchant vessel. The hull was the wrong shape for rapid battle manoeuvres and not designed to resist cannon fire. Ranger had been built as a fighting ship and modified by Jones for maximum efficiency: for example, although there were ports for 20 guns, he found it safest to install only 18 six-pound guns. That made for a total broadside weight of 54 pounds, slightly more than Drake's 40 pounds total. But those dozens of Irish volunteers meant that if Drake could grapple and board Ranger the Americans would be in trouble.

The formalities completed, Ranger turned sharply and fired a broadside at the following Drake. Drake was unable to reply immediately; when she did, she found she had a serious problem. With full charges of powder, the four-pounders were unstable and tended to tip forward; in the case of the two pairs of guns at the rear of the ship, most subject to the rise and fall with the waves, this meant that the ship could skid almost anywhere as they were fired, presenting grave danger to the gun crews. In Navy records, Drake's armament had been listed as 16 guns, suggesting that the rearmost guns had been left aboard just for show. The ship's gunner may well have known of these problems, and perhaps the gunner's mate too, but neither was aboard the Drake anymore (the mate having been captured in the reconnaissance mission, and the gunner was ill at Portsmouth).

After a few more broadsides, further problems emerged. Shrapnel from Ranger's third broadside hit Dobbs in the head, badly injuring him. Conditions on Drake's gun deck were so unpredictable that the "powder monkeys"—the boys who brought charges of gunpowder up for the great guns, in fire-resistant boxes—eventually became reluctant to do their duty. Twice the ship's master had to go below to urge the acting gunner to be more efficient in supplying the powder, when opportunities for broadsides were missed. Another problem was that the "slow matches" which were used to fire the guns kept falling into their fire-safety tubs and going out. The four-pound guns could not penetrate Ranger's toughened hull, so Drake tried copying the technique the Americans had been using from the start: they aimed at the masts, sails and rigging, in order to slow the opponent down.

The combatants were very close together but never close enough for grappling, probably because Jones knew of the extra men hidden below decks on Drake. As well as the great guns, both sides were firing small arms at each other, and here, too, Drake was at a disadvantage. The ship's magazine lacked cartridge paper; and when the musketeers ran out of cartridges, they had to laboriously load their guns by pouring in the right amount of powder, then putting in the shot. Musket balls were passed round in the armourer's hat, and two powder horns were shared between all the men on duty. With the other side much better organised, such inefficiency meant the difference between life and death. Drake killed just one of Jones's crew, Lieutenant Samuel Wallingford, by musket fire; another two—who were firing from positions in the mast tops—died as the by-product of a broadside. Just under an hour into the fight, Captain Burdon was struck in the head and killed by a musket ball. Another four of Drake's crew were killed. With both the captain and lieutenant out of action, command of Drake passed to the master, John Walsh.

By that time, Drake's sails and rigging had been reduced to tatters by Ranger's broadsides, and even the masts and yardarms were seriously damaged; in the light wind, the sloop was more or less immobilised, not even able to turn to aim a broadside. Unable to load fast enough, the small-arms fighters had retreated to cover, so only about a dozen people were left on Drake's main deck. A few minutes after Burdon died, the two remaining petty officers on deck went to the master and advised him that they should strike their colours and surrender; after further consultation, he agreed. The colours had already been shot away, so Walsh had to shout and wave his hat instead. According to Jones's records, the duel lasted one hour and five minutes.

== Aftermath ==
Thirty-five men were sent from Ranger to Drake to take charge and assess the damage; and the next three days were spent making repairs, while moving slowly northwestward between Ireland and Scotland. A cargo brig which came too close was captured and was used as extra accommodations. Six Irish fisherman who had been captured on the first Carrickfergus expedition were allowed to take a boat and go home, taking with them three sick Irish sailors, a present of sails from Drake, and money from Jones. On their return they reported the concern Jones was showing for Dobbs, who remained gravely injured. Meanwhile, the Royal Navy had sent out several larger warships in pursuit. Despite Drake's lameness, they never caught a glimpse of the slowly escaping Americans. The only real trouble Jones had was with his Lieutenant, Thomas Simpson, who had command of the Drake and at one point on the voyage sailed out of sight.

The news of the battle reached France much faster than Jones did, and the Americans were welcomed as heroes. In response to the battle, several British militia units were hastily redeployed to coastal areas. Local seaports also equipped themselves with artillery to defend themselves against further raids and the gentry banded together in volunteer battalions to support the militia. Thenceforward, the British press paid very close attention to every move Jones made; struggling to reconcile the malicious rumours of his murders and piracy with the evidence of his chivalrous and far from bloodthirsty behaviour on the Ranger mission.

== Sources ==
- Bradbury, David "Captain Jones's Irish Sea Cruize", Whitehaven UK, Past Presented, 2005, ISBN 978-1-904367-22-2
- Sawtelle, Joseph G. (Ed.) "John Paul Jones and the Ranger", Portsmouth NH, Portsmouth marine Society, 1994, ISBN 0-915819-19-8. This book contains the full log of the 1777–1778 voyage, the diary of surgeon Ezra Green, and many relevant letters by Jones and others.
- Bradford, James (Ed) "The Papers of John Paul Jones" microfilm edition, ProQuest (Chadwyck-Healey), 1986. This ten-microfilm set includes all known papers by or to Jones, including letters, reports, accounts, rosters, and ship logs.
