= Arbigland =

Scottish estate

Designations

Inventory of Gardens and Designed Landscapes in Scotland
- Official name: Arbigland
- Designated: 30 June 1987
- Reference no.: GDL00015

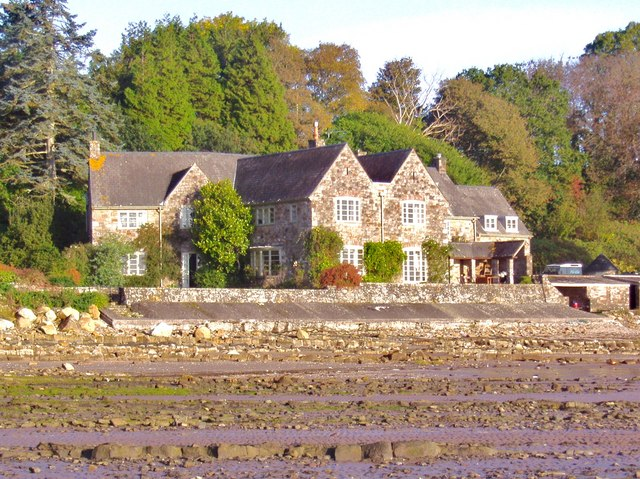
The House on the Shore, Arbigland

Arbigland is a coastal agricultural estate with holiday cottages in the historical county of Kirkcudbrightshire, Dumfries and Galloway, Scotland. It lies on the coast of the Solway Firth, to the south-east of Kirkbean. It is the birthplace of John Paul Jones, the United States' first well-known naval commander in the American Revolutionary War. There is a birthplace museum in the cottage where he was born, donated by the Blackett family to the John Paul Jones Museum Trust in 1997.

The estate is best known for agricultural innovation stemming back to the agricultural revolution when farms were laid out by the agricultural improver William Craik. It is currently run as a regenerative dairy operation plus arable and part of the estate has been re-wilded.

== Classical mansion ==
The classical-styled 10,796 square feet (1,003.0 m^{2}) Arbigland House was built in 1755 by the improving laird and gentleman architect William Craik (1703–98). His daughter - the poet and novelist Helen Craik (1751–1825), lived there until 1792. She was a friend and supporter of Robert Burns, who dined at the House. William's illegitimate son, James Craik, was the first Physician General of the United States Army and personal physician of George Washington. It is a Category A listed building.

== Gardens ==
The gardens have been included in the Inventory of Gardens and Designed Landscapes in Scotland. They were laid out in the 19th and 20th century by the Blackett family who bought the estate from the Craiks in 1852. Arbigland House and Gardens were sold in 2000 but the rest of the estate is still owned by the Blackett family and currently run by the writer Jamie Blackett. The estate features in his books, Red Rag to a Bull and Land of Milk and Honey.
