= Kirkbean =

Scottish seaside village

Coordinates: 54.916°N 3.597°W

Kirkbean: Scottish Gaelic: Cille Bheathain
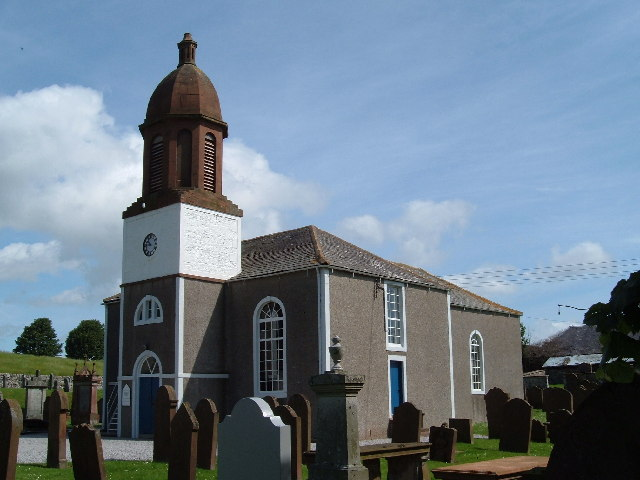
- Kirkbean Church

- Location within Dumfries and Galloway
- Population: 643 (2001 Census)
- OS grid reference: NX978592
- Council area: Dumfries and Galloway
- Lieutenancy area: Dumfries
- Country: Scotland
- Sovereign state: United Kingdom
- Police: Scotland
- Fire: Scottish
- Ambulance: Scottish

Kirkbean (Scottish Gaelic: Cille Bheathain) is a Scottish village and civil parish on the Solway Firth, in the historic county of Kirkcudbrightshire and council area of Dumfries and Galloway. In the 2001 census, the four small villages making up the parish of Kirkbean had a total population of 643. It includes the hamlet of Loaningfoot.

== History ==
The parish was the departure point for thousands of Scots seeking a better life in the American and Australian colonies during the late 18th and early 19th centuries. Convicts were also transported to Australia from here. This has made Kirkbean a rich source of genealogical history.

Kirkbean was one of five parishes from Kirkcudbrightshire included in the Nithsdale district of Dumfries and Galloway under the local government reforms of 1975 which abolished Kirkcudbrightshire as an administrative county. The parish has therefore been included in the Dumfries lieutenancy area since 1975.

=== Notable residents ===
In birth order:

- John Campbell (1720–1790), a notable seafarer, was born in the village. He became a British naval officer, a navigation expert, and colonial governor of Newfoundland, now a province of Canada.
- James Craik (/kreɪk/; c. 1727–1814) was Physician General (precursor of the Surgeon General) of the United States Army, while being George Washington's personal physician and close friend.
- John Paul Jones (1747–1792), founder of the United States Navy and a rear admiral in the Imperial Russian Navy, was born on the Arbigland estate. There is a memorial font to him in the church by sculptor George Henry Paulin, which depicts USS Bonhomme Richard.
- Helen Craik (c. 1751–1825), a poet, novelist and correspondent of Robert Burns, was born at Arbigland.
- Jean Thurot (1755–1833), son of François Thurot, a French naval commodore and privateer, was buried in Kirkbean cemetery.
- William Stewart Ross (1844–1906), a writer and publisher, was born in Kirkbean. He was a noted secularist thinker, who used the pseudonym Saladin.
- Sir James Gunn (1893–1964), artist, lived with his family in Carsethorn during World War II.

== Natural heritage ==
The local beaches and the bird-rich merse (salt marsh), where large numbers of seabirds live or over-winter, are part of the natural heritage of the parish. Visitors to the National Nature Reserve on the far side of the River Nith come to watch birds on the Carsethorn foreshore, before continuing to the nature reserves at Southwick and Mersehead.

The upper tower of Kirkbean Church was added in 1835. It was refurbished in Victorian style at the end of the 19th century. It was the oldest church in the combined parish of Colvend, Southwick and Kirkbean before it closed for public services in November 2010. It now serves as a private dwelling.

The village has an official community website.
