= Encyclopedia of American Biography =

Reference on notable figures first published in 1974

The Encyclopedia of American Biography, is a biographical encyclopedia, edited by John A. Garraty (ed.) and Jerome L. Sternstein (assoc. ed.) This 1,241-page encyclopedia, published by Harper & Row in 1974, "is more than a storehouse of information. It is also a compendium of informed opinion intended to aid readers who want to know the whys, not merely the whats, about the significant figures of our history." The summary of each life, which sticks to the facts, is followed by brief article "...attempting to explain why the individual is notable and to provide some sense of what he or she was like as a human being." The Introduction explains the rationale and process behind the creation of the book, including the way the essayists were chosen and the way the editors handled those essays.
