= List of shipwrecks in 1777 =

The List of shipwrecks in 1777 includes some ships sunk, wrecked or otherwise lost during 1777.

table of contents
1777
Jan	Feb	Mar	Apr
May	Jun	Jul	Aug
Sep	Oct	Nov	Dec
Unknown date

== January ==
=== 2 January ===
List of shipwrecks: 2 January 1777
Ship	State	Description
Hughes	Great Britain	The ship was driven ashore near Toulon, France. She was on a voyage from Cap François, Saint-Domingue to Marseille.

=== 6 January ===
List of shipwrecks: 6 January 1777
Ship	State	Description
Bonetta	Great Britain	The ship foundered. She was on a voyage from Londonderry, Ireland to London.

=== 15 January ===
List of shipwrecks: 15 January 1777
Ship	State	Description
Catharine	Great Britain	The ship was lost near Milford, Pembrokeshire. She was on a voyage from Bristol, England, to Dublin, Ireland.

=== 31 January ===
List of shipwrecks: 31 January 1777
Ship	State	Description
Conference	Great Britain	The ship was wrecked on a reef off Grenville, Grenada. She was on a voyage from London to Grenada.

=== Unknown Date ===
List of shipwrecks: Unknown Date 1777
Ship	State	Description
Henry	Ireland	The ship was lost at Saint-Martins, near Bordeaux, France with the loss of all but one of her crew. She was on a voyage from Dungarvan, County Antrim to Bordeaux.
Lark	Great Britain	The ship was wrecked on the Isle of May.
Maria Louise	Spain	The ship was lost near Tortosa. She was on a voyage from Barcelona to Dunkirk, France.
Normande	France	The ship was driven ashore and wrecked at Bengal with the loss of two lives.
St Mary	Ireland	The ship was driven ashore near Dungarvan. She was on a voyage from St. Ubes, Portugal to Waterford.
Thames	Great Britain	The ship was driven ashore at Saltcoats, Ayrshire. She was on a voyage from Liverpool, Lancashire to London.
William	Great Britain	The ship was lost near Dublin, Kingdom of Ireland. She was on a voyage from London to Dublin.

== February ==
=== 14 February ===
List of shipwrecks: 14 February 1777
Ship	State	Description
Hope	United States	American Revolutionary War: The vessel was captured by HMS Emerald (Royal Navy) and burned off Cape Henry.
Molly	United States	American Revolutionary War: The vessel was captured by HMS Phoenix (Royal Navy) and burned off Cape Henry.

=== 18 February ===
List of shipwrecks: 18 February 1777
Ship	State	Description
Alexander	United States	American Revolutionary War: The vessel was captured by HMS Phoenix (Royal Navy) and burned off Cape Henry.

=== 20 February ===
List of shipwrecks: 20 February 1777
Ship	State	Description
Neptune	Great Britain	The ship was lost at St. Lucar, Spain. Her crew were rescued. She was on a voyage from Dartmouth, Devon to St. Lucar.

=== 24 February ===
List of shipwrecks: 24 February 1777
Ship	State	Description
Hunter	Great Britain	The ship struck a rock off the Isles of Scilly. She foundered the next day. She was on a voyage from Lisbon, Portugal to London.

=== 27 February ===
List of shipwrecks: 27 February 1777
Ship	State	Description
Nancy	United States	American Revolutionary War: The vessel was captured by HMS Phoenix (Royal Navy) and scuttled off Cape Henry.

=== Unknown date ===
List of shipwrecks: Unknown date 1777
Ship	State	Description
Elizabeth	Great Britain	The ship was driven ashore near Workington, Cumberland. She was on a voyage from Whitehaven, Cumberland to Jamaica.
Joseph	Great Britain	The ship was driven ashore near Weymouth, Dorset. She was on a voyage from Plymouth, Devon to Jamaica. She was later refloated.
Marquis of Pomball	Great Britain	The ship was driven ashore in the Western Islands. She was on a voyage from Jamaica to the Western Islands and London.
Peggy	Great Britain	The ship foundered in Liverpool Bay off Crosby Point, Lancashire with the loss of most of her crew. She was on a voyage from Liverpool, Lancashire to Newry, County Antrim, Ireland.

== March ==
=== 4 March ===
List of shipwrecks: 4 March 1777
Ship	State	Description
Hibernia	Great Britain	The ship was lost near Kinsale, County Cork, Ireland. She was on a voyage from Bristol, Gloucestershire to Cork.

=== 17 March ===
List of shipwrecks: 17 March 1777
Ship	State	Description
Relief	Ireland	The ship was destroyed by fire. She was about do depart from British Honduras for Cork.

=== 20 March ===
List of shipwrecks: 20 March 1777
Ship	State	Description
Unknown	Royal Navy	American Revolutionary War:The tender of HMS Enterprize (Royal Navy) was captured and burned by USS Revenge (United States Navy).

=== 28 March ===
List of shipwrecks: 28 March 1777
Ship	State	Description
Elizabeth	Great Britain	The ship was wrecked on a rock in the Leith of Dronton.

=== Unknown date ===
List of shipwrecks: Unknown date 1777
Ship	State	Description
Comte d'Artois	France	The ship was driven ashore at Dunkirk. She was on a voyage from Jamaica to Dunkirk. She broke into three on 29 March.
Dolphin	Great Britain	The ship was wrecked on the Barbary Coast.
Hibernia	Ireland	The ship was lost near Kinsale, County Cork. She was on a voyage from Bristol, Gloucestershire, Great Britain to Cork.
Jane & Jesse	Great Britain	The ship was driven ashore at Crosby, Lancashire. She was on a voyage from Liverpool, Lancashire to Sligo, Ireland.
Northam	Great Britain	The victualling ship was captured and sunk in the Atlantic Ocean by the privateer Lexington (United States).
Polly	Great Britain	The ship was driven ashore near Calais, France. She was on a voyage from Newcastle upon Tyne, Northumberland to Pool, Dorset.
Prosperous	Great Britain	The ship was lost in Bigbury Bay. Her crew were rescued. She was on a voyage from Barnstaple, Devon to Southampton, Hampshire.
Recovery	Great Britain	The ship was lost near Montrose, Forfarshire with the loss of two of her crew.
Reinholds	Great Britain	The ship ran aground in the River Ribble and was severely damaged. She was on a voyage from Jamaica to Lancaster, Lancashire.
Sampson	Ireland	The ship was driven ashore near Dungarvan, County Antrim. She was on a voyage from Dungarvan to Bordeaux, France.
Sea Nymph	Great Britain	The stores ship was driven ashore on the coast of France. She was on a voyage from Cork to Deptford, Kent.

== April ==
=== 1 April ===
List of shipwrecks: 1 April 1777
Ship	State	Description
Unknown	United States	American Revolutionary War:The vessel was destroyed by frigate HMS Tartar (Royal Navy) off the New Jersey coast.

=== 12 April ===
List of shipwrecks: 12 April 1777
Ship	State	Description
Molly	Ireland	The ship was driven ashore 3 nautical miles (5.6 km) north of Whitehaven, Cumberland, Great Britain.

=== 23 April ===
List of shipwrecks: 23 April 1777
Ship	State	Description
Bee	Great Britain	The sloop was lost 4 nautical miles (7.4 km) west of Beaumaris, Anglesey with the loss of all but her captain.
Jean	France	The ship was lost in the Orkney Islands, Great Britain. She was on a voyage from "N. Faro" to Dunkirk.

=== 29 April ===
List of shipwrecks: 29 April 1777
Ship	State	Description
Juffrow Baukien	Hamburg	The galiot was wrecked near Bolt Head, Devon, Great Britain. She was on a voyage from Bordeaux, France to Hamburg.

=== Unknown date ===
List of shipwrecks: Unknown date 1777
Ship	State	Description
Aleda	Dutch Republic	The ship foundered. Her crew were rescued by Hunter (Great Britain). Aleda was on a voyage from St. Ubes, Portugal to Elsinore, Denmark.
Draper	Ireland	The ship was driven ashore north of Killough, County Down.
Expedition	Great Britain	The ship was lost near Penzance, Cornwall. Her crew were rescued. She was on a voyage from Bristol, Gloucestershire to Venice.
Friends Endeavour	Great Britain	The ship was lost in Witsand Bay. Her crew were rescued. She was on a voyage from Biddiford, Devon to London.
Hawke	Great Britain	The ship was wrecked on the Burbo Bank, in Liverpool Bay. She was on a voyage from Liverpool, Lancashire to Dublin, Ireland.
Joseph	Spain	The ship was wrecked in the Isles of Scilly, Great Britain with the loss of all hands. She was on a voyage from Bilbao to Exeter, Devon, Great Britain.
Lecresie Elysabet	Great Britain	The ship was driven ashore and wrecked on the coast of Norfolk, Great Britain. She was on a voyage from Arkhangelsk, Russia to Bordeaux.
St. Joseph	France	The ship was driven ashore at Saint-Valery-sur-Somme. She was on a voyage from L'Orient to Dunkirk.
Three Sisters	Great Britain	The ship was lost whilst on a voyage from Liverpool to a Baltic port.
Two Brothers	Great Britain	The ship was lost near Pool, Dorset with the loss of all hands. She was on a voyage from a Dutch port to Pool.
Unknown	United States	American Revolutionary War:The schooner was destroyed at Egg Harbor, New Jersey by HMS Mermaid (Royal Navy) between the 21st and 28th.

== May ==
=== 26 May ===
List of shipwrecks: 26 May 1777
Ship	State	Description
Marquis of Rockingham	British East India Company	This East Indiaman was wrecked on a rock 5 nautical miles (9.3 km) off Mahabalipuram, India.

=== Unknown date ===
List of shipwrecks: Unknown date 1777
Ship	State	Description
Apollo	Great Britain	The ship was lost at Memel, Prussia.
Aurora	Great Britain	The ship was driven ashore near Gothenburg, Sweden. She was on a voyage from London to Memel.
Camilla	Great Britain	The ship was driven ashore and wrecked on Hispaniola in early May. She was on a voyage from Africa to the Musquita Shore.
Carolina	Great Britain	The ship was lost at Memel.
City of London	Great Britain	The ship was lost at Memel.
Freedom	Great Britain	The whaler was last sighted in late May. Presumed foundered with the loss of all hands.
Spencer	Great Britain	The ship was lost at Memel.
Two Brothers	Great Britain	The ship was lost at Memel.

== June ==
=== 4 June ===
List of shipwrecks: 4 June 1777
Ship	State	Description
Grandvale	Great Britain	The ship ran aground on the coast of Scotland and was wrecked. She was on a voyage from Jamaica to Glasgow, Renfrewshire.

=== 14 June ===
List of shipwrecks: 14 June 1777
Ship	State	Description
Union	United States	American Revolution: The captured British privateer ran aground while being chased by Royal Navy ships at Stono Inlet, South Carolina. A boarding party burned her.

=== 19 June ===
List of shipwrecks: 19 June 1777
Ship	State	Description
Expedition	Great Britain	American Revolutionary War: The ship was captured and sunk by an American privateer. She was on a voyage from Whitehaven, Cumberland to Norway.
Merrin	Great Britain	American Revolutionary War: The ship was captured and sunk by an American privateer. She was on a voyage from Greenock, Renfrewshire to "Suna".

=== 20 January ===
List of shipwrecks: 20 January 1777
Ship	State	Description
Jenny and Peggy	Great Britain	American Revolutionary War: The ship was captured and sunk by an American privateer.

=== 22 June ===
List of shipwrecks: 22 June 1777
Ship	State	Description
Favourite	Great Britain	American Revolutionary War: The ship was captured and sunk by an American privateer. She was on a voyage from Maryport, Cumberland to Dublin, Ireland.
Greystock	Great Britain	American Revolutionary War: The ship was captured and sunk by an American privateer. She was on a voyage from Workington, Cumberland to Dublin.
Richard	Great Britain	American Revolutionary War: The ship was captured and sunk by an American privateer. She was on a voyage from Whitehaven, Cumberland to Dublin.

=== 22 June ===
List of shipwrecks: 22 June 1777
Ship	State	Description
	United States	American Revolutionary War: The sloop was captured by HMS Emerald (Royal Navy) and burned off Cape Henry.

=== 30 June ===
List of shipwrecks: 30 June 1777
Ship	State	Description
	United States	American Revolutionary War: The brig was captured by HMS Emerald (Royal Navy) and burned off Cape Henry.

=== Unknown date ===
List of shipwrecks: Unknown date 1777
Ship	State	Description
Betsey	Great Britain	The ship was lost at Memel, Prussia.
Mary Ann	Great Britain	The ship struck the Tuskar Rock and foundered. She was on a voyage from Tortola to Liverpool, Lancashire.
Regard	Great Britain	The ship was lost whilst on a voyage from Memel and Königsberg, Prussia to Bristol, Gloucestershire.

== July ==
=== 10 July ===
List of shipwrecks: 10 July 1777
Ship	State	Description
Betsy	United States	American Revolutionary War: The vessel was captured by HMS Emerald (Royal Navy) and scuttled off Cape Henry.
James	Great Britain	American Revolutionary War: The ship was captured and sunk by the Privateer General Misslin (United States). She was on a voyage from Glasgow, Renfrewshire to Porto, Portugal.

=== 18 July ===
List of shipwrecks: 18 July 1777
Ship	State	Description
Mark Antonio	Spain	The privateer was wrecked off Bermuda. She was on a voyage from Sint Eustatius to Cape Henlopen, Delaware, United States.

=== 20 July ===
List of shipwrecks: 20 July 1777
Ship	State	Description
Sally	United States	American Revolutionary War: The vessel was captured by HMS Emerald (Royal Navy) and scuttled off Cape Henry.

=== 31 July ===
List of shipwrecks: 31 July 1777
Ship	State	Description
Fancy	United States	American Revolutionary War: The privateer was engaged by HMS Foudroyant ( (Kingdom of Great Britain) Royal Navy). She was driven ashore at Penzance, Cornwall, Great Britain. Fancy was subsequently refloated.

=== Unknown date ===
List of shipwrecks: Unknown date 1777
Ship	State	Description
Maria	Great Britain	American Revolutionary War: The ship was captured and burnt by an American privateer.
Nancy	Great Britain	The ship was lost near Dragør, Denmark. She was on a voyage from Danzig to London.
Sally	Great Britain	The ship was lost near Cape Non, Morocco. There were thirteen survivors.

== August ==
=== 5 August ===
List of shipwrecks: 5 August 1777
Ship	State	Description
Rak (Рак, 'Crayfish')	Imperial Russian Navy	The transport ship was driven ashore and wrecked at the Dolgaya Spit in the Sea of Azov. She was on a voyage from Yenikale to Taganrog.

=== 27 August ===
List of shipwrecks: 27 August 1777
Ship	State	Description
Unnamed	Great Britain	American Revolutionary War: The British (unclear if Navy) pinnace was captured by the Princess Anne Militia off Cape Henry but was wrecked ashore.

=== 31 August ===
List of shipwrecks: 31 August 1777
Ship	State	Description
John and Sarah	Great Britain	The ship was lost at King's Lynn, Norfolk with the loss of three of her crew.

=== Unknown date ===
List of shipwrecks: Unknown date 1777
Ship	State	Description
Fanny	Great Britain	American Revolutionary War: The ship was captured and burnt by the privateer Tartar (United States). She was on a voyage from Christiania, Norway to Berwick upon Tweed.
Nancy	Great Britain	The ship was driven ashore at "Bullen". She was on a voyage from Riga, Russia to Liverpool, Lancashire.
Patsy	Great Britain	The ship was driven ashore near Liverpool. She was on a voyage from Jamaica to Liverpool.
Thomas and Elizabeth	Great Britain	American Revolutionary War: The ship was captured and burnt by the privateer Tartar (United States). She was on a voyage from Saint Petersburg, Russia to Leith, Lothian.

== September ==
=== 4 September ===
List of shipwrecks: 4 September 1777
Ship	State	Description
Kuryer (Курьер, 'Courier')	Imperial Russian Navy	The ship was driven ashore and wrecked near Sevastopol with the loss of 23 of her crew.

=== 10 September ===
List of shipwrecks: 10 September 1777
Ship	State	Description
Ariadne	Great Britain	The ship foundered in the Atlantic Ocean. All on board were rescued. She was on a voyage from Dominica to London.
Chesma (Чесма)	Imperial Russian Navy	The galley was driven ashore by a storm surge at Kronstadt.
Lemnos (Лемнос)	Imperial Russian Navy	The galley was driven ashore by a storm surge at Kronstadt.
Saturn (Сатурн)	Imperial Russian Navy	The pink was driven aground by a storm surge at Kronstadt.
Yevstafy (Евстафий, 'Eustathios')	Imperial Russian Navy	The frigate was driven ashore by a storm surge at Kronstadt.
Yevstafy (Евстафий, 'Eustathios')	Imperial Russian Navy	The pink was driven ashore by a storm surge at Kronstadt.
Two unnamed vessels	Russia	The galiots were driven ashore and wrecked in a storm surge at Kronstadt.

=== 26 September ===
List of shipwrecks: 26 September 1777
Ship	State	Description
USS Delaware	(United States) Continental Navy	American Revolutionary War: The frigate ran aground at Philadelphia, Pennsylvania. She was consequently captured by the British and entered service with the Royal Navy.

=== Unknown date ===
List of shipwrecks: Unknown date 1777
Ship	State	Description
Britannia	Great Britain	The ship was lost near Ameland, Dutch Republic. She was on a voyage from Saint Petersburg, Russia to Exeter, Devon.
Catharine	Great Britain	The ship foundered in the Øresund. She was on a voyage from Stockholm, Sweden to Leith, Lothian.
Good-Intent	Great Britain	The ship foundered whilst on a voyage from Stettin to London.
Henry	Ireland	The ship was lost on the Dutch coast. She was on a voyage from Saint Petersburg to Dublin.
John	Great Britain	The ship was lost on the Dutch coast with the loss of three of her crew. She was on a voyage from Saint Petersburg to London.
Le Bon Père	France	The ship was wrecked on the Goodwin Sands, Kent, Great Britain. Her crew were rescued. She was on a voyage from La Rochelle to Dunkirk.
Property	Great Britain	The ship was destroyed by fire in the English Channel off the Isle of Wight. Her crew were rescued. She was on a voyage from London to Ilfracombe, Devon.
Squirrel	Great Britain	The ship ran aground and was severely damaged in the River Thames. She was on a voyage from Saint Petersburg to London.
Union	Great Britain	The ship ran aground in the River Foyle at Londonderry, Ireland. She was on a voyage from Saint Petersburg to Londonderry.

== October ==
=== 1 October ===
List of shipwrecks: 1 October 1777
Ship	State	Description
USS Reprisal	(United States) Continental Navy	The brig foundered in the Grand Banks of Newfoundland with the loss of all but one of the 129 people on board.

=== 5 October ===
List of shipwrecks: 5 October 1777
Ship	State	Description
Unknown	United States	American Revolutionary War:Two vessels were sunk as block ships in the Delaware River near Billingsport, New Jersey.

=== 6 October ===
List of shipwrecks: 6 October 1777
Ship	State	Description
USS Montgomery	(United States) Continental Navy	American Revolutionary War: The 24 gun frigate was set afire and destroyed in the Hudson River to prevent her capture by the British.

=== 9 October ===
List of shipwrecks: 9 October 1777
Ship	State	Description
Elizabeth	Ireland	The ship struck a rock and sank at Londonderry. She was later refloated. Elizabeth was on a voyage from Christiansand, Norway to Londonderry.

=== 22 October ===
List of shipwrecks: 22 October 1777
Ship	State	Description
HMS Augusta	Royal Navy	HMS Augusta and HMS Merlin. American Revolutionary War, Battle of Red Bank: The St Albans-class ship of the line ran aground and was subsequently destroyed by fire in the Delaware River with the loss of 150 of her 300 crew. The wreck was raised in 1867 and taken to Gloucester City, New Jersey.
HMS Merlin	Royal Navy	American Revolutionary War, Battle of Red Bank: The Sloop-of-War ran aground and subsequently caught fire in the Delaware River.

=== 29 October ===
List of shipwrecks: 29 October 1777
Ship	State	Description
Charlotte	Great Britain	The ship was driven ashore and sank at Plymouth, Devon. She was on a voyage from Plymouth to New York, United States.

=== 30 October ===
List of shipwrecks: 30 October 1777
Ship	State	Description
Two Brothers	Great Britain	The ship was driven ashore and wrecked at Penzance, Cornwall with the loss of eleven of her fourteen crew. She was on a voyage from Lisbon, Portugal to Amsterdam, Dutch Republic.
Vrow Dorothea	flag unknown	The ship was driven ashore on the south coast of the Isle of Wight, Great Britain. She was on a voyage from Bilbao, Spain to London, Great Britain.

=== Unknown date ===
List of shipwrecks: Unknown date 1777
Ship	State	Description
Brothers	Great Britain	The ship ran aground of the Tolhochen Reef. She was on a voyage from London to Saint Petersburg, Russia.
USS Congress	(United States) Continental Navy	American Revolutionary War: The frigate was set afire and destroyed in the Hudson River to prevent her capture by the British.
Hannah	Great Britain	The ship was wrecked on the Haisborough Sands, in the North Sea off the coast of Norfolk. She was on a voyage from Königsberg, Prussia to Colchester, Essex
Justitia	Sweden	The ship was driven ashore and wrecked at Blackpool, Lancashire, Great Britain with the loss of all but one of her crew. She was on a voyage from Sweden to Liverpool, Lancashire.
Killingsworth	Great Britain	The ship was lost in the Gulf of Finland. She was on a voyage from Saint Petersburg to London.
Lily	Great Britain	The ship was lost at Memel, Prussia.
Marquis of Granby	Great Britain	The ship was driven ashore at Dublin, Ireland. She was on a voyage from Great Yarmouth, Norfolk to Dublin.
Mary	Great Britain	The ship was lost at Memel.
Minerva	Great Britain	The ship was lost near Danzig. Her crew were rescued. She was on a voyage from Newcastle upon Tyne, Northumberland to Königsberg.
USS Mosquito	(United States) Continental Navy	American Revolutionary War: The sloop of war was destroyed in action in the Delaware River.
Peace & Plenty	Great Britain	The ship was driven ashore and wrecked near Stromness, Orkney Islands. She was on a voyage from a Baltic port to Liverpool, Lancashire.
Ruby	Great Britain	The ship was driven ashore and wrecked on Walney Island, Lancashire. She was on a voyage from Jamaica to Lancaster, Lancashire.
Two Brothers	Great Britain	The ship was lost at Memel.
Two Brothers	Great Britain	The ship was driven ashore and wrecked at Great Yarmouth. She was on a voyage from Königsberg to London.
Two Brothers	Ireland	The ship was driven ashore and wrecked on the coast of Scotland. She was on a voyage from Memel to Dublin.
William	Great Britain	The ship was lost in the Gulf of Finland. She was on a voyage from Saint Petersburg to Portsmouth, Hampshire.

== November ==
=== 2 November ===
List of shipwrecks: 2 November 1777
Ship	State	Description
USS Effingham	(United States) Continental Navy	American Revolutionary War: The incomplete frigate was scuttled at Bordentown, New Jersey to prevent capture by the British. Later refloated, of partly above water, but burned by the British in 1778.
USS Washington	(United States) Continental Navy	American Revolutionary War: The incomplete frigate was scuttled to prevent capture by the British. Later refloated, or partly above water, but burned by the British in 1778.

=== 7 November ===
List of shipwrecks: 7 November 1777
Ship	State	Description
HMS Syren	Royal Navy	The 28-gun Enterprise-class sixth-rate frigate was wrecked at Point Judith, Rhode Island.

=== 13 November ===
List of shipwrecks: 13 November 1777
Ship	State	Description
Sally	(Kingdom of Great Britain) Guernsey	The ship foundered in the English Channel off Kimmeridge, Dorset with the loss of all on board.

=== 17 November ===
List of shipwrecks: 17 November 1777
Ship	State	Description
USS Andrew Doria	(United States) Continental Navy	American Revolutionary War: The brig was scuttled at Red Bank, New Jersey.

=== 20 November ===
List of shipwrecks: 20 November 1777
Ship	State	Description
Hoffnung	Stettin	The ship was wrecked on the coast of Jutland. She was on a voyage from Stettin to Bordeaux, France.

=== 21 November ===
List of shipwrecks: 21 November 1777
Ship	State	Description
USS Champion	(United States) Continental Navy	American Revolutionary War: The xebec was set afire at Philadelphia, Pennsylvania to prevent her capture by the British.
Montgomery	United States	American Revolutionary War: The ship was burned.

=== 23 November ===
List of shipwrecks: 23 November 1777
Ship	State	Description
Moncreef	Great Britain	The ship was lost on Juet Island with the loss of all but one of her crew. She was on a voyage from Rotterdam, Dutch Republic to Leith, Lothian.

=== Unknown date ===
List of shipwrecks: Unknown date 1777
Ship	State	Description
Boston	Great Britain	The ship foundered in Swanage Bay. Her crew were rescued. She was on a voyage from Weymouth to Pool, Dorset.
City of Frankfort	Lübeck	The ship was lost in the Gulf of Finland with the loss of all hands. She was on a voyage from Lübeck to Saint Petersburg, Russia.
Euston	Great Britain	The collier was lost on the Gunfleet Sand, in the North Sea off the coast of Essex.
Friendship	Great Britain	The ship foundered off Lisbon, Portugal. Her crew were rescued. She was on a voyage from Cádiz, Spain to London.
Hearts of Gold	Great Britain	The collier was lost on the Gunfleet Sand.
Hunter	Great Britain	The collier was lost on the Gunfleet Sand.
John & Georefg	Great Britain	The collier was lost on the Gunfleet Sand.
Mary & Ann	Great Britain	The collier was lost on the Gunfleet Sand.
Mercey	Great Britain	The ship was wrecked on Siskar Island. She was on a voyage from Saint Petersburg to London.
Mercury	Great Britain	The collier was lost on the Gunfleet Sand.
Piercy	Great Britain	The collier was lost on the Gunfleet Sand.
Prince Edward	Great Britain	The collier was lost on the Gunfleet Sand.
Queen	Great Britain	The ship was driven ashore and wrecked at Arkhangelsk, Russia. She was on a voyage from Arhcangelsk to Liverpool, Lancashire.
Squirrel	Great Britain	The ship ran aground near "Carelseroon". She was on a voyage from Saint Petersburg, Russia to Borrowstounness, Lothian.
St. Michael	Ireland	The ship was driven ashore and wrecked at Ramsgate, Kent, Great Britain. She was on a voyage from London to Cork.
St. Trenion	Great Britain	The collier was lost on the Gunfleet Sand.
Susannah	Great Britain	The collier was lost on the Gunfleet Sand.
Tempest	Great Britain	The collier was lost on the Gunfleet Sand.
Tharkhill	Great Britain	The collier was lost on the Gunfleet Sand.
Thomas & Mary	Great Britain	The ship was wrecked at San Vicente, northern Spain. Her crew were rescued. She was on a voyage from Plymouth, Devon to St. Andero, Spain.
Venus	Ireland	The ship was driven ashore and wrecked in Ballyheige Bay, County Kerry. She was on a voyage from Porto, Portugal to Limerick.
Windsor	Great Britain	The ship was driven ashore and wrecked on the coast of Lincolnshire. She was on a voyage from "Wyburgh" to London.

== December ==
=== 3 December ===
List of shipwrecks: 3 December 1777
Ship	State	Description
Rover	United States	American Revolutionary War: The privateer was captured on 1 December and scuttled on the 3rd by HMS Sphynx (Royal Navy).

=== 10 December ===
List of shipwrecks: 10 December 1777
Ship	State	Description
Arc de Ciel	Kingdom of France	American Revolutionary War: The vessel was captured by HMS St Albans (Royal Navy) and destroyed in the Chesapeake Bay.
USS Schuyler	United States Navy Continental Navy	American Revolutionary War: Setauket Raid:The sloop of war was beached and sank while being pursued by HMS Falcon (Royal Navy) off Smithtown Bay near Setauket.
Two Friends	United Kingdom	American Revolutionary War:The armed sloop went ashore at Long Island Beach, near Barnegat, New Jersey. Possibly refloated and returned to service.

=== 13 December ===
List of shipwrecks: 13 December 1777
Ship	State	Description
Maria Johanna	Sweden	The ship struck the Lemon and Ower Sand, in the North Sea off the coast of Suffolk, Great Britain and foundered. Her crew survived. She was on a voyage from Gothenburg to the Strait of Gibraltar.

=== 15 December ===
List of shipwrecks: 15 December 1777
Ship	State	Description
Industry	Great Britain	The brigantine was wrecked on the Goodwin Sands, Kent with the loss of all hands.

=== 23 December ===
List of shipwrecks: 23 December 1777
Ship	State	Description
Pennsylvania	United States	The Privateer was wrecked on the rocks of Magilligan Point, east of entrance to Lough Foyle, Ireland. 45 crew drowned, 2 survivors.
HMS Sprightly	Royal Navy	Shipwreck of cutter of 12 guns 'Sprightly' capsized with loss of life, off Les Hanois reef west of Guernsey Channel Islands, whilst chasing a smuggler.

=== 24 December ===
List of shipwrecks: 24 December 1777
Ship	State	Description
Mercury	Great Britain	The vessel was lost on obstructions placed in the North River.

=== 31 December ===
List of shipwrecks: 31 December 1777
Ship	State	Description
Industry	Great Britain	American Revolutionary War:The armed schooner was captured, stripped and burned by Militia in the Delaware River between Philadelphia and Gloucester Point after breaking loose from her moorings by drifting ice.
John	Great Britain	American Revolutionary War:The brigantine was captured, stripped and destroyed by Militia in the Delaware River between Philadelphia and Gloucester Point after breaking loose from her moorings by drifting ice.
Lord Howe	Great Britain	American Revolutionary War:The transport was captured, stripped and burned by Militia between Philadelphia and Gloucester Point after breaking loose from her moorings by drifting ice.
Unknown		American Revolutionary War:The brig was shelled and blown up by Continental artillery in the Delaware River at Wilmington, Delaware.

=== Unknown date ===
List of shipwrecks: Unknown date 1777
Ship	State	Description
Alexandre Wilhelm	Denmark	The ship was driven ashore and wrecked on Læsø.
Ascension	Great Britain	The ship was driven ashore and wrecked near Rye, Sussex, Great Britain with the loss of two of her crew. She was on a voyage from Málaga to Ostend, Dutch Republic.
Britannia	Great Britain	The ship was driven ashore and wrecked 12 nautical miles (22 km) west of Campveer, Dutch Republic. She was on a voyage from Aberdyfi, Merionethshire to Rotterdam, Dutch Republic.
Carlton	Great Britain	The ship was lost whilst on a voyage from a Baltic port to Bristol, Gloucestershire.
Dorothea	Stettin	The ship was lost at Skagen, Denmark. She was on a voyage from Stettin to London, Great Britain.
Dorothy	Great Britain	The ship was lost off Skagen. She was on a voyage from Memel, Prussia to London.
USS Fly	(United States) Continental Navy	American Revolutionary War: The sloop of war was beached, set afire and destroyed in the Delaware River to prevent capture by the British.
Gibralter Paquet	Ireland	The ship was lost off Beerhaven. She was on a voyage from Bantry, County Cork to Lisbon, Portugal.
Handora	Dutch Republic	The ship ran aground on the Gunfleet Sand, in the North Sea off the coast of Essex, Great Britain. She was refloated but was found to be severely damaged. Handora was on a voyage from Sint Eustatius to Portsmouth, Hampshire and Amsterdam.
Henry	Great Britain	The ship was driven ashore at Great Yarmouth, Norfolk. She was on a voyage from Saint Petersburg, Russia to London.
Hoppit	Sweden	The ship was lost on the Dutch coast. She was on a voyage from Stockholm to Plymouth, Devon, Great Britain.
Juliana	Great Britain	The ship ran aground on the Hoyle Bank, in Liverpool Bay. She was on a voyage from Liverpool, Lancashire to Jamaica.
L'Amiable Marguerit	Great Britain	The ship was driven ashore near Kingsale, County Cork. She was on a voyage from Porto to Dublin.
Lily	Great Britain	The transport ship was wrecked on the Dutch coast.
Meanwell	Great Britain	The ship was wrecked on "Reissenteen Island" with the loss of two of her crew.
New London	Great Britain	The ship was driven ashore on "the Dollers". She was on a voyage from London to Stockholm.
Prince of Prussia	Great Britain	The ship was lost whilst on a voyage from London to Königsberg, Prussia.
USS Sachem	(United States) Continental Navy	American Revolutionary War: The sloop of war was scuttled in the Delaware River to prevent capture by the British.
Russia Merchant	Great Britain	The ship was wrecked on Læsø. She was on a voyage from Saint Petersburg to Bristol.
Swallow	Great Britain	The ship struck rocks in the Cattewater and was wrecked.
Townsend	Great Britain	The ship was lost on the Welsh coast. She was on a voyage from Ireland to Swansey, Glamorgan.
USS Wasp	(United States) Continental Navy	American Revolutionary War: The schooner was beached, set afire and destroyed in the Delaware River to prevent capture by the British.

== Unknown date ==
List of shipwrecks: Unknown date 1777
Ship	State	Description
Beverley	Great Britain	The transport ship foundered in the Atlantic Ocean. Her crew were rescued by HMS Amazon ( (Kingdom of Great Britain) Royal Navy). Beverley was on a voyage from Halifax, Nova Scotia, British America to New York, United States.
Chatham	Great Britain	The transport ship foundered in the Atlantic Ocean. Her crew were rescued by Stag (Great Britain). Chatham was on a voyage from New York to London.
Codroy	Great Britain	The ship was lost at Newfoundland, British America. She was on a voyage from Halifax to Newfoundland.
Diamond	Ireland	American Revolutionary War: The ship struck a cheval de frise and sank at New York. She was on a voyage from Cork to Antigua and New York.
Diana	Great Britain	The ship was lost whilst on a voyage from Jamaica to London.
Experience	France	The ship was lost on the Île de France, Mauritius. She was on a voyage from L'Orient to Mauritius.
Glaudina	Great Britain	The ship was wrecked on the coast of Florida, British America. She was on a voyage from London to Pensacola, Florida.
Gloucester	United States	The Privateer vanished after leaving port.
Hamilton	Great Britain	The ship was lost on the Bahama Banks. She was on a voyage from British Honduras to London.
Hector	Great Britain	The ship was in collision with HMS Seaford ( (Kingdom of Great Britain) Royal Navy) at Dominica. She was consequently condemned.
Jenny	Ireland	The ship foundered in the Atlantic Ocean. Her crew took to the boat and were rescued after sixteen days by a Spanish vessel. Jenny was on a voyage from Cork to New York.
Kazan	Russia	The ship was driven ashore and wrecked near Nordkapp, Norway. She was on a voyage from Arkhangelsk to Amsterdam, Dutch Republic.
King George	Great Britain	The ship foundered off Nevis.
Le Tonnerre	Kingdom of France	American Revolutionary War: The vessel was captured by HMS Senegal (Royal Navy) and destroyed between December, 1777 and March, 1778.
Liberty	Great Britain	The ship was lost whilst on a voyage from Livorno, Grand Duchy of Tuscany to Cádiz, Spain and the Barbary Coast.
Lock	Great Britain	The ship was lost in the Saint Lawrence River, British America.
Lord Amherst	Great Britain	The ship ran aground in the Saint Lawrence River. She was on a voyage from Quebec to Barcelona, Spain.
Lucy	Great Britain	The transport ship was lost in the Saint Lawrence River.
Mary & Francis	Ireland	The ship was lost in the Bay of Canso. She was on a voyage from Cork to Quebec, British America.
Minerva	Great Britain	The ship was lost on the coast of Florida.
Norbury	Ireland	The ship was driven ashore and wrecked at Sandy Hook, New Jersey, United States. She was on a voyage from Cork to New York.
USS Repulse	(United States) Continental Navy	American Revolutionary War: The gunboat, a xebec was destroyed.
Resolution	Great Britain	The ship was captured by an American privateer. She was ordered in to the Piscataqua River but foundered three days later. Her crew survived. Resolution was on a voyage from Newfoundland to the West Indies.
Salisbury	Great Britain	The ship foundered in the Gulf of Florida. She was on a voyage from Mobile, Alabama, British America to Cork.
Sally	Great Britain	The ship was lost on the Jardines, off the coast of Cuba. She was on a voyage from Jamaica to New York.
St Zacharias	Portugal	The ship was lost at Maranhão, Brazil.
Thames	Great Britain	The ship was declared missing in November. She was on a voyage from Jamaica to New York.
Triton	Great Britain	The victualling ship was driven ashore in Rhode Island, United States. She was later refloated.
Volunteer	United States	American Revolutionary War: The schooner was sunk in an engagement with HMS Brune ( (Kingdom of Great Britain) Royal Navy) with the loss of her captain. Survivors were resched by HMS Brune.
William and Elizabeth	Great Britain	The ship ran aground near Belize. She was on a voyage from London to the Mississippi River.
