= List of ship launches in 1771 =

The list of ship launches in 1771 includes a chronological list of some ships launched in 1771.

Date	Ship	Class	Builder	Location	Country	Notes
January	Saint Louis	Yacht		Rochefort	Kingdom of France	For French Navy.
14 February	Alexandre	Artésien-class ship of the line		Brest	Kingdom of France	For French Navy.
14 February	Roland	Artésien-class ship of the line		Brest	Kingdom of France	For French Navy.
2 March	Serin	Corvette		Rochefort	Kingdom of France	For French Navy.
15 March	San Pablo	Third rate	Reales Astilleros de Esteiro	Ferrol	Spain	For Spanish Navy.
12 April	Pervyi	Pervyi-class frigate	Ivan I. Afanaseyev	Saint Petersburg	Russia	For Imperial Russian Navy.
13 April	Vtoroi	Pervyi-class frigate	Ivan I. Afanaseyev	Novopavlovsk	Russia	For Imperial Russian Navy.
20 April	Puce	Cutter		Dunkirk	Kingdom of France	For French Navy.
April	Sauterelle	Cutter	Chevallier Antoine Groignard	Lorient	Kingdom of France	For French Navy.
30 May	Iupiter	Bomb vessel	V. A. Selyaninov	Kronstadt	Russia	For Imperial Russian Navy.
May	Lévrier	Cutter	Léon-Michel Guignace	Bordeaux	Kingdom of France	For French Navy.
14 June	San Joaquín	San Joaquín-class ship of the line		Carthagena	Spain	For Spanish Navy.
15 June	Falcon	Swallow-class ship-sloop	Thomas Bucknall	Portsmouth Dockyard	Great Britain	For Royal Navy.
21 June	Mars	Donder-class bomb vessel	V. A. Selyaninov	Kronstadt	Russia	For Imperial Russian Navy.
June	Furet	Cutter		Bordeaux	Kingdom of France	For French Navy.
June	Lezard	Cutter	Léon-Michel Guignace	Bordeaux	Kingdom of France	For French Navy.
June	Milan	Cutter	Léon-Michel Guignace	Bordeaux	Kingdom of France	For French Navy.
June	Moucheron	Cutter	Chevallier Antoine Groignard	Saint-Malo	Kingdom of France	For French Navy.
14 July	Sardine	Corvette	Broquier	Toulon	Kingdom of France	For French Navy.
13 August	Nossa Senhora da Conceição	Second rate	Manuel Vicente Nunes	Lisbon	Portugal	For Portuguese Navy.
26 September	Grafton	Albion-class ship of the line	Adam Hayes	Deptford Dockyard	Great Britain	For Royal Navy
9 October	Osterley	East Indiaman	Wells	Deptford	Great Britain	For British East India Company.
29 December	Looe	Fifth-rate warship	Thomas Snelgrove	Limehouse	Great Britain	For the Royal Navy.
Unknown date	Barbara	West Indiaman		Philadelphia, Pennsylvania	Thirteen Colonies	For private owner.
Unknown date	Earl of Sandwich	East Indiaman			Great Britain	For British East India Company.
Unknown date	Expedition	Cutter			Great Britain	For private owner.
Unknown date	Godfrey	East Indiaman	Edward Greaves	Limehouse	Great Britain	For British East India Company.
Unknown date	Harpooner	Merchantman		Liverpool	Great Britain	For private owner.
Unknown date	Hoogkarspel	East Indiaman		Enkhuizen	Dutch Republic	For Dutch East India Company.
Unknown date	Hercules	Merchantman		Georgia	Thirteen Colonies	For Private owner.
Unknown date	Sylphide	Schooner	Henri Chevillard	Rochefort	Kingdom of France	For French Navy.
Unknown date	Marquis of Rockingham	East Indiaman	Batson	Limehouse	Great Britain	For British East India Company.
Unknown date	Nuestra Señora de Atocha	Corvette	Reales Astilleros de Esteiro	Ferrol	Spain	For Spanish Navy.
Unknown date	Nuestra Señora de los Dolores	Corvette	Reales Astilleros de Esteiro	Ferrol	Spain	For Spanish Navy.
Unknown date	Nuestra Señora de los Pastoriza	Corvette	Reales Astilleros de Esteiro	Ferrol	Spain	For Spanish Navy.
Unknown date	Rose	Merchantman		New York	Thirteen Colonies	For private owner.
Unknown date	San Rafael	Third rate		Havana	(Spain) Cuba	For Spanish Navy.
Unknown date	Santa Ursula	Bomb vessel	Reales Astilleros de Esteiro	Ferrol	Spain	For Spanish Navy.
