= USS Hornet (1775) =

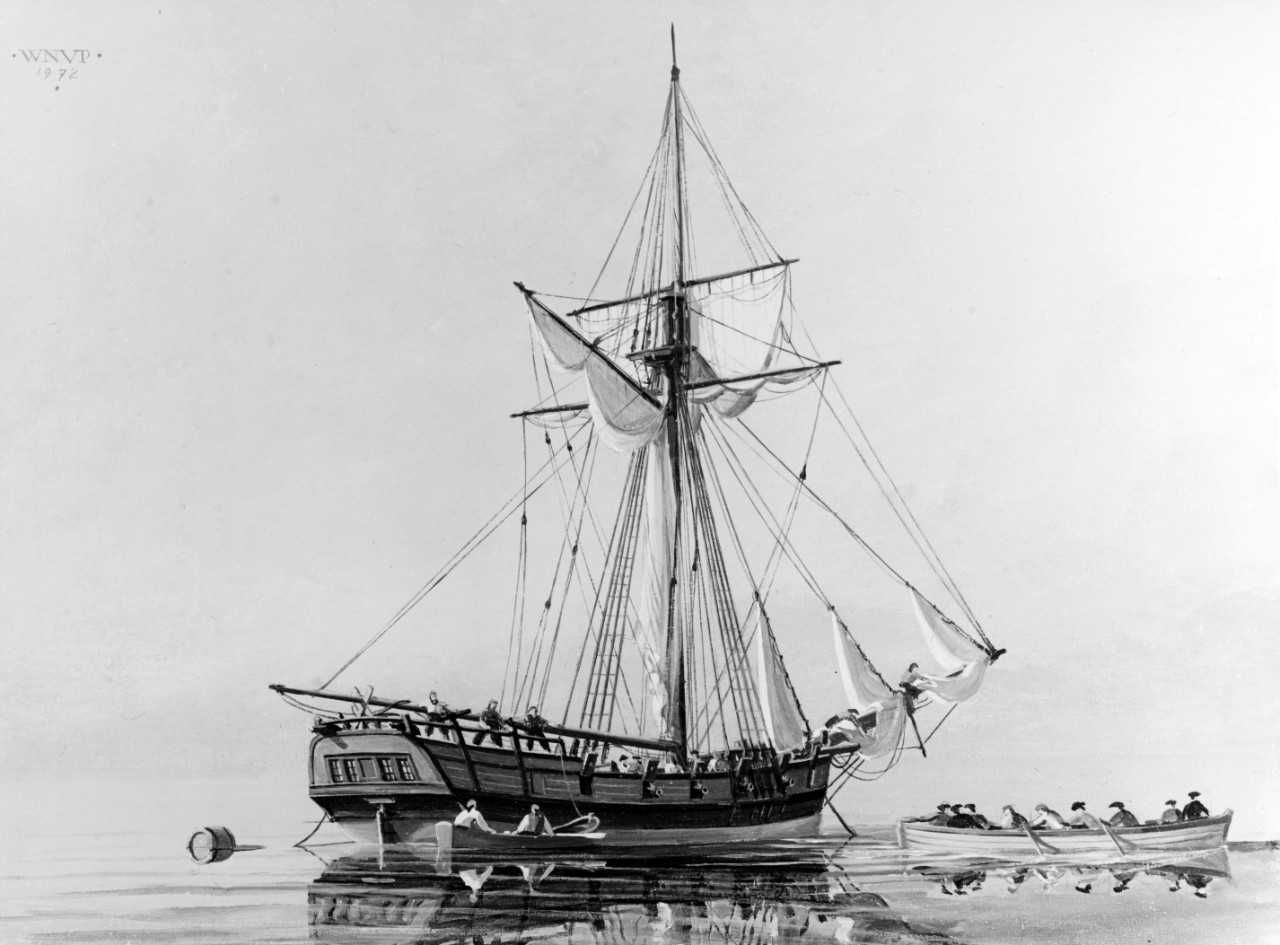
- 1972 painting of Hornet by William Nowland Van Powell

History

United States
- Name: USS Hornet
- Acquired: 1775
- Captured: 27 April 1777 by HM Sloop of War Porcupine

General characteristics
- Type: Sloop
- Armament: 10 × 4-pounder guns

Service record

USS Hornet was a 10-gun sloop-of-war of the Continental Navy. She was chartered from Captain William Stone in December 1775 to serve under Stone in Commodore Esek Hopkins. The voyage would be the first military action for master's mate Joshua Barney. The vessel was damaged while sailing with the fleet and returned to base. Hornet patrolled Delaware Bay until being captured on 27 April 1777 by the Royal Navy. Hornet was taken to Jamaica, where the ship was found to be leaking and was condemned.

== Background ==
There is some degree of discrepancy in dates concerning both the Hornet and the ship USS Wasp, both of which fitted out in Baltimore, Maryland. The biography of Joshua Barney claims that upon his return to Baltimore after a voyage aboard the ship Sydney (which he had taken command of after the death of her captain) he signed onto be first mate aboard the Hornet and was first tasked to recruit a crew. Part of the way he did this was by hoisting an "American Flag" provided from Philadelphia, Pennsylvania, by Hopkins, indicating the ships were already accepted into the fleet. The Naval Documents of the American Revolution, volume 2, p. 583 place the date of this return as 23 October 1775. Barney claims that after fitting out, both the Hornet and the Wasp sailed in company to join the fleet at Philadelphia at the end of November.

However, colonial records show that on 2 December 1775, Colonel Benjamin Harrison was dispatched to Baltimore to acquire 2–3 ships to be armed and augment Esek Hopkins's fleet. These ships are identified as being the Hornet and the Wasp. Both vessels are noted by the Baltimore Committee as being fitting out as of 18 December 1775. Both the Hornet and the Wasp are noted as joining the fleet in Philadelphia on 13 February 1776. Given the dates from the Colonial sources come from the records of government bodies in the course of their work and that the dates from Mary Barney's account come from family papers and recollections, it is more likely that Barney's dates are in error and that the events in question happened according to the later timeline. Hence, it is probably safer to say that the Hornet along with the Wasp was acquired by the Continental Congress via the efforts of Col. Harrison between 2 and 18 December, fitted out between the date of acquisition along with the Wasp, and then were commissioned into the Continental Navy on 13 February 1776 after joining the fleet in Philadelphia.

== Service ==
Hornet then sailed with Hopkins fleet 18 February 1776. Outside the Virginia Capes, she ran afoul of USS Fly and was unable to accompany the fleet for the amphibious assault on New Providence. On 27 August 1776, Congress offer to purchase the Hornet from her owner, William Stone. She patrolled in the Delaware Bay for nearly a year, then ran the British blockade to convoy merchantmen to Charleston.

Hornet was captured by HM schooner Porcupine on 27 April 1777. According to records of the Vice Admiralty Court at Jamaica, Hornet was built in Bermuda, of 100 tons burden, mounted ten naval long guns and four swivel gun, and had a crew of thirty-five. She sailed from Philadelphia in January or February 1777 for Charleston in ballast, and at the latter place loaded twenty barrels of rice and twenty-six barrels of indigo for Martinique. The action with Porcupine, which lasted three-quarters of an hour, took place in latitude 22.5 degrees north, and longitude 70 degrees west (roughly 75 nautical miles, 139 km, 86 mi north northeast of Cockburn Town), with upwards of fifty shot being fired. Upon arrival in Jamaica the Hornet was leaky, and, after condemnation, was appraised at £2443.12, including cargo, stores and gunpowder.
