= Blytheville Greyhound Bus Station =

- U.S. National Register of Historic Places
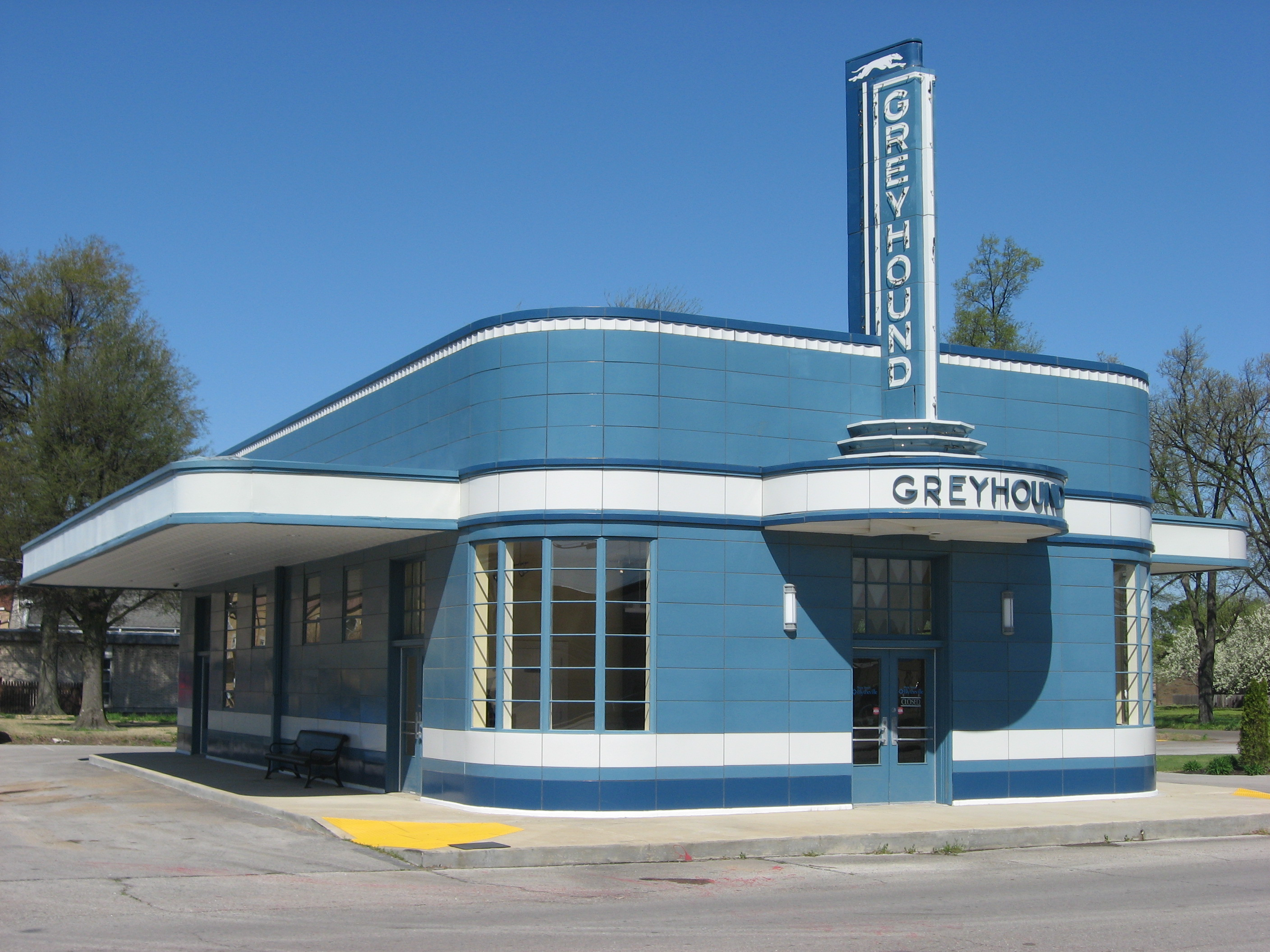

- Location within Arkansas Location within the United States
- Location: 109 N. Fifth St., Blytheville, Arkansas
- Coordinates: 35°55′41″N 89°54′29″W
- Area: less than one acre
- Built: 1937
- Architect: Noland Van Powell, Ben Watson White
- Architectural style: Moderne, Art Moderne
- NRHP reference No.: 87000447
- Added to NRHP: August 17, 1987

The Blytheville Greyhound Bus Station is located at 109 North 5th Street in Blytheville, Arkansas. It is a single-story island-type station in the Streamline Moderne architectural style, with rounded corners, and projecting canopies on either side. The main entrance also has a rounded canopy over it, and a vertical sign rising above, advertising the Greyhound Bus Lines. This station was built by the company in around 1937, when it was undergoing a major expansion campaign. The building is one of the finest examples of Art Moderne styling in the state. The station was designed by architects William Nowland Van Powell and Ben Watson White.

The station was listed on the National Register of Historic Places in 1987. The station ceased bus operations in 2001 and fell into disrepair. In 2004 the station was purchased for preservation and restoration. Since 2010, it has served as an office, museum, and visitor center for Main Street Blytheville.

== See also ==
- Blytheville Commercial Historic District
- National Register of Historic Places listings in Mississippi County, Arkansas
