= Old Greyhound Bus Station (Jackson, Mississippi) =

- Jackson Greyhound Bus Station
- U.S. Historic district – Contributing property
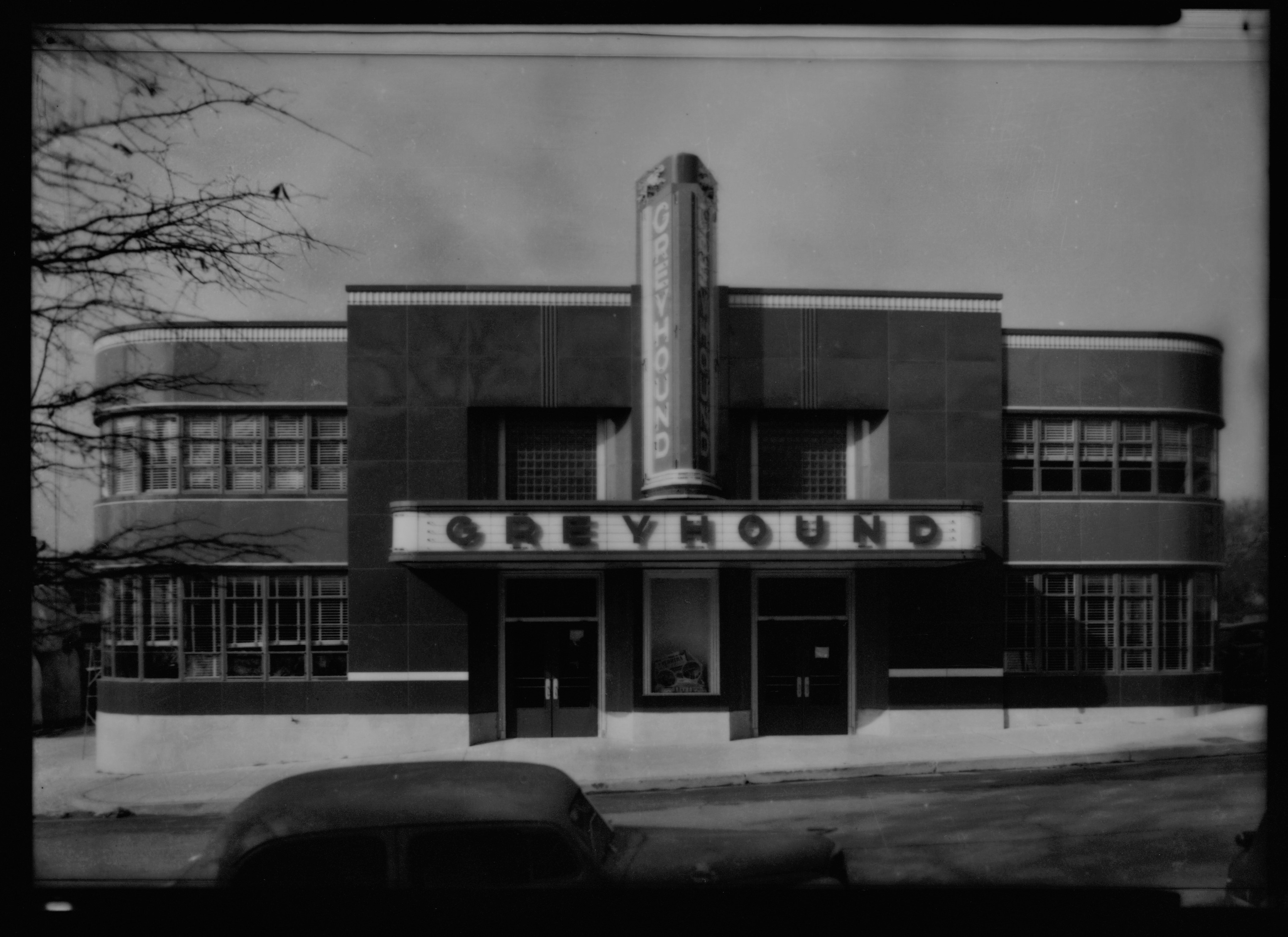
- Greyhound Bus Station, Jackson Mississippi, December 1939 (MDAH photo)

- Location within Mississippi Location within the United States
- Location: 219 N. Lamar St., Jackson, Mississippi
- Coordinates: 32°18′06.6″N 90°11′08.2″W
- Built: 1938
- Architect: W.S. Arrasmith or Mahan & Van Powell
- Architectural style: Streamline moderne
- Restored: 1989
- Restored by: Robert Parker Adams
- Part of: Farish Street Neighborhood Historic District (ID80002245)
- Designated CP: March 13, 1980

The Greyhound Bus Station at 219 N. Lamar St., Jackson, Mississippi, was the site of many arrests during the May 1961 Freedom Rides of the Civil Rights Movement. The Art Deco building has been preserved and currently functions as an architect's office.

== Construction ==
In 1937, Greyhound Lines contracted for a new bus station in Jackson, Mississippi. Incorporating a streamlined style and vertical, illuminated "Greyhound" marquee, it is unique for its structural glass exterior. When operating as a bus station, the building included a coffeeshop and bathing facilities. Sources differ on whether the station is the work of W.S. Arrasmith or George Mahan Jr. and Nowland Van Powell of Memphis, Tennessee.

== Freedom Ride to Jackson, Mississippi ==
Freedom Riders were civil rights activists who rode interstate buses into the segregated southern United States, in 1961 and subsequent years, to challenge the non-enforcement of the United States Supreme Court decisions which had ruled segregated public buses to be unconstitutional.

Jackson, Mississippi was planned as a stop on the Freedom Rides of May 1961. On May 28 that year, nine Freedom Riders arrived at the Greyhound Bus Station. Other groups had arrived four days earlier. Upon arrival, riders would seek access to facilities denied to non-whites, such as waiting areas designated "Whites Only." During the next four months, 329 people were arrested in the town, half of them black and half of them white, with a quarter being women. Part of the Freedom Riders' strategy was to overwhelm Jackson city jails by refusing bail. When Jackson's jails were full of riders arrested at Trailways and Greyhound facilities, Freedom Riders were transferred to Parchman penitentiary.

== Preservation ==
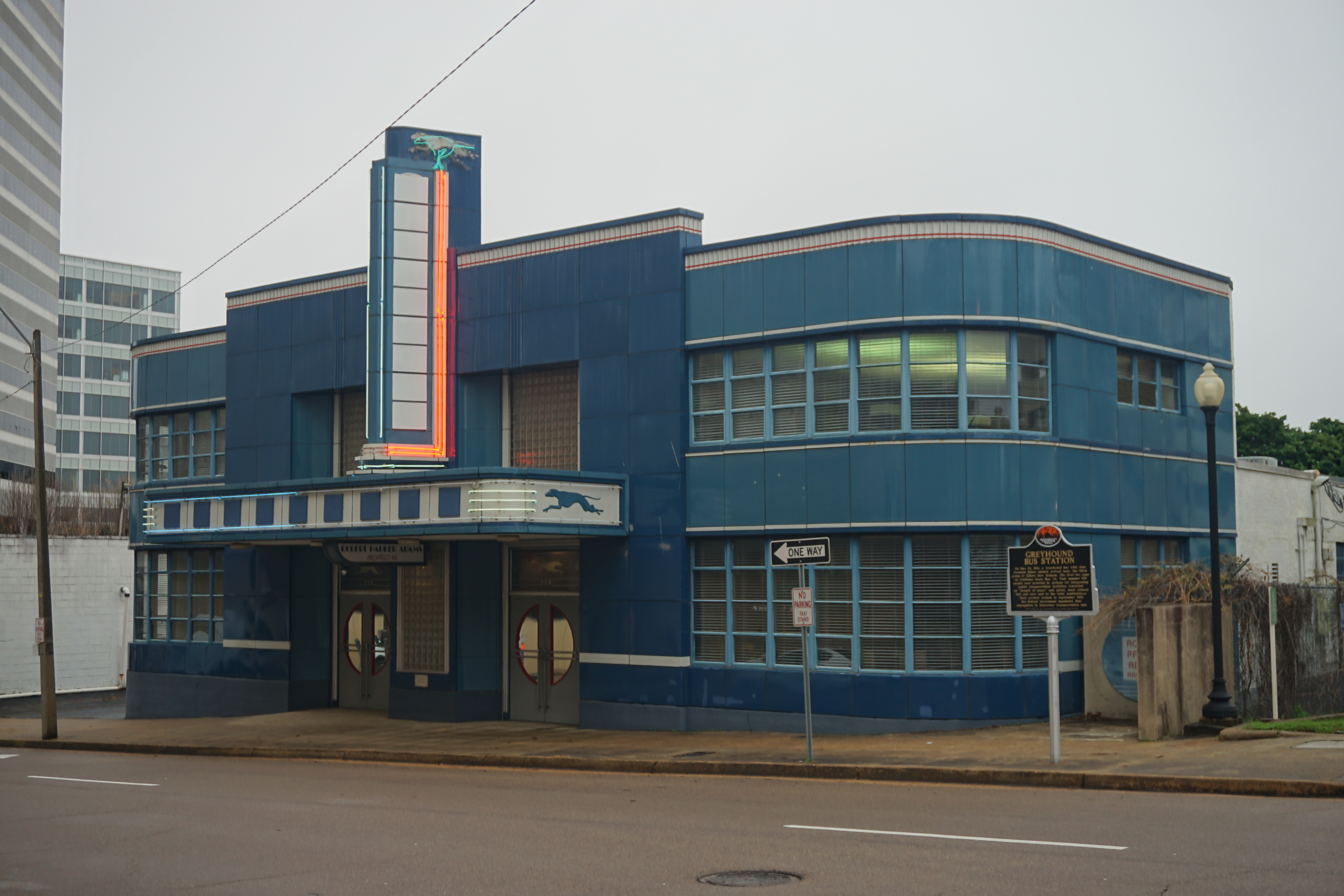
Old Greyhound Bus Station in 2018

Located within the southeast boundary of the Farish Street Neighborhood Historic District, the building was acquired by architect Robert Parker Adams in 1988; his firm restored the station's exterior and interior. The state of Mississippi has placed an explanatory marker at the site.

== See also ==
- Farish Street Neighborhood Historic District, Jackson, Mississippi
