= USS Mosquito (1775) =

Schooner of the Continental Navy

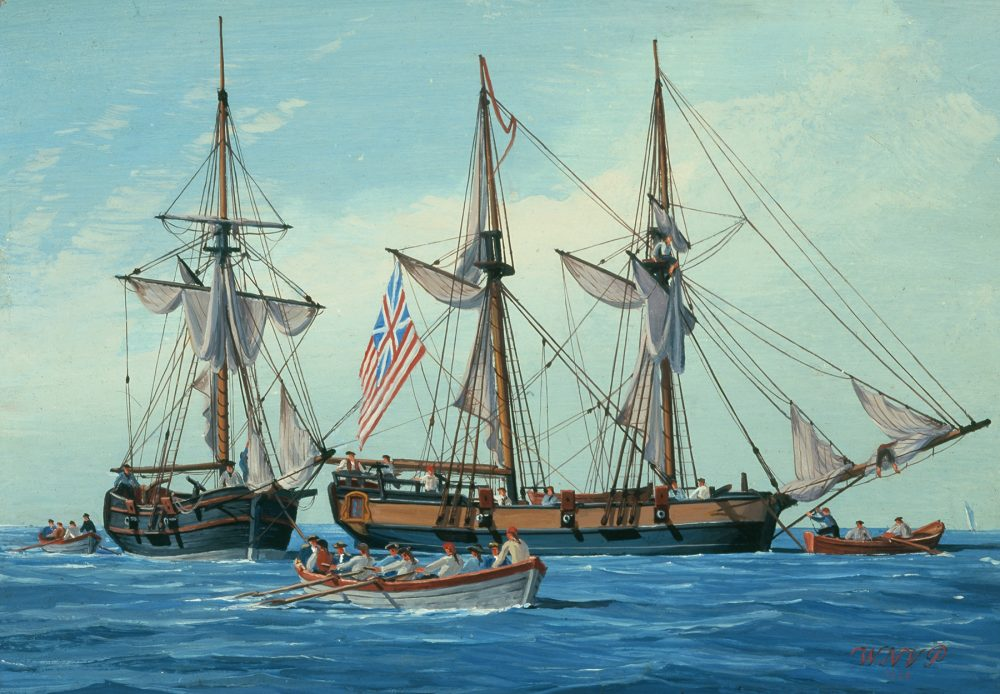
- 1974 painting of Mosquito (right) and USS Fly by William Nowland Van Powell. Even though portrayed as a sloop, Mosquito was most likely a schooner like Fly.

History

United States
- Name: Mosquito
- Namesake: Mosquito
- Acquired: 1775
- Out of service: October 1777
- Fate: Destroyed by October 1777, most likely 7 July 1777
- Notes: often identified also as a sloop in later sources

General characteristics
- Type: Schooner
- Propulsion: Sail
- Armament: 4 × guns, later upgraded to 6 guns w/ 4 swivel guns

USS Mosquito was a schooner of the Continental Navy. Believed to have been purchased at Philadelphia in late 1775, she patrolled the Delaware River until destroyed during the British capture of Philadelphia in October 1777. The Dictionary of American Naval Fighting Ships (DANFS) has identified this ship as a sloop, yet records from the period which are believed to refer to the ship have consistently identified her as being a schooner. These records also provide a bit more detail of her fate, indicating she was burned after capture in July 1777 during Royal Navy operations along the Delaware River.

== Confusion concerning the ship's actual type ==
It is possible that there was a second ship with the same or similar name operating in American waters at the same time that has led to confusion. However, the government records described in detail below indicate that the ship with this name (often referred to with different spellings to include Musquito, or Musqueto, or Muskeito yet always with Lieutenant Albertson in command) was the only one with this name in Continental service at that time. Only later records, starting at least with the 1850 The Navy of the United States, From the Commencement, 1775 to 1853 is the ship in Continental service specifically referred to as a "sloop" and her destruction along with other elements of the fleet in October 1777 stated (and then with the word "supposed".) The statements and descriptions concerning the ship in this text are carried over almost exactly into the DANFS entry and in Silverstone's work. Emmons's 1850 book does make mention of a ship under the name "Musketo" later and names her a schooner under the command of Albertson. Given Albertson's listing on the Marine Committee's formal list of ranks and precedence, it is clear this is the vessel in Continental service with that name.

== Summary of known available materials ==
On 1 October 1776, the Continental Marine Committee ordered Lieutenant Thomas Albertson to sail the schooner Muskeito to North Carolina with letters, and to bring back such naval stores as he could gather. Then on 10 October the Marine Committee formally established the ranks and precedence of the commanders of vessels in the Continental Navy. Lieutenant Thomas Albertson, as commander of the smallest vessel, Musquito, of four guns, ranked 26th out of 26.

The next (implicit) mention of Mosquito occurs on 20 December 1776 when Robert Morris lists the schooner Musquito among the ships that are in public service in a letter to Silas Deane. It is interesting to note that in this same listing, the Fly is listed as a sloop while in most other records she is referred to as a schooner, indicating that Mosquito is not the only ship for which her type may be in question.

Mosquito is again mentioned by name by being station in Delaware Bay with Fly watching six British ships that have effectively bottled up the fleet in a letter dated 30 December 1776.

Next on 22 April 1777 the Navy Board of the Middle Department asked to borrow 70 shot for 2-pounder guns. Thomas Albertson carried the request, which he needed for his vessel, which was almost ready for sea.

On 6 July 1777 Captain John Linzee, of HMS Pearl, sent the schooner Endeavour, a longboat, and a sloop and yawl, prizes to Camilla, up Duck Creek, which empties into Delaware Bay, some five to six miles SEE from Bombay Hook. The expedition was under the command of Pearl's sailing master.

The expedition returned the next day. The British captured Mosquito, Captain Thomas Albertson, at 3 in the morning, without any opposition as the only people aboard were her master and gunner. She was armed with six 3-pounder guns and four swivel guns; the expedition burned her after taking their two prisoners off. Later that day Linzee had the prize sloop burnt.

As with many ships and actions of the period of the American Revolution, there is some question as to the true nature of this vessel and its history. At the time of the Emmons's work and the DANFS entry, the volumes of the Naval Documents of the American Revolution that mention her later history were not yet compiled. Even after their compilation, until the work of organizations like archive.org, their availability was rather limited. The identification of a ship or ships with the same name in service at the same time in the same area yet of different types has added to the confusion. With DANFS being the best available authority at the time, William Nowland Van Powell's 1974 painting of the ship with USS Fly shows her as a sloop rather than a schooner as this is how DANFS has identified her. As more records come to light and are more thoroughly examined, the true nature of the situation will become more clear and defined.
