= Grand Palace Hotel, New Orleans =

Coordinates: 29.9591°N 90.0785°W

The Grand Palace Hotel was a 17-story building located in the Mid City area of New Orleans, Louisiana. The building became known worldwide for its implosion on 22 July 2012.

== Construction ==
Designed by William Nowland Van Powell and Henry Ehrensing as the Claiborne Towers apartment building, construction started in April 1950 at a cost of $10 million. The building was the largest apartment complex in the city upon opening in 1951, containing 1,036 air-conditioned apartments, and was built on land leased from Tulane University by the developer Paul Kapelow.

The lobby was particularly well finished, including terrazzo flooring, wooden panels of black walnut, and a bank of Otis elevators.

== History ==
By 1952, the building featured a wide range of facilities and occupants, including a team of cleaners, a ground floor lounge, a beauty shop, a lingerie boutique, offices of Southern Bell Telephone and Telegraph Company, and a Walgreens store.

Perhaps the most famous story from this period of the building's history is when the Jewish-American mobster, Phillip "Dandy Phil" Kastel, was found dead in his apartment by a private nurse on 16 August 1962. He had reportedly taken his own life with a .38 caliber revolver.

Construction of the Interstate 10 overpass adjacent to the building in the 1960s proved detrimental to Claiborne Towers' fortunes as an apartment block and it was partially converted in the early 1960s into the Sheraton Delta Motor Hotel, then in 1972 converted to a senior citizens' residence called Delta Towers.

During the 1980s, the elderly residents were evicted in preparation for the building's full conversion into a hotel. The new hotel, the Ramada on Canal, first opened, although at the time incomplete, for the 1984 Sugar Bowl. The hotel was subsequently known as the Crescent on Canal and the Pallas Hotel, before taking on its final name, the Grand Palace Hotel.

== Closure and demolition ==
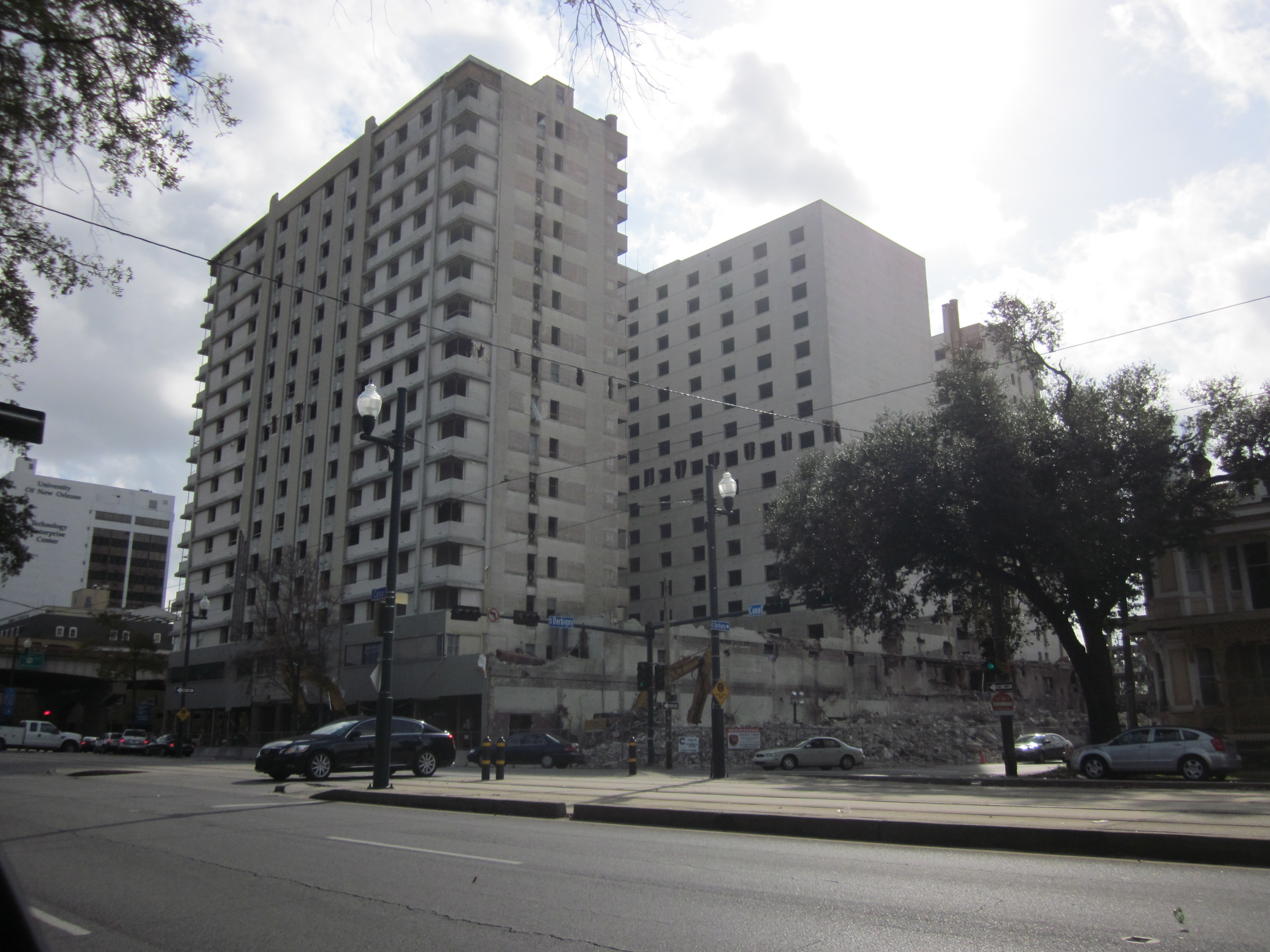
Claiborne Towers during its December 2011 demolition

The building, like many others, was damaged by Hurricane Katrina in August 2005 and never reopened. During preparation works for demolition, a fire broke out at the building on 5 July 2012, at the time causing speculation that plans for its demolition might have to be changed. The main demolition of the building (after months of preparatory work) was by implosion on 22 July 2012, a story which was covered by many worldwide news organizations due to its speed of just 10 seconds. The implosion, previously scheduled for 20 November 2011, then 18 December 2011, was undertaken to make way for the new University Medical Center, a replacement for Charity Hospital, which was also damaged by Hurricane Katrina.
