= Greyhound Half-Way House =

- Greyhound Half-Way House (Waverly, Tennessee)
- U.S. National Register of Historic Places
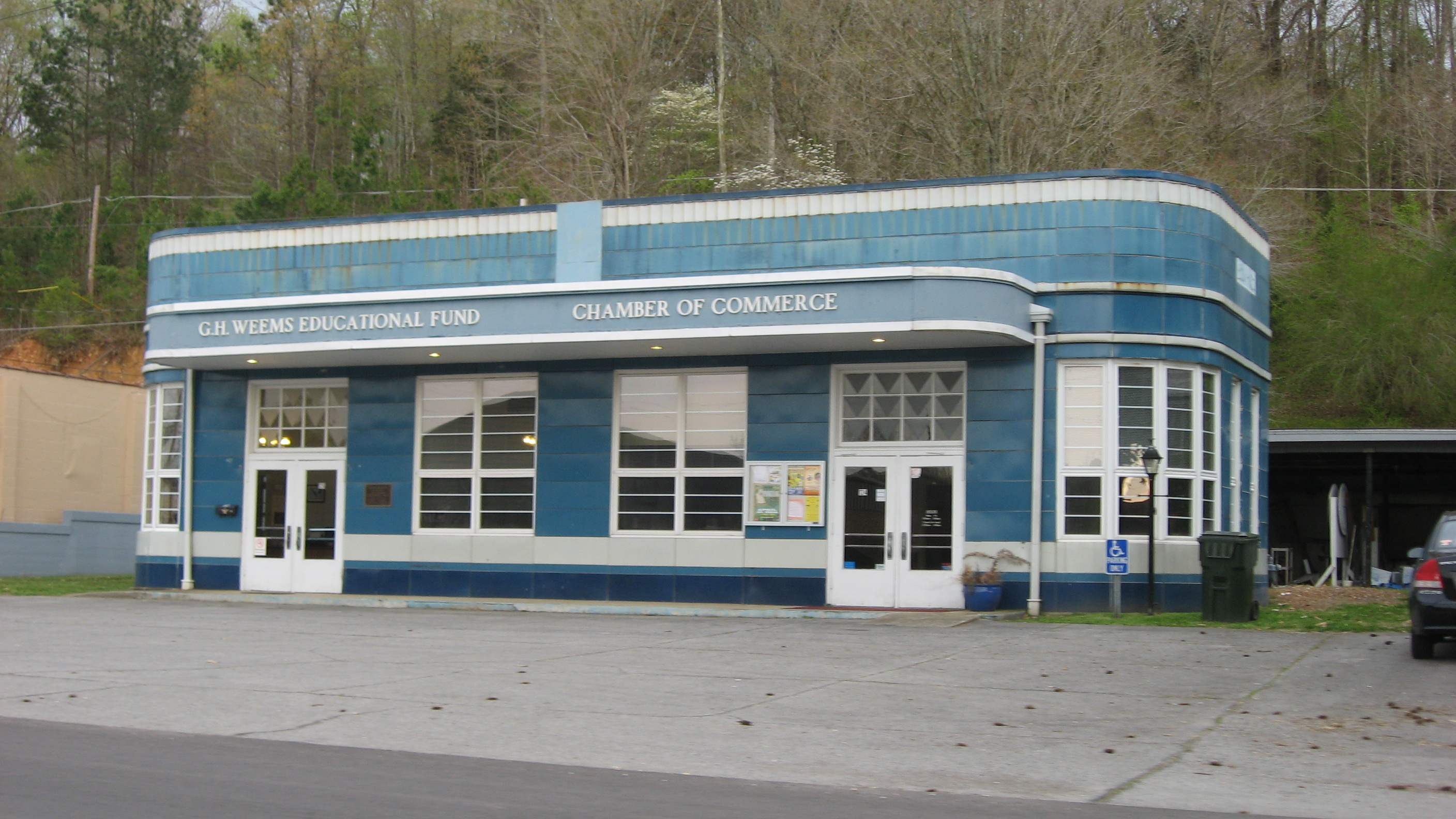
- Greyhound Half-Way House, preserved, April 2014

- Location within Tennessee Location within the United States
- Location: 124 East Main Street, Waverly, Tennessee
- Coordinates: 36.082879°N 87.792843°W
- Built: 1938 or 1939
- Architect: W. N. Van Powell
- Architectural style: Streamline Moderne
- NRHP reference No.: 99001588

The Greyhound Half-Way House at 124 E. Main Street in Waverly, Tennessee, United States, is a building formerly operated by Greyhound Lines as a Greyhound Half-Way Station.

The "half-way" name reflected its role as a rest stop at the midpoint of a longer trip. In the Waverly's station's case, it is located at the approximate midpoint of U.S. Highway 70 between Nashville and Jackson in Tennessee.

The Waverly Half-Way site began operation in 1925. The preserved structure was built in 1938 or 1939. Designed by William Nowland Van Powell the building is an example of Streamline Moderne architecture, and is faced with blue glazed tile.

It ceased to operate as a Greyhound station in 1973 and was partially boarded up and repainted at that time. A nearly-identical building, a half-way station constructed in Flat River, Missouri, still stands but retains very little of its historic appearance, and now functions as a laundromat.

The Waverly Half-Way station was added to the National Register of Historic Places in 1999, and was purchased by the Humphreys County Arts Council in 2024. The Humphreys County Arts Council is currently in the process of raising funds to restore the building to be used as art classes and gallery space, as well as a small event venue.

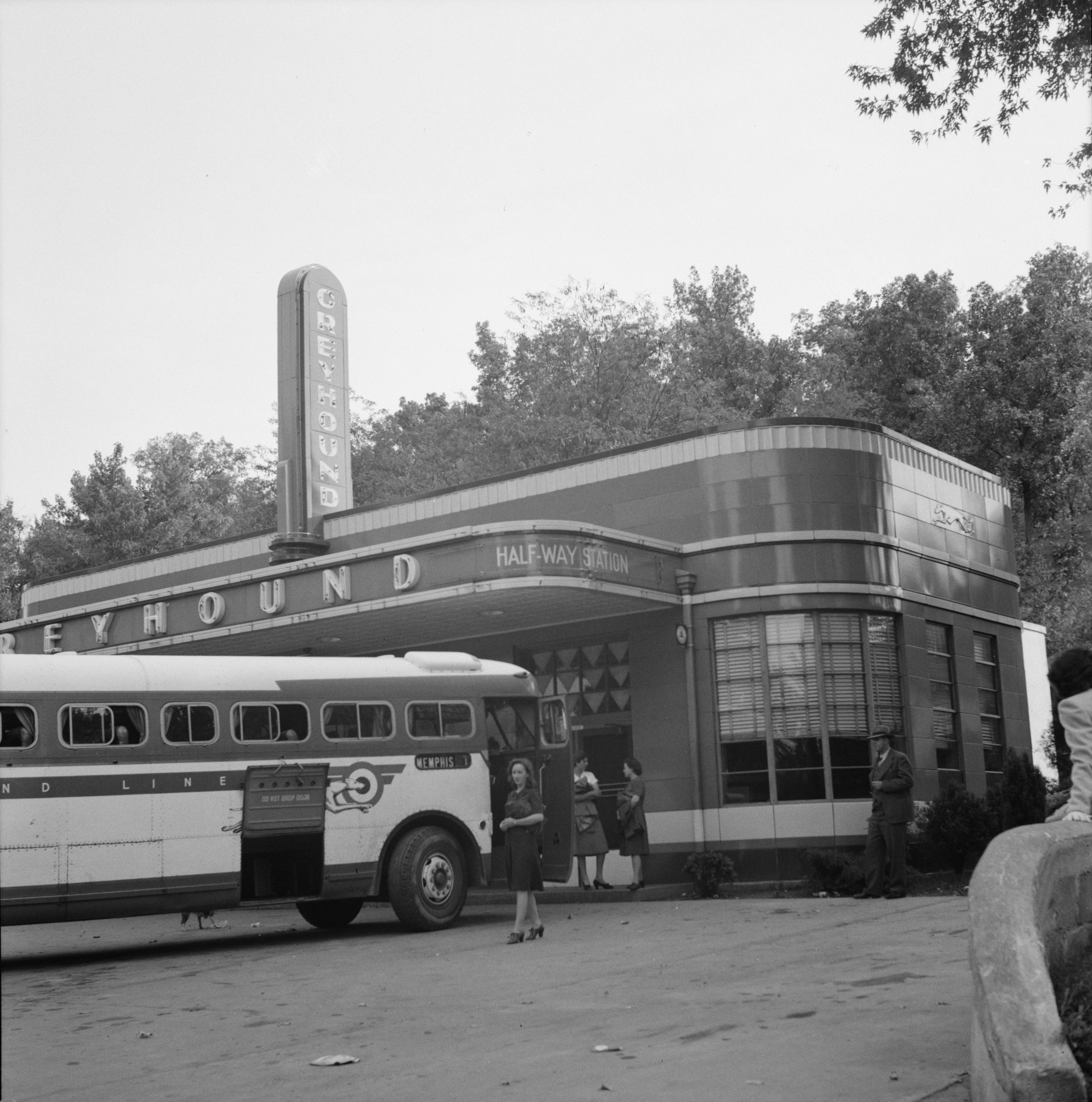
A Greyhound bus stops at the Half-Way station in Waverly, Tennessee, on a trip in September 1943 (photo by U.S. Farm Security Administration)
