= USS Fly =

Sloop of the Continental Navy

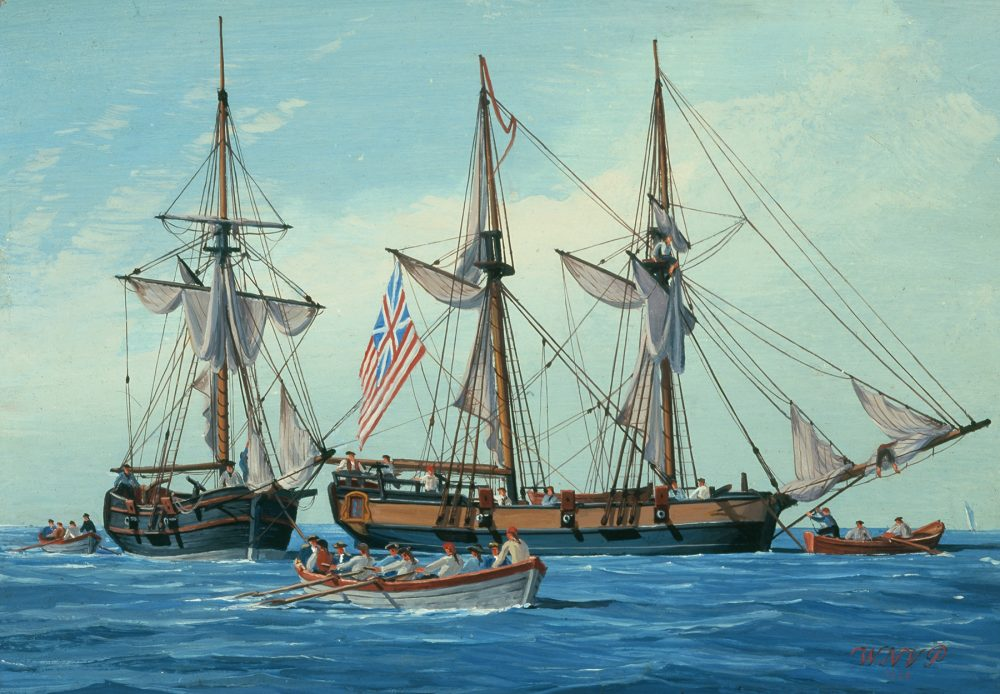
- Painting of Fly (left) alongside USS Mosquito by William Nowland Van Powell

History

United States
- Name: Fly
- Namesake: Fly
- Commissioned: January 1776
- Decommissioned: November 1777
- Fate: Burned to prevent capture

General characteristics
- Armament: 6 × 9-pound guns

USS Fly was an 8-gun sloop of the Continental Navy. She was part of a squadron that raided the port of Nassau and engaged the 20-gun HMS Glasgow.

Fly, one of the eight former merchant ships fitted out by the Naval Committee between November 1775 and January 1776. She was purchased in Providence, Rhode Island under a Congressional authorization dated 16 January 1775 for a small tender or despatch vessel for the fleet. A schooner, often referred to as a sloop, she was first commanded by Lieutenant Hoystead Hacker. This ship appears to be the same one that General George Washington authorized on 18 September 1775 to sail for supplies. A list of those supplies brought to the colonies by Fly was reported in the Naval Documents of the American Revolution, Volume 2, pg 254.

Early in 1776, Fly joined the squadron of Commodore Esek Hopkins off Reedy Island at the head of Delaware Bay, and on 17 February sailed with this force for its historic cruise to New Providence, America's first amphibious operation. Two nights out, Fly fouled the sloop USS Hornet, who was forced to return to port. Fly, however, was able to rejoin the squadron off New Providence 11 March, finding that the operation had been a great success, and that a large quantity of military stores sorely needed by the Continental Army had been taken. Heavily laden with the valuable supplies, the fleet departed New Providence 17 March, and on 4 April arrived off Long Island where it took two small British ships of war and two merchantmen. Two days later the squadron engaged the British sloop-of-war HMS Glasgow, which successfully resisted American attempts to capture her before sailing into Newport Rhode Island, though her tender was captured. On 8 April the fleet arrived at New London, Connecticut, to land the captured military stores.

Fly patrolled off New London to learn the strength of the British Fleet until June, when she was detached to carry cannon from Newport to Amboy, New Jersey, where she was blockaded briefly by the British. Later in 1776, she cruised the New Jersey coast to intercept enemy ships bound for New York City. In an encounter with one of these in November, a number of Fly's men were wounded, and she was damaged to the extent that she had to put in at Philadelphia to repair and refit.

Ready for active service early in 1777, Fly convoyed merchantmen to sea, carried dispatches, and protected American ships in Cape May Channel. During the later part of the year, she was one of the Continental ships working with the Pennsylvania Navy to defend the Delaware River. In November when the British Fleet and powerful shore batteries forced the evacuation of Fort Mifflin and Fort Mercer, giving the British control of the river, Fly and the other Continental ships were burned to prevent their falling into the hands of the enemy.
