= Hercules (1771 ship) =

History

Province of Georgia
- Builder: Georgia
- Launched: 1771
- Fate: Transfer to British registry c.1777

Great Britain
- Name: Hercules
- Namesake: Hercules
- Acquired: c.1777
- Captured: 1797

General characteristics
- Tons burthen: 190, or 230 (bm)
- Armament: 6 × 4-pounder + 4 × 2-pounder guns
- Notes: Built of live oak and pine

Hercules was launched at Georgia in 1771. She appeared in Lloyd's Register in 1778 and became a West Indiaman. Between 1792 and 1796 she made three voyages as a whaler in the Southern Whale Fishery. In 1797 the French captured Hercules as she was on her fourth voyage.

== Career ==
Hercules appeared in Lloyd's Register in 1778 with H.Russell, master, Capt. & Co., owner, and trade London–Antigua. She underwent a good repair in 1785.

In 1790 Hercules's trade was London–New York. In 1792 her master changed from Russell to Coleman, and her owner from Capt. & Co. to Wilton.

1st whaling voyage (1792–1793): Hercules had arrived from Antigua on 12 July 1792. She underwent a good repair in 1792. Captain Coleman sailed from London in 1792. It is not clear when Hercules returned. In March 1793 Lloyd's List reported that Hercules had been at the Falkland Islands.

2nd whaling voyage (1793–1794): Captain Coleman sailed from London in 1793, bound for Peru. In May Hercules was at Rio de Janeiro needing food and water. She returned to London on 22 July 1794 with 48 tuns of sperm oil, seven tuns of whale oil, and 7500 seal skins.

3rd whaling voyage (1794–1796): Captain Henry Delano sailed from London in 1794, bound for the Brazil Banks. Hercules was at Rio in May 1796 with scurvy among her crew. She returned to London on 12 July 1796 with three tuns of sperm oil, 112 tuns of whale oil, and 70 cwt of whalebone.

== Fate ==
Lloyd's Register for 1797 showed Hercules's master changing from H. Delano to G. Hales.

Captain George Hales sailed from England in 1796. On 3 March 1797 Lloyd's List reported that the French had captured Hercules, Hale, master, and taken her into Bordeaux.
