= Marquis of Rockingham (1771 EIC ship) =

History

Great Britain
- Name: Marquis of Rockingham
- Owner: Robert Stewart
- Operator: East India Company
- Builder: Batson, Limehouse
- Launched: 1771
- Fate: Sank May 1777

General characteristics
- Class & type: East Indiaman
- Tons burthen: 499, or 758, or 824, or 824 86/94 (bm)
- Length: 145 ft 11 in (44.48 m) (overall); 118 ft 3 1/4 in (36.049 m) (keel)
- Beam: 36 ft 2 1/2 in (11.036 m)
- Depth of hold: 15 ft (4.6 m)
- Sail plan: Full-rigged ship

Marquis of Rockingham was a ship launched for the British East India Company in 1771. She made one complete voyage to Bombay. During her second voyage to Bombay she was wrecked in 1777.

== Career ==
Captain Alexander Hamilton left the Downs on 9 April 1772, bound for Bombay. Marquis of Rockingham reached Johanna on 23 July, and Bombay on 17 August. On 4 November she was at Tellicherry and Kedgeree on 28 December. On her homeward-bound voyage she passed Ingeli, a point on the Hooghli River on 8 March 1773. She reached Mauritius on 15 May and St Helena on 14 July. She arrived at the Downs on 18 September.

Between this voyage and the next Marquis of Rockingham may have undergone modifications. That would account for both the duration of the time between voyages and the change in her size between the two voyages. Alternatively, the 499 tons is somewhat suspect. Following Queen Anne's charter of 1702, between 1708 and 1747 almost every EIC vessel was registered as being of under 500 tons (bm). The reason was that the charter required every vessel of 500 tons or over to carry a chaplain. Apparently the Directors of the EIC did not feel this was a worthwhile expense. However, the practice of under registering may have persisted after the original motivation had elapsed.

For her second voyage, Hamilton left the Downs on 9 April 1776, again bound for Bombay. She reached Madeira on 24 April, Johanna on 29 August, and Bombay on 1 October. She then sailed to Surat, which she reached on 29 November, before she returned to Bombay on 25 December. On 18 January 1777 she was at Anjengo, before she returned to Bombay on 17 April.

== Loss ==
On 26 May Marquis of Rockingham wrecked on a rock about five miles offshore near the Seven Pagodas of Mahabalipuram on the Coromandel Coast, about 30 miles south of Madras. The crew and the EIC's "treasure" were saved.
