= William Nowland Van Powell =

American architect

William Nowland Van Powell (1904–1977), sometimes known professionally as William Van Powell or Nowland Van Powell was an American architect, painter, and historian from Memphis, Tennessee.

== Architect ==
In the 1930s, the Greyhound Lines bus company built many bus stations in the then-popular Streamline Moderne style. William Nowland Van Powell designed at least four of them. Working with George Mahan, Jr. in 1939, he was the architect of the Greyhound Bus Station in Jackson, Mississippi. Working with Ben Watson White, he designed the Blytheville Greyhound Bus Station in 1937.

He is also credited as the designer of two nearly-identical Greyhound Half-Way Stations: the Greyhound Half-Way House in Waverly, Tennessee, that has been preserved, and another in Flat River, Missouri that has been substantially remodeled into a laundromat.

Van Powell worked in other architectural styles for other clients. In 1927, he was the architect of the Venetian-inspired Memphis Steam Laundry building, formerly at 941 Jefferson Ave., Memphis, demolished in 2009.

Along with Henry Ehrensing, he was the architect of the Grand Palace Hotel, New Orleans (built originally as Claiborne Towers), and promoted by its developer as "likely to be one of the greatest buildings the South has ever seen." At the time, Claiborne Towers was the South's largest apartment project, with a planned 1036 units that included air conditioning.

He was also the architect of Memphis' Farnsworth Building (now the Memphis Business Journal Building), which was added to the National Register of Historic Places in 1983.

=== Buildings designed ===
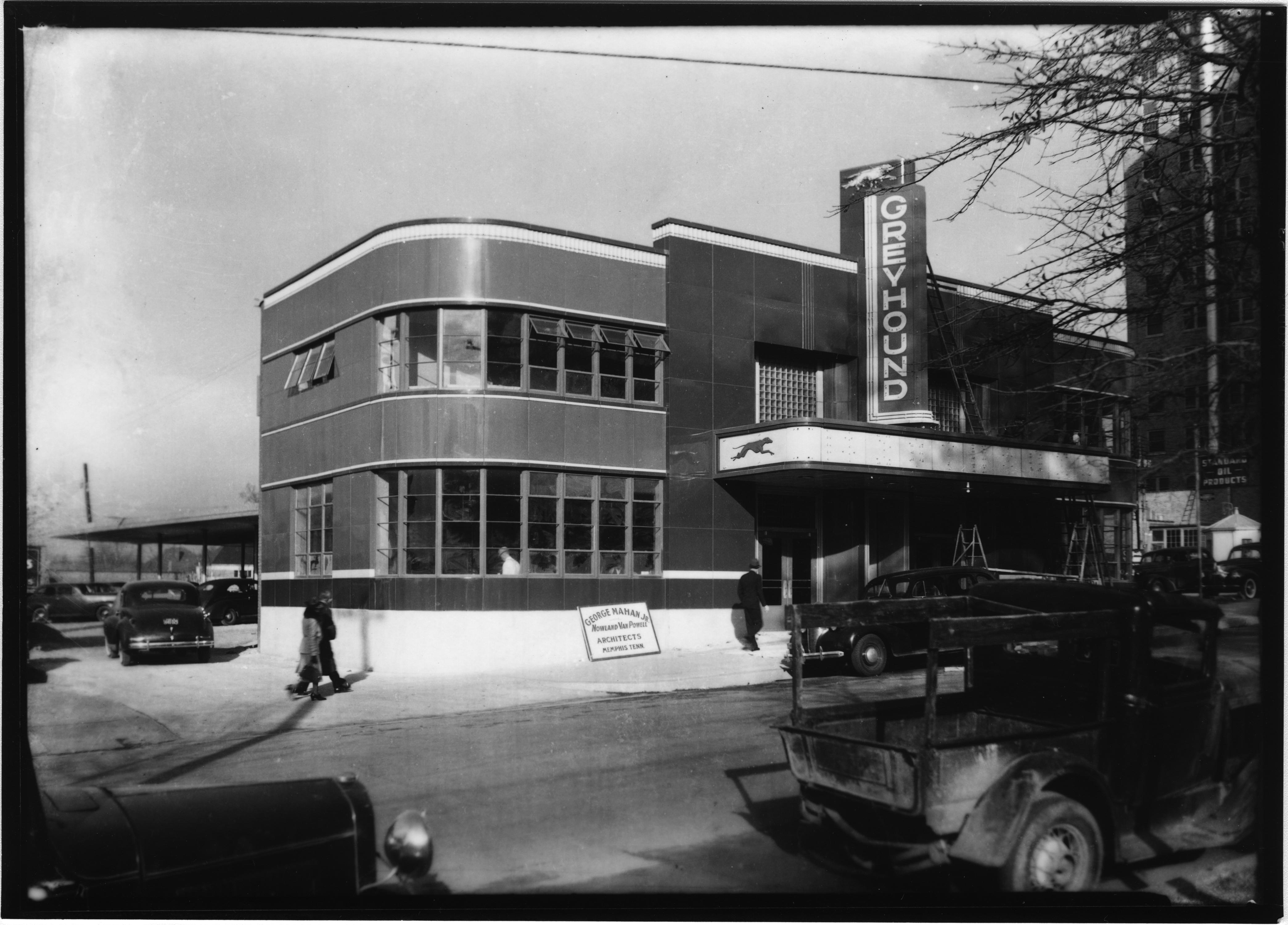
Old Greyhound Bus Station (Jackson, Mississippi) December 1939, showing George Mahan, Jr. and Nowland Van Powell, Architects (MDAH Photo)

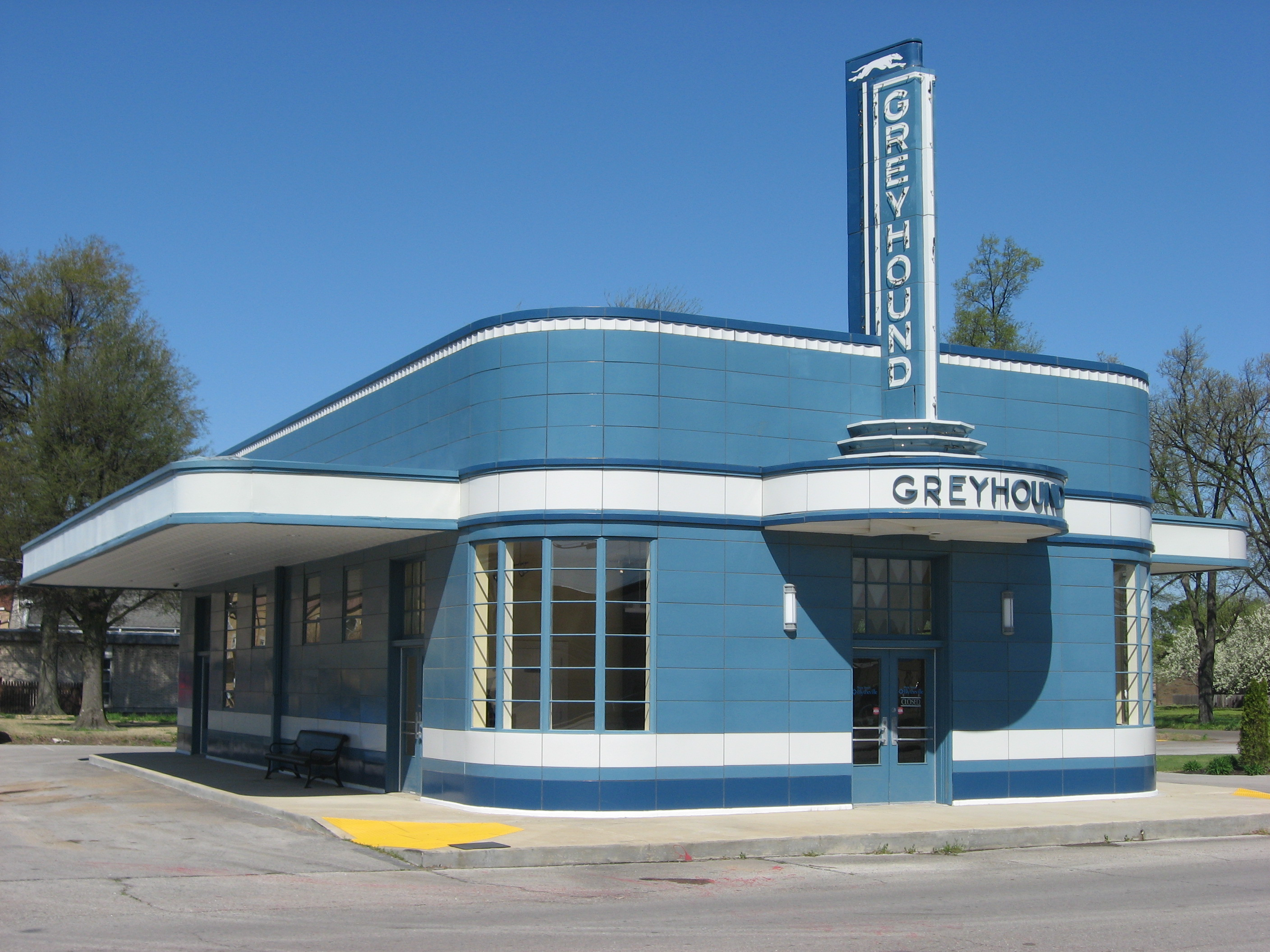
Blytheville Greyhound Bus Station

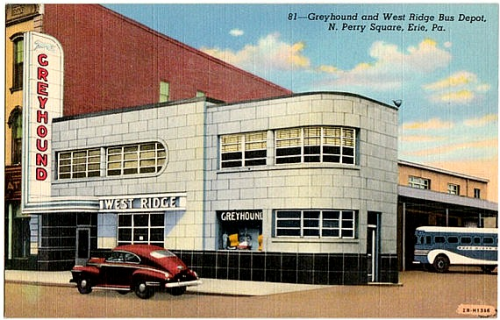
Greyhound and West Ridge bus station, Erie PA (postcard c. 1940)

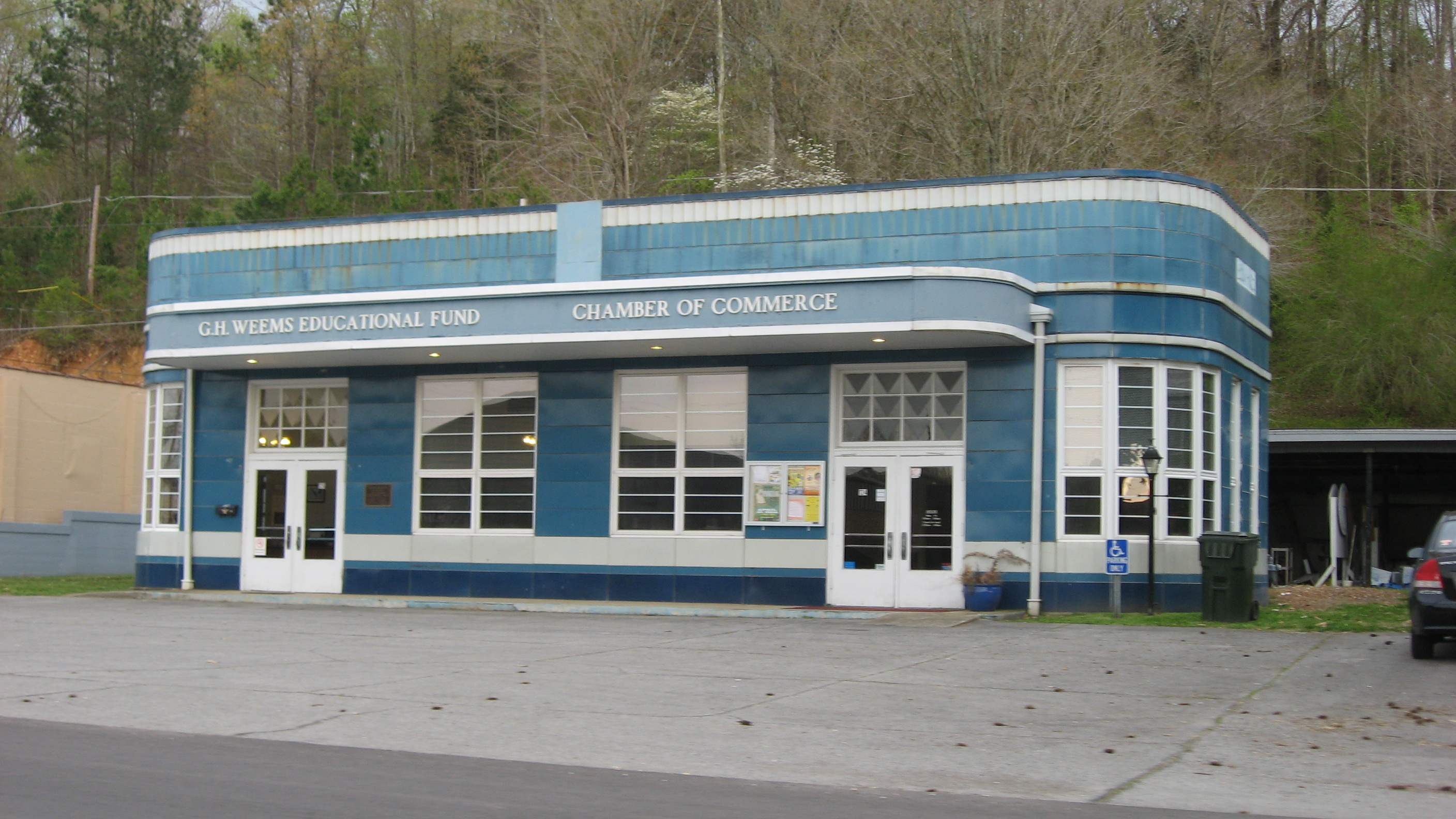
Greyhound Half-Way House, Waverly, Tennessee (2014 photo)

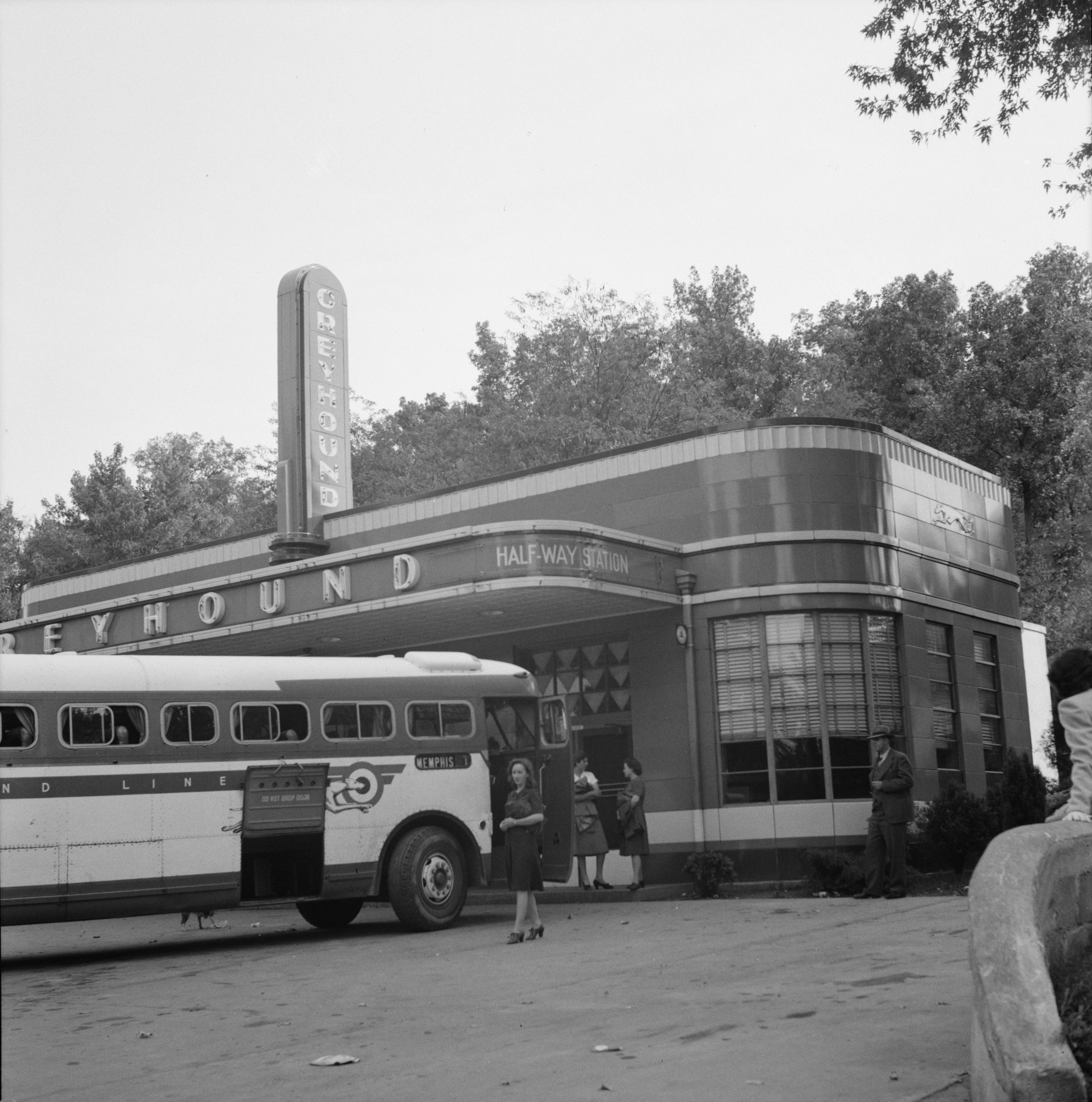
A Greyhound bus stops at the Half-Way House, September 1943

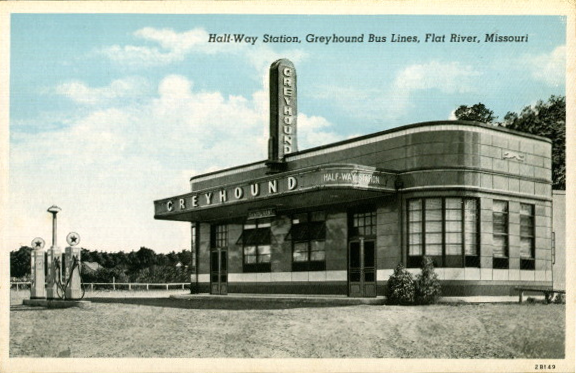
Greyhound Half-Way Station, Flat River, Missouri. 1940s postcard view.

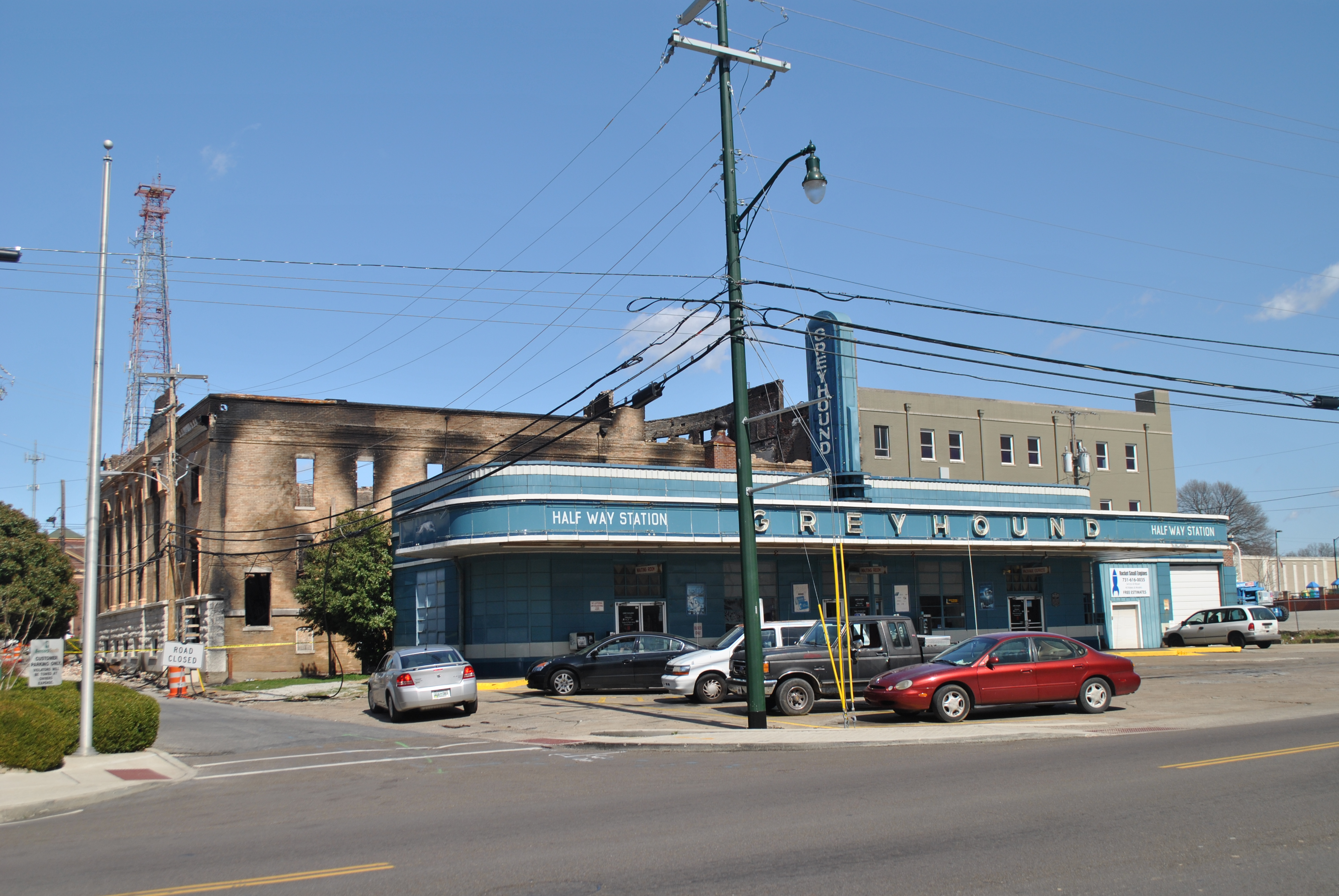
Greyhound Half-Way Station, Jackson, Tennessee

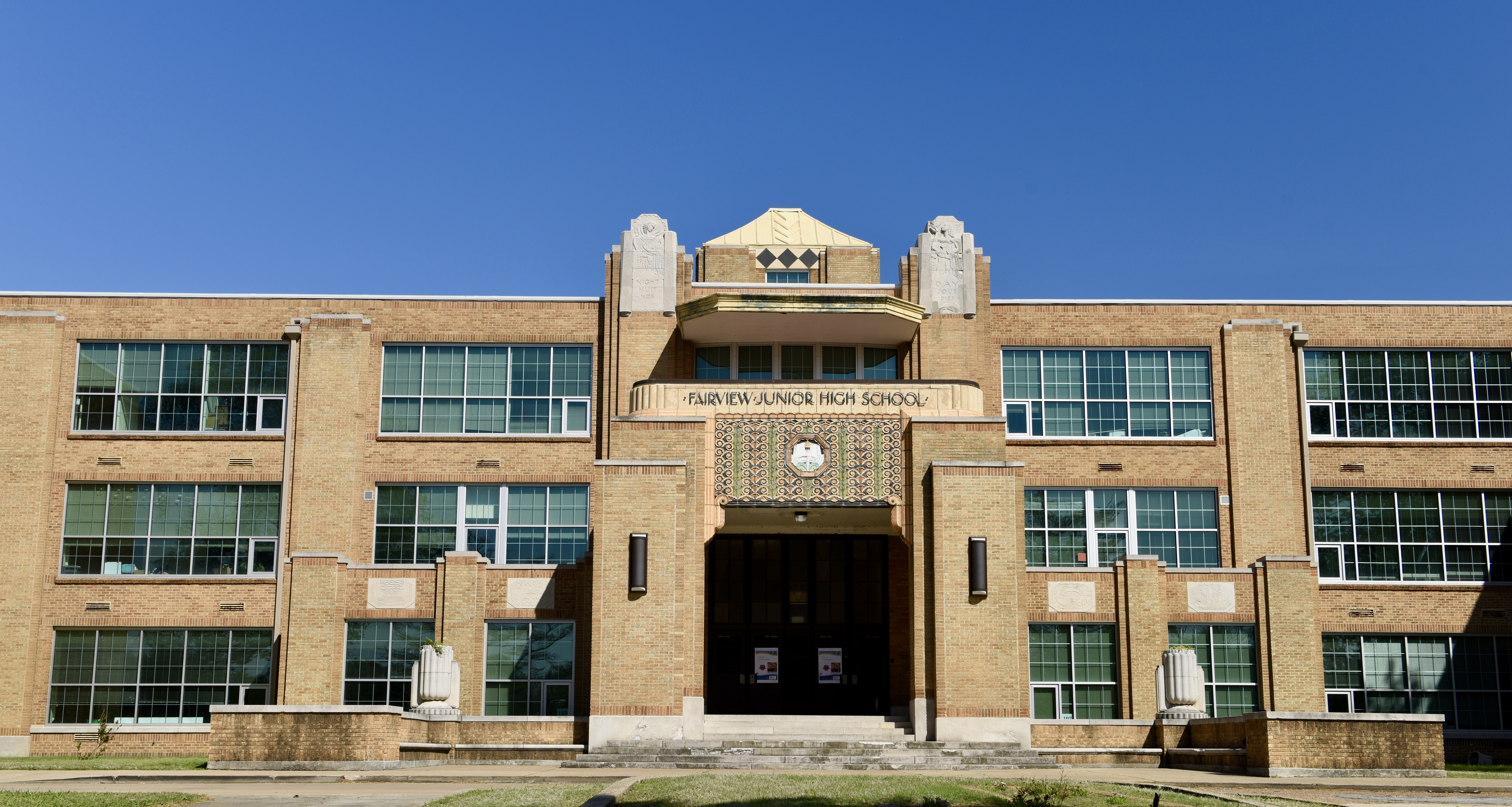
Fairview Junior High School, Memphis, designed c. 1930 while employed at Firm of Edward Lee Harrison
NRHP 87000447

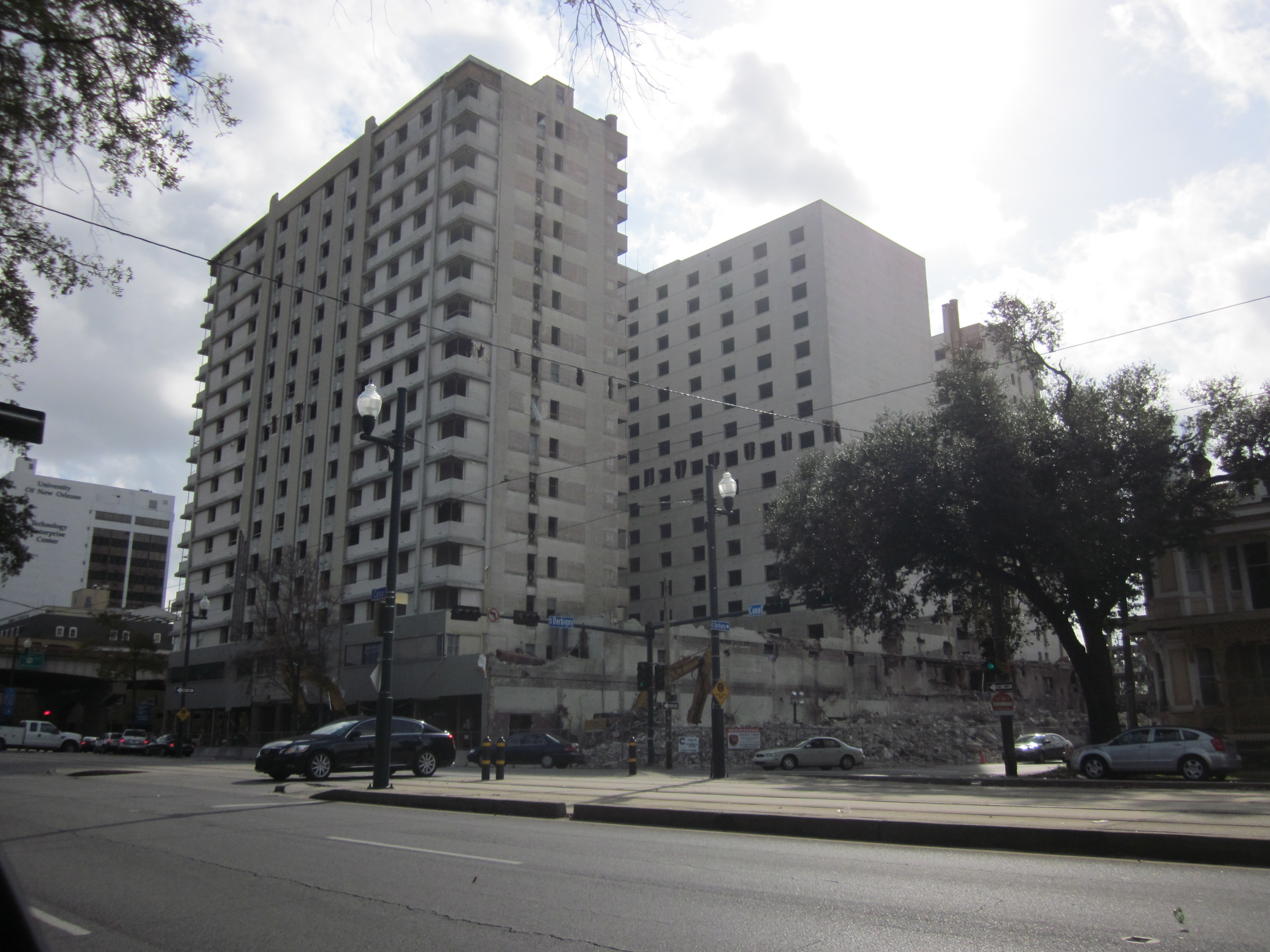
Claiborne Towers, New Orleans, during its December 2011 demolition

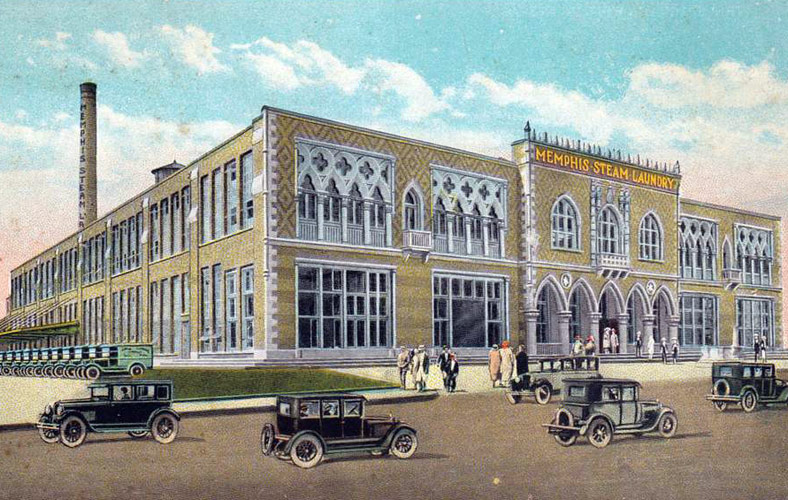
Postcard view (c. 1930) of the Memphis Steam Laundry, 941 Jefferson Ave, Memphis TN, shortly after its completion in 1927

== Maritime art ==
Van Powell was the author of The American Navies of the Revolutionary War, a collection of his paintings, with descriptive notes by the artist published in 1974 by G. P. Putnam's Sons, New York.

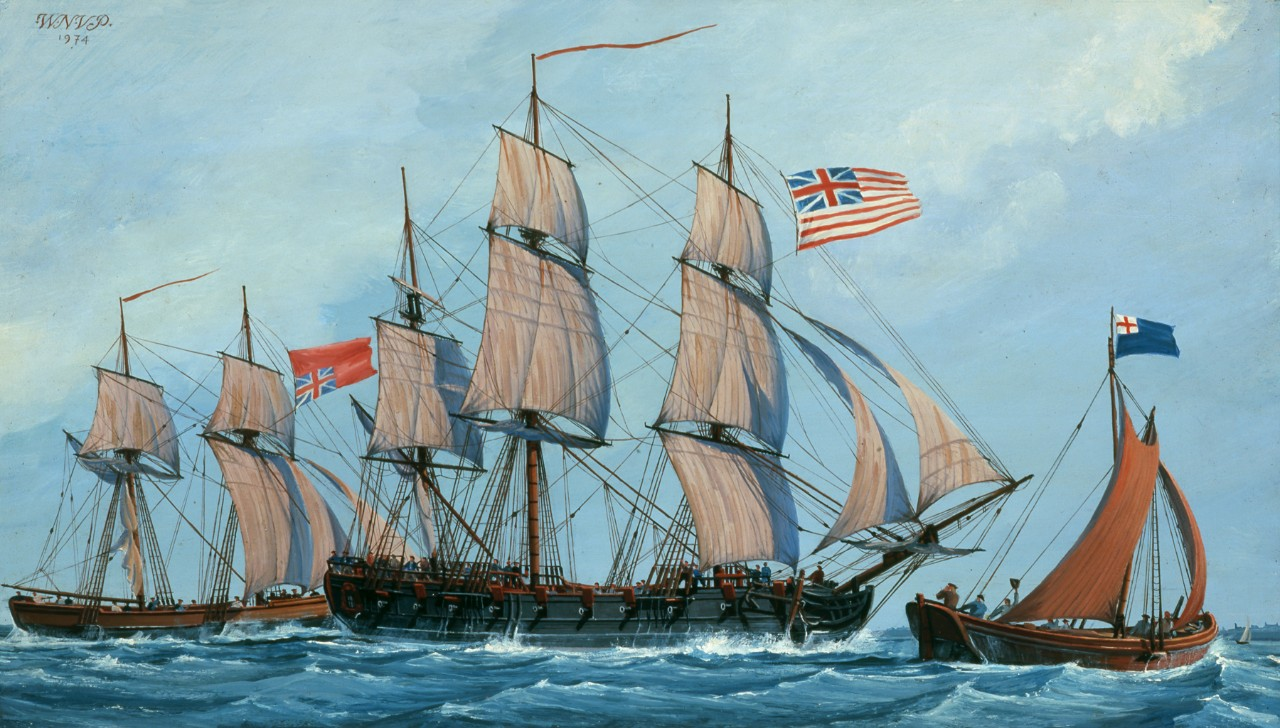
USS Columbus

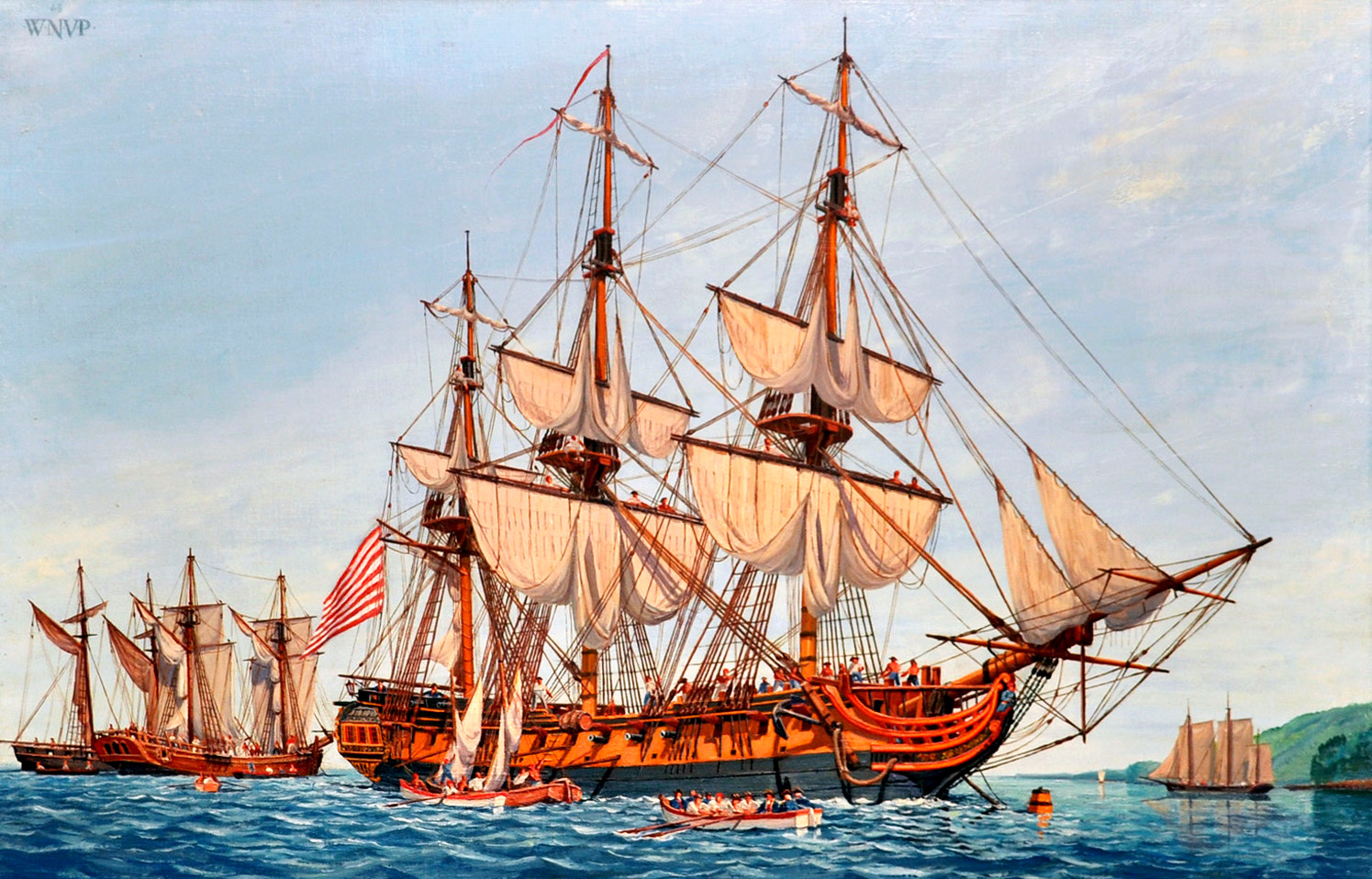
USS Confederacy

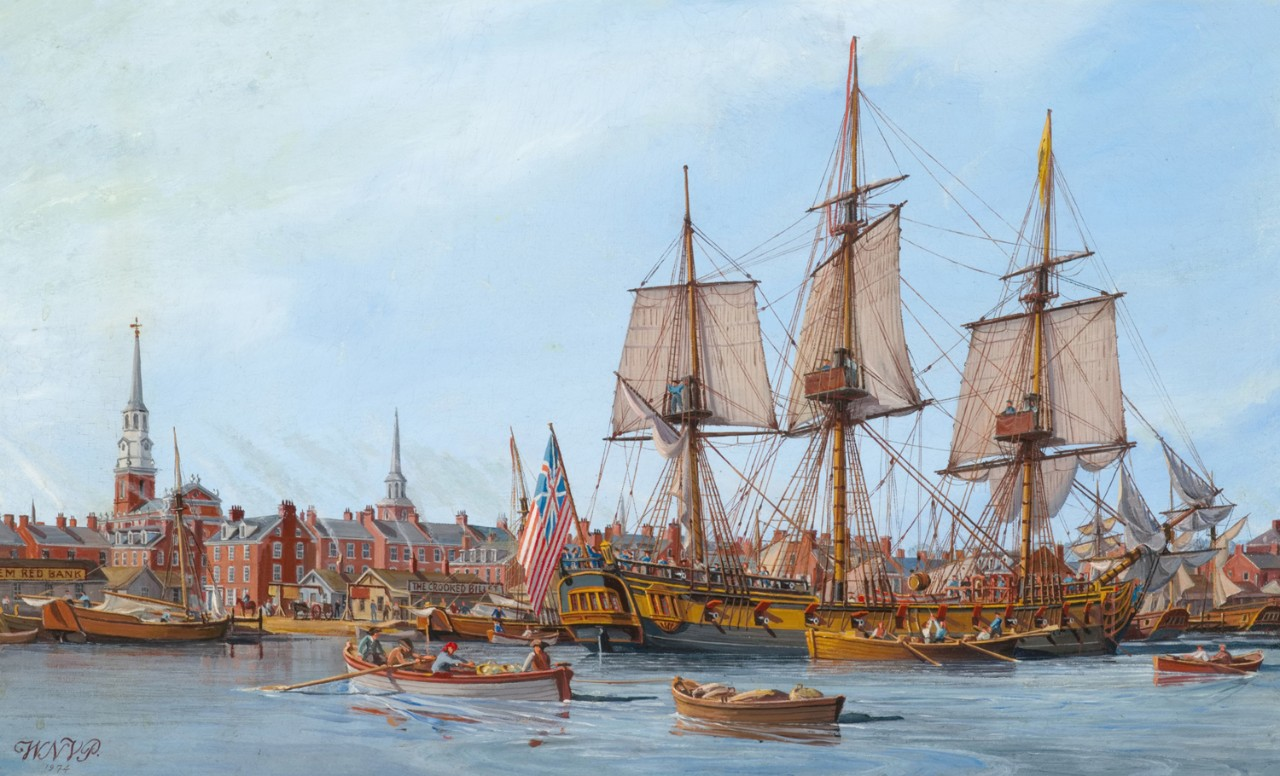
USS Alfred

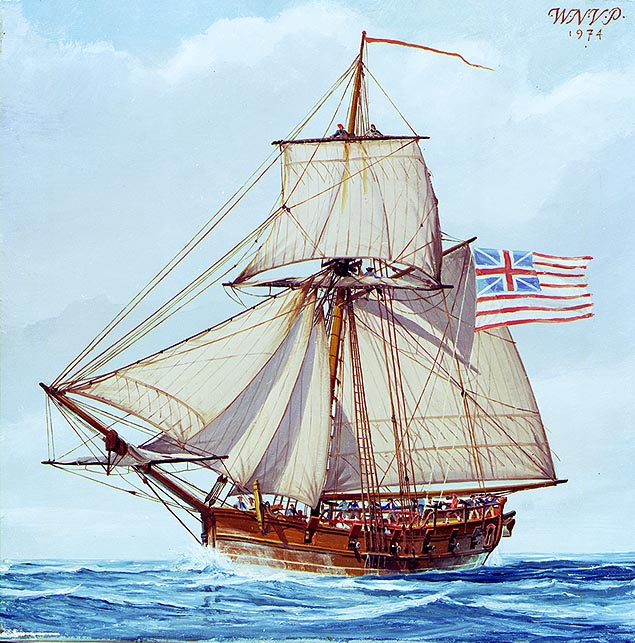
USS Providence

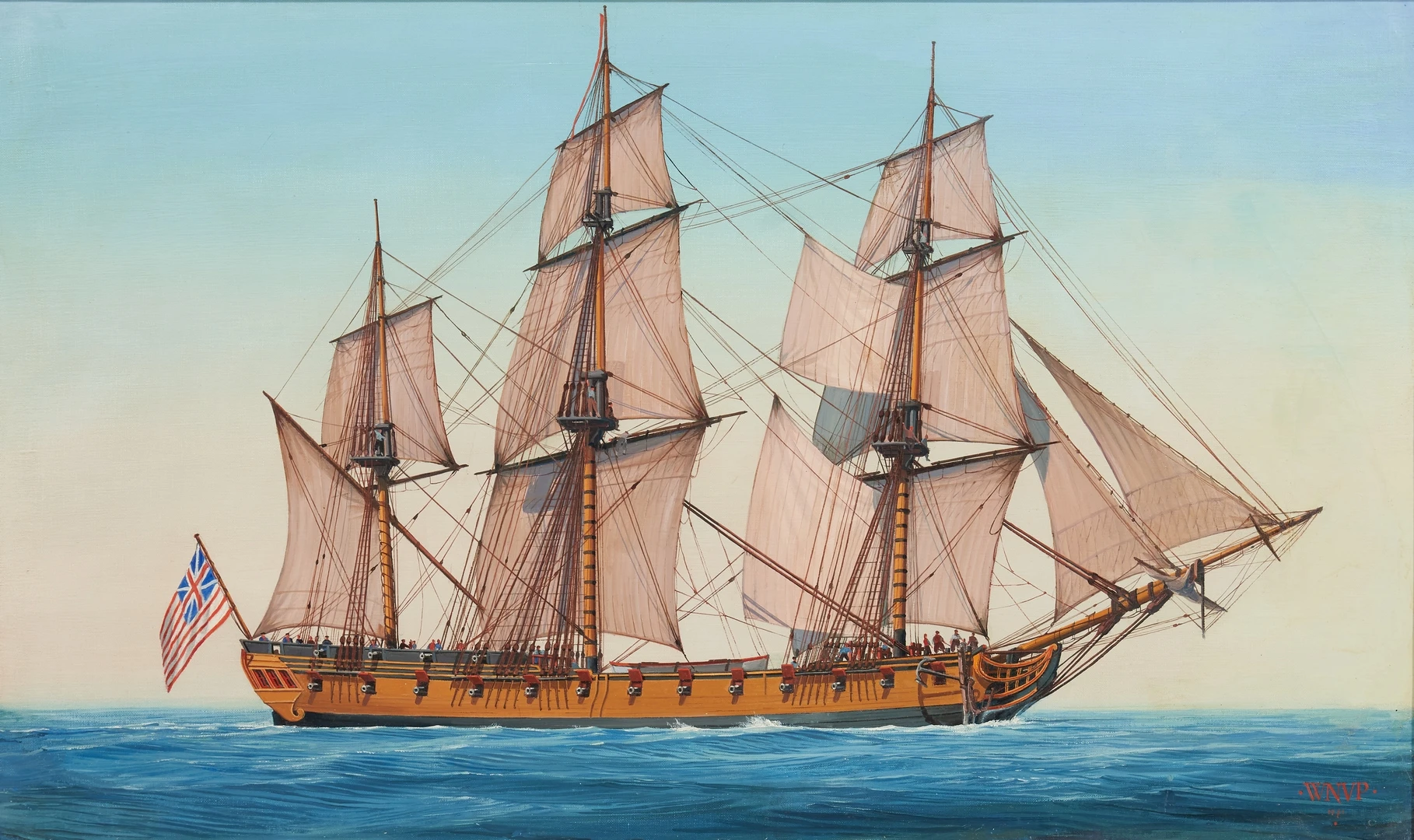
USS Randolph

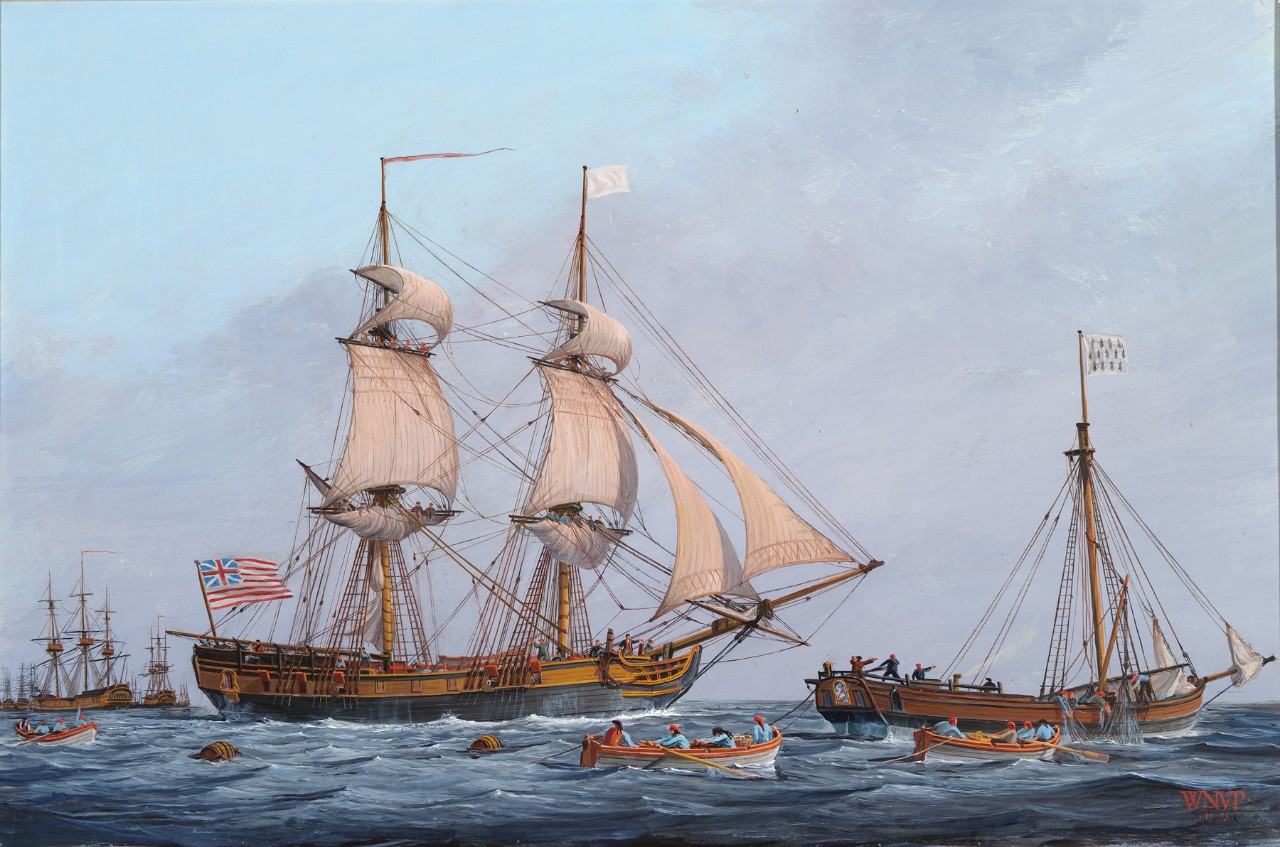
USS Reprisal
