= Naval battles of the American Revolutionary War =

American Revolutionary War battles involving British, French, and U.S. navies

- Part of the American Revolutionary War
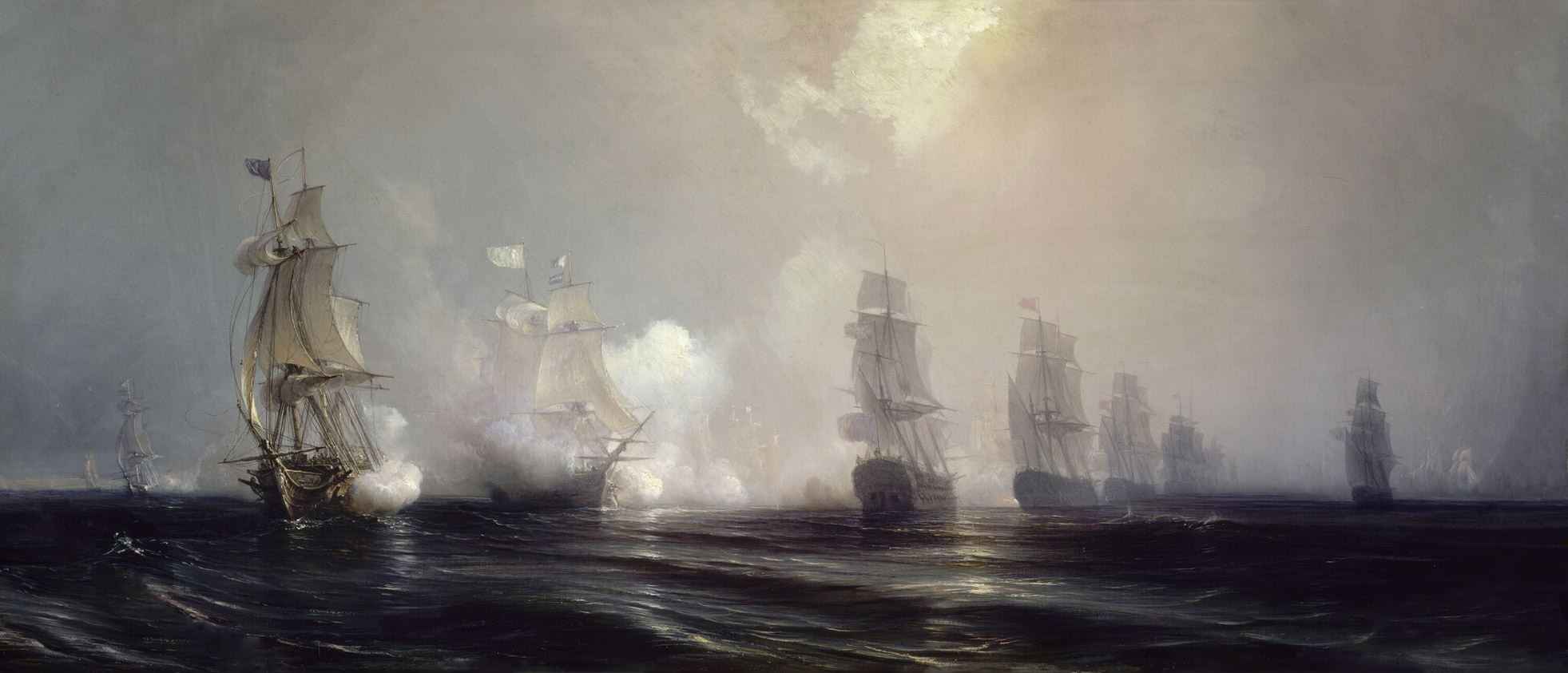
- Naval battle off the Chesapeake, 3 September 1781; Théodore Gudin
Date	1775–1783
Location	British America, Atlantic Ocean
Result	See § Aftermath

Belligerents
United Colonies (1775‍–‍1776); United States (1776‍–‍1783); France; Spain; Dutch Republic	Great Britain

Commanders and leaders
Esek Hopkins; John Paul Jones; Comte d'Estaing; Comte De Grasse; (Spain) Luis de Córdova y Córdova; (Dutch Republic) Johan Zoutman	Lord Howe; George Collier; Mariot Arbuthnot; Thomas Graves

The American Revolutionary War saw a series of battles involving naval forces of the British Royal Navy and the Continental Navy from 1775, and of the French Navy from 1778 onwards. Although the British enjoyed more numerical victories, these battles culminated in the surrender of the British Army force of Lieutenant-General Earl Charles Cornwallis, an event that led directly to the beginning of serious peace negotiations and the eventual end of the war. From the start of the hostilities, the British North American station under Vice-Admiral Samuel Graves blockaded the major colonial ports and carried raids against patriot communities. Colonial forces could do little to stop these developments due to British naval supremacy. In 1777, colonial privateers made raids into British waters capturing merchant ships, which they took into French and Spanish ports, although both were officially neutral. Seeking to challenge Britain, France signed two treaties with America in February 1778, but stopped short of declaring war on Britain. The risk of a French invasion forced the British to concentrate its forces in the English Channel, leaving its forces in North America vulnerable to attacks.

France officially entered the war on 17 June 1778, and the French ships sent to the Western Hemisphere spent most of the year in the West Indies, and only sailed to the Thirteen Colonies from July until November. In the first Franco-American campaign, a French fleet commanded by Vice-Admiral Comte Charles Henri Hector d'Estaing attempted landings in New York and Newport, but due to a combination of poor coordination and bad weather, d'Estaing and Vice-Admiral Lord Richard Howe naval forces did not engage during 1778. After the French fleet departed, the British turned their attention to the south. In 1779, the French fleet returned to assist American forces attempting to recapture Savannah from British forces, however failing leading the British victors to remain in control till late 1782.

In 1780, another fleet and 6,000 troops commanded by Lieutenant-General Comte Jean-Baptiste de Rochambeau, landed at Newport, and shortly afterwards was blockaded by the British. In early 1781, General George Washington and the comte de Rochambeau planned an attack against the British in the Chesapeake Bay area coordinated with the arrival of a large fleet commanded by Vice-Admiral Comte François Joseph Paul de Grasse from the West Indies. British Vice-Admiral Sir George Brydges Rodney, who had been tracking de Grasse around the West Indies, was alerted to the latter's departure, but was uncertain of the French admiral's destination. Believing that de Grasse would return a portion of his fleet to Europe, Rodney detached Rear-Admiral Sir Samuel Hood and 15 ships of the line with orders to find de Grasse's destination in North America. Rodney, who was ill, sailed for Europe with the rest of his fleet in order to recover, refit his fleet, and to avoid the Atlantic hurricane season.

British naval forces in North America and the West Indies were weaker than the combined fleets of France and Spain, and, after much indecision by British naval commanders, the French fleet gained control over Chesapeake Bay, landing forces near Yorktown. The Royal Navy attempted to dispute this control in the key Battle of the Chesapeake on 5 September but Rear-Admiral Thomas Graves was defeated. Protected from the sea by French ships, Franco-American forces surrounded, besieged and forced the surrender of British forces commanded by General Cornwallis, concluding major operations in North America. When the news reached London, the government of Lord Frederick North fell, and the following Rockingham ministry entered into peace negotiations. These culminated in the Treaty of Paris in 1783, in which King George III recognised the independence of the United States of America.

== Early actions, 1775–1778 ==
=== First skirmishes ===
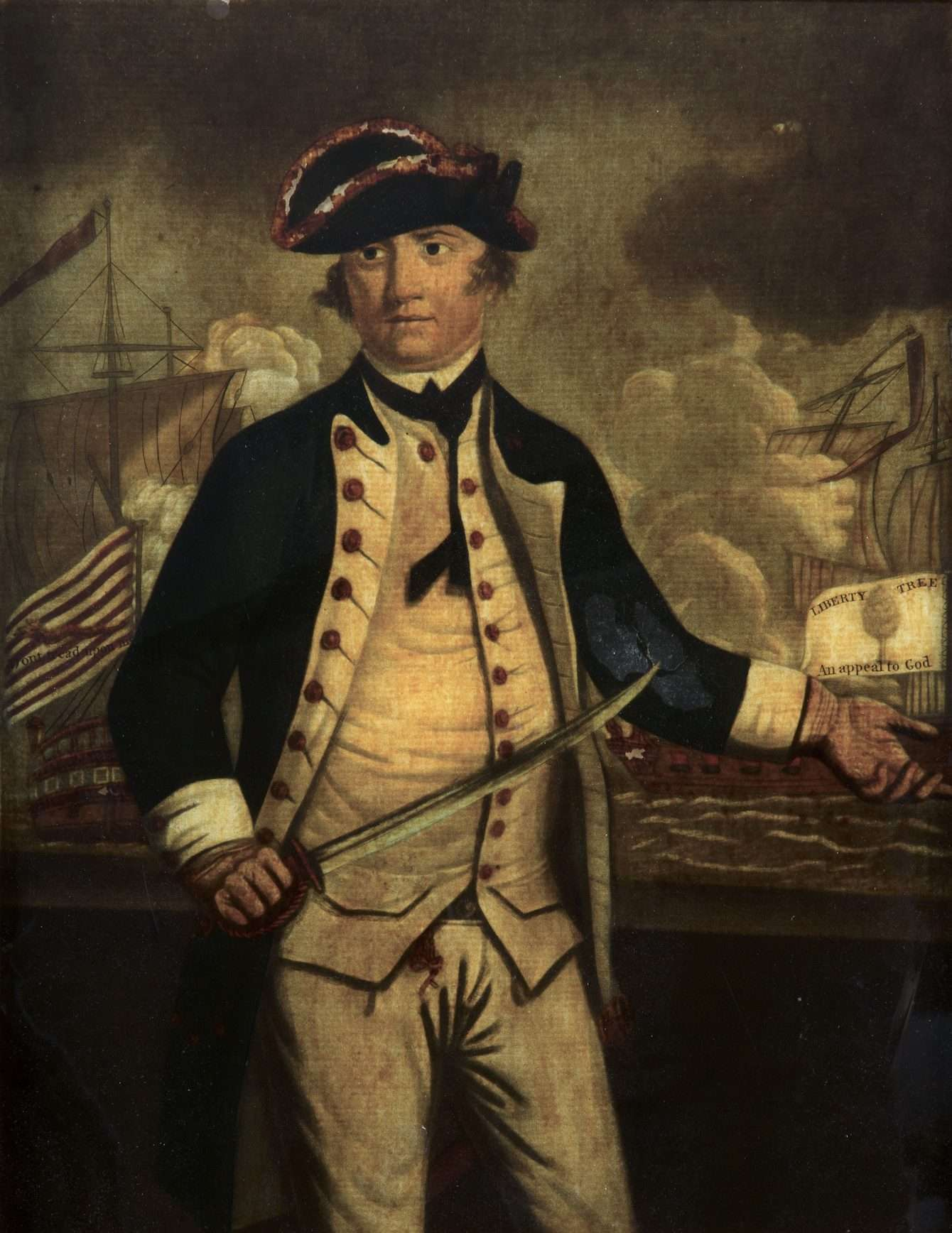
Esek Hopkins, the Continental Navy's first and only commander-in-chief

The Battle of Lexington and Concord on 19 April 1775 drew thousands of militia forces from throughout New England to the towns surrounding Boston. These men remained in the area and their numbers grew, placing the British forces in Boston under siege when they blocked all land access to the peninsula. The British were still able to sail in supplies from Nova Scotia, Providence, and other places because the harbour remained under British naval control. Colonial forces could do nothing to stop these shipments due to the naval supremacy of the British fleet and the complete absence of any sort of rebel armed vessels in the spring of 1775. (Note: Formal naval organisation did not begin until Washington took command in June 1775 (Callo 2006, pp. 22–23).) Nevertheless, while the British were able to resupply the city by sea, the inhabitants and the British forces were on short rations, and prices rose quickly Vice-Admiral Samuel Graves commanded the Royal Navy around occupied Boston under overall leadership of Governor General Thomas Gage. Graves had hired storage on Noddle's Island for a variety of important naval supplies, hay and livestock, which he felt were important to preserve, owing to the "almost impossibility of replacing them at this Juncture".

During the siege, with the supplies in the city running shorter by the day, British troops were sent to the Boston Harbour to raid farms for supplies. Graves, apparently acting on intelligence that the Colonials might make attempts on the islands, posted guard boats near Noddle's Island. These were longboats that included detachments of Marines. Sources disagree as to whether or not any regulars or marines were stationed on Noddle's Island to protect the naval supplies. (Note: For example, Nelson 2008, p. 19, claims that no troops were stationed on Noddle's and Ketchum 1999, p. 69, implies as much. A Documentary History of Chelsea states (in testimony from British General Charles Sumner) that marines were present on the island.) In response, the Colonials began clearing Noddle's Island and Hog Island of anything useful to the British. (Note: This crossing was effected without Graves' guard boats taking notice (Nelson 2008, p. 18).) Graves on his flagship HMS Preston, taking notice of this, signalled for the guard marines to land on Noddle's island and ordered the armed schooner Diana, under the command of his nephew Lieutenant Thomas Graves, to sail up Chelsea Creek to cut off the colonists' route. This contested action resulted in the loss of two British soldiers and the capture and burning of Diana. This setback prompted Graves to move HMS Somerset, which had been stationed in the shallow waters between Boston and Charlestown, into deeper waters to the east of Boston, where it would have improved manoeuvrability if fired upon from land. He also belatedly sent a detachment of regulars to secure Noddle's Island; the colonists had long before removed or destroyed anything of value on the island.

The need for building materials and other supplies led Admiral Graves to authorise a loyalist merchant to send his two ships Unity and Polly from Boston to Machias in the District of Maine, escorted by the armed schooner Margaretta under the command of James Moore, a midshipman from Graves' flagship Preston. Moore also carried orders to recover what he could from the wreck of HMS Halifax, which had apparently been run aground in Machias Bay by a patriot pilot in February 1775. After a heated negotiation, the Machias townspeople seized the merchant vessels and the schooner after a short battle in which Moore was killed. Jeremiah O'Brien immediately outfitted one of the three captured vessels (Note: Sources disagree on which vessel; Polly and Unity are both mentioned; Volo 2008, p. 41, suggests that recent scholarship favours Polly (Drisko 1904, p. 50; Benedetto 2006, p. 94).) with breastwork, (Note: In warships, a breastwork refers to the armoured superstructure in the middle of the ship that did not extend all the way out to the sides of the ship) armed her with the guns and swivels taken from Margaretta and changed her name to Machias Liberty. In July 1775, Jeremiah O'Brien and Benjamin Foster captured two more British armed schooners, Diligent and Tatamagouche, whose officers had been captured when they came ashore near Bucks Harbour. In August 1775, the Provincial Congress formally recognised their efforts, commissioning both Machias Liberty and Diligent into the Massachusetts Navy, with Jeremiah O'Brien as their commander. The community would be a base for privateering until the war's end.

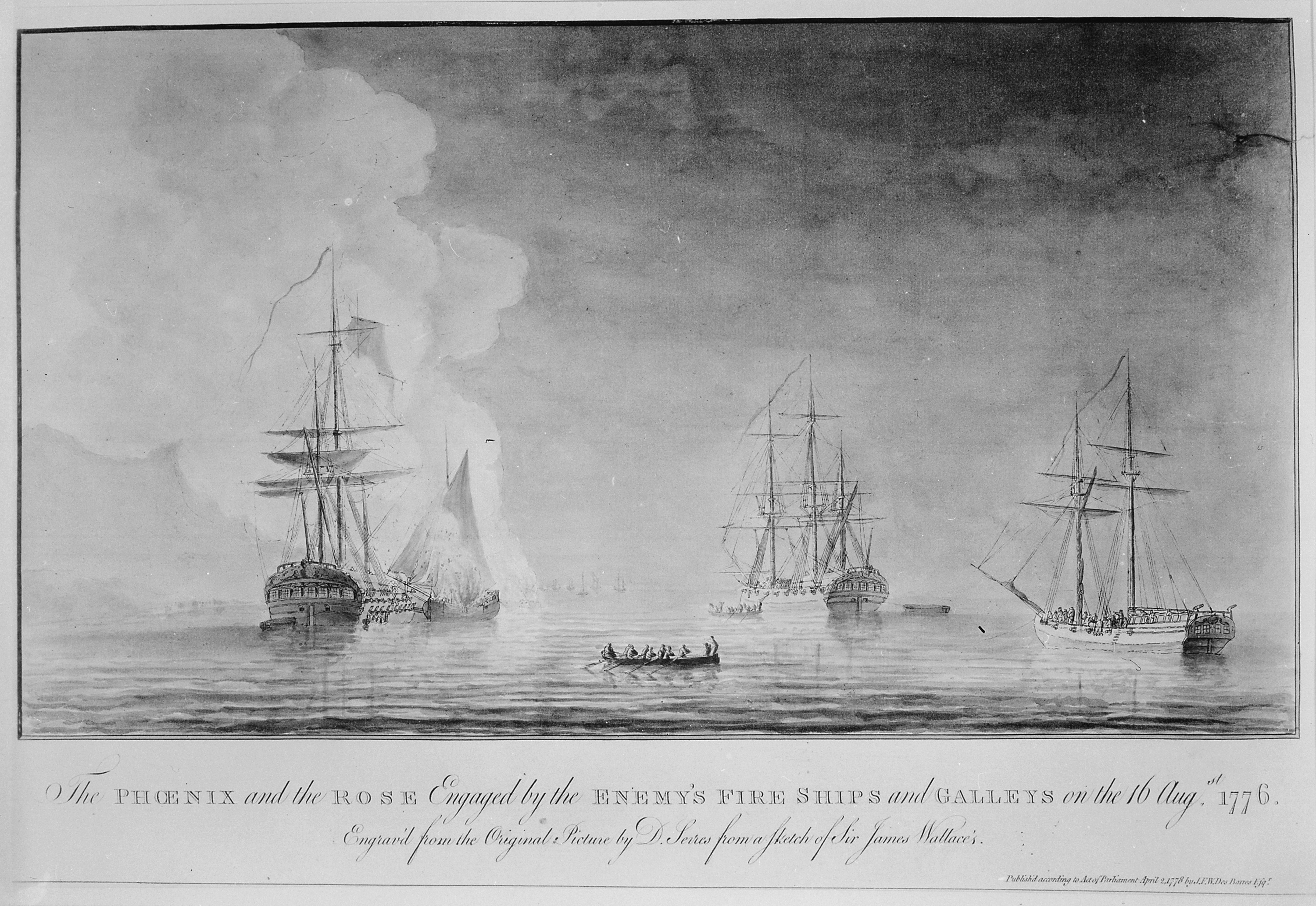
British ships Phoenix and Rose engaged by colonial fire ships and galleys

Their resistance, and that of other coastal communities, led Graves to authorise a reprisal expedition in October whose sole significant act was the Burning of Falmouth. On 30 August, Royal Naval Captain James Wallace, commanding Rose fired into the town of Stonington, after the townspeople there prevented Rose's tender from capturing a vessel it had chased into the harbour. Wallace also fired on the town of Bristol, in October, after its townspeople refused to deliver livestock to him. The outrage in the colonies over these action contributed to the passing of legislation by the Second Continental Congress that established the Continental Navy. The US Navy recognises 13 October 1775, as the date of its official establishment; the Second Continental Congress had established the Continental Navy in late 1775. On this day, Congress authorised the purchase of two armed vessels for a cruise against British merchant ships; these ships became Andrew Doria and Cabot. The first ship in commission was Alfred purchased on 4 November and commissioned on 3 December by Captain Dudley Saltonstall. John Adams drafted its first governing regulations, adopted by Congress on 28 November 1775, which remained in effect throughout the Revolution. The Rhode Island resolution, reconsidered by the Continental Congress, passed on 13 December 1775, authorising the building of thirteen frigates within the next three months, five ships of 32 guns, five with 28 guns and three with 24 guns.

=== Foundation of the Continental Navy ===
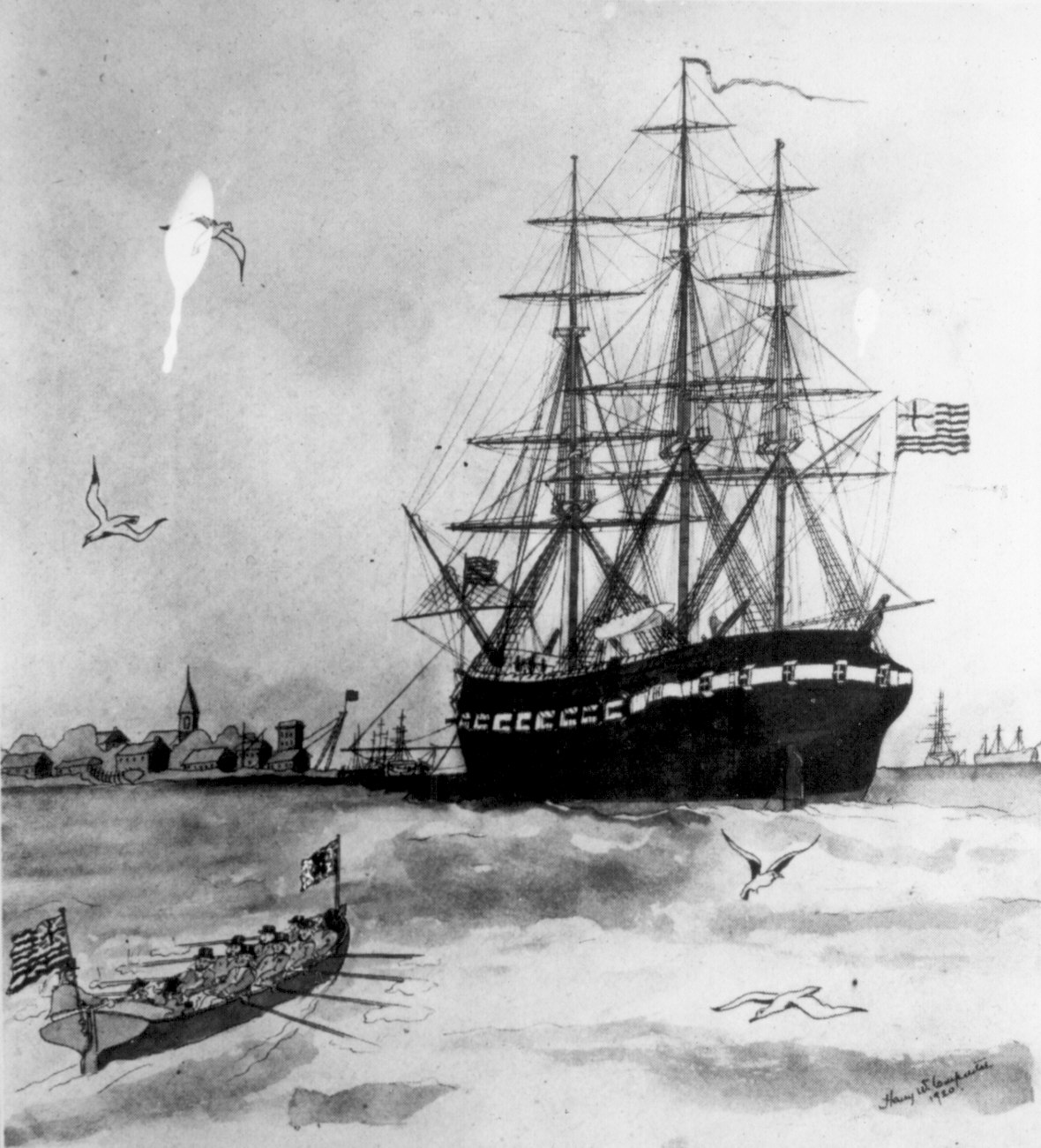
Alfred, one of the first ships in the Continental Navy preparing for her maiden voyage

The desperate shortage of gunpowder available to the Continental Army had led the Congress to organise a naval expedition, one of whose goals was the seizure of the military supplies at Nassau. While the orders issued by the Congress to Esek Hopkins, the fleet captain selected to lead the expedition, included only instructions for patrolling and raiding British naval targets on the Virginia and Carolina coastline, additional instructions may have been given to Hopkins in secret meetings of the Congress' Naval Committee. The instructions that Hopkins issued to his fleet's captains before it sailed from Cape Henlopen, Delaware on February 17, 1776, included instructions to rendezvous at Great Abaco Island in the Bahamas. The fleet that Hopkins launched consisted of: Alfred, Hornet, Wasp, Fly, Andrew Doria, Cabot, Providence, and Columbus. In addition to ships' crews, it carried 200 marines under the command of Samuel Nicholas. In early March, the fleet (reduced by one due to tangled rigging en route) landed marines on the island of New Providence and captured the town of Nassau in the Bahamas. After loading the fleet's ships, (enlarged to include two captured prize ships), with military stores, the fleet sailed north on 17 March, with one ship dispatched to Philadelphia, while the rest of the fleet sailed for the Block Island channel, with Governor Browne and other officials as prisoners. Outbreaks of a variety of diseases, including fevers and smallpox, resulting in significant reductions in crew effectiveness, marked the fleet's cruise.

The return voyage was uneventful until the fleet reached the waters off Long Island. On 4 April, the fleet encountered and captured a prize, Hawk, which was laden with supplies. The next day brought a second prize Bolton, which was also laden with stores that included more armaments and powder. Hoping to catch more easy prizes, Hopkins continued to cruise off Block Island that night, forming the fleet into a scouting formation of two columns. The need to man the prizes further reduced the fighting effectiveness of the fleet's ships. The fleet finally met resistance on April 6, when it encountered the Glasgow, a heavily armed sixth-rate ship. In the ensuing action, the outnumbered Glasgow managed to escape capture, severely damaging the Cabot in the process, wounding her captain, Hopkins' son John Burroughs Hopkins, and killing or wounding eleven others. Andrew Doria's Captain Nicholas Biddle described the battle as "helter-skelter". They reached New London on 8 April.

Although Continental Congress President John Hancock praised Hopkins for the fleet's performance, its failure to capture Glasgow gave opponents of the Navy in and out of Congress opportunities for criticism. Nicholas Biddle wrote of the action, "A more imprudent, ill-conducted affair never happened". Abraham Whipple, captain of Columbus, endured rumours and accusations of cowardice for a time, but eventually asked for a court-martial to clear his name. Held on 6 May by a panel consisting of officers who had been on the cruise, he was cleared of cowardice, although he was criticised for errors of judgment. John Hazard, captain of Providence, was not so fortunate. Charged by his subordinate officers with a variety of offences, including neglect of duty during the Glasgow action, he was convicted by court-martial and forced to surrender his commission.

Commodore Hopkins came under scrutiny from Congress over matters unrelated to this action. He had violated his written orders by sailing to Nassau instead of Virginia and the Carolinas, and he had distributed the goods taken during the cruise to Connecticut and Rhode Island without consulting Congress. He was censured for these transgressions, and dismissed from the Navy in January 1778 after further controversies, including the fleet's failure to sail again (a number of its ships suffered from crew shortages, and also became trapped at Providence by the British occupation of Newport late in 1776). American forces were not strong enough to dislodge the British garrison there, which was also supported by British ships using Newport as a base.

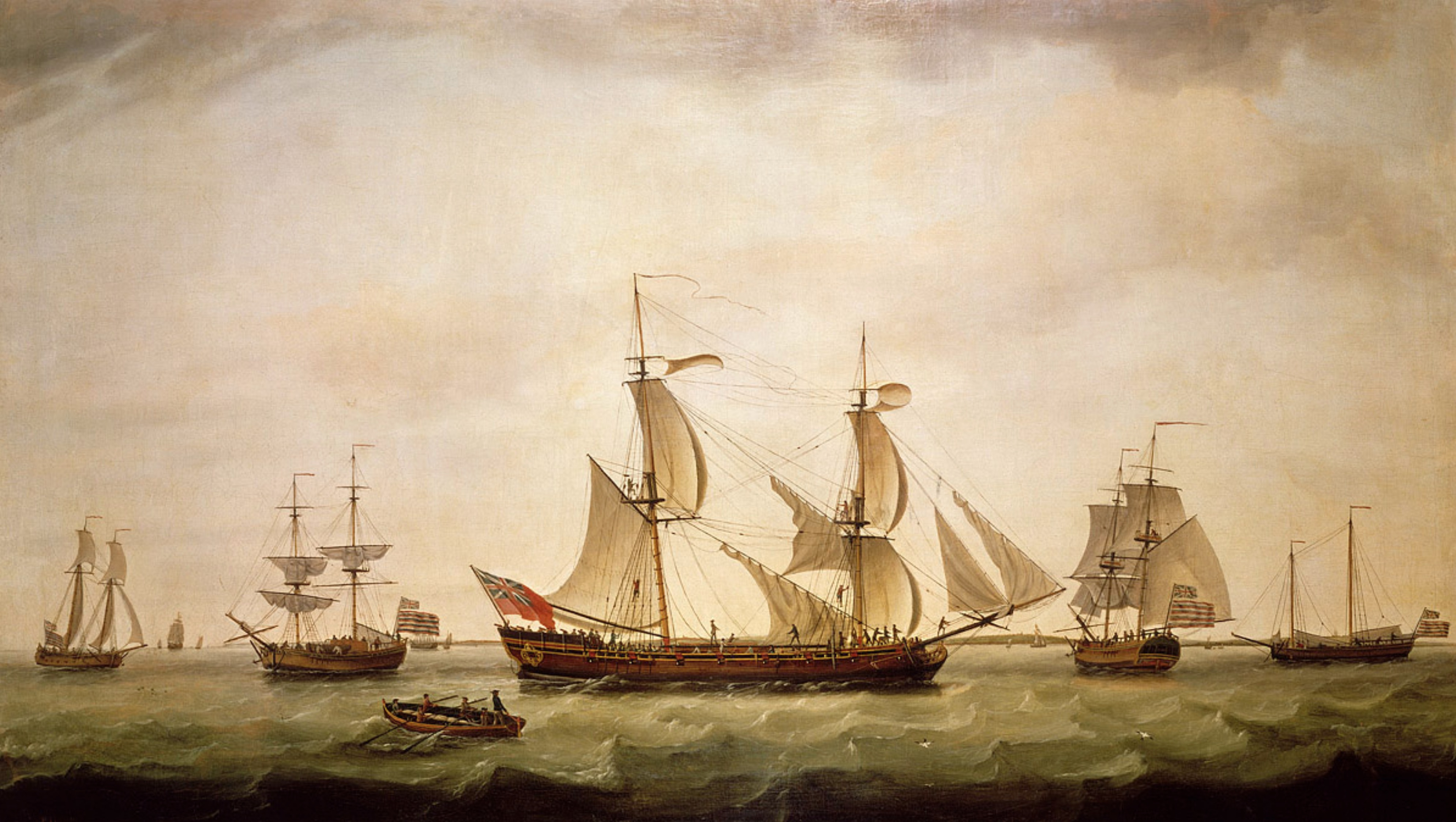
1778 painting by Francis Holman depicting a Royal Navy brig with captured American prizes

On Lake Champlain, Benedict Arnold supervised the construction of 12 vessels to protect access into Hudson River's uppermost navigable reaches from advancing British forces. A British fleet destroyed Arnold's in the Battle of Valcour Island, but the fleet's presence on the lake managed to slow down the British progression enough until winter came before they were able capture Fort Ticonderoga. By mid-1776, a number of ships, ranging up to and including the thirteen frigates approved by Congress, were under construction, but their effectiveness was limited; they were completely outmatched by the mighty Royal Navy, and nearly all were captured or sunk by 1781.

American privateers had some success with 1,697 letters of marque being issued by Congress. Individual states and American agents in Europe and in the Caribbean also issued commissions. Taking duplications into account, various authorities issued more than 2,000 commissions. Lloyd's of London estimated that American privateers captured 2,208 British ships, amounting to almost $66 million, a significant sum at the time.

== France enters the war, 1778–1780 ==
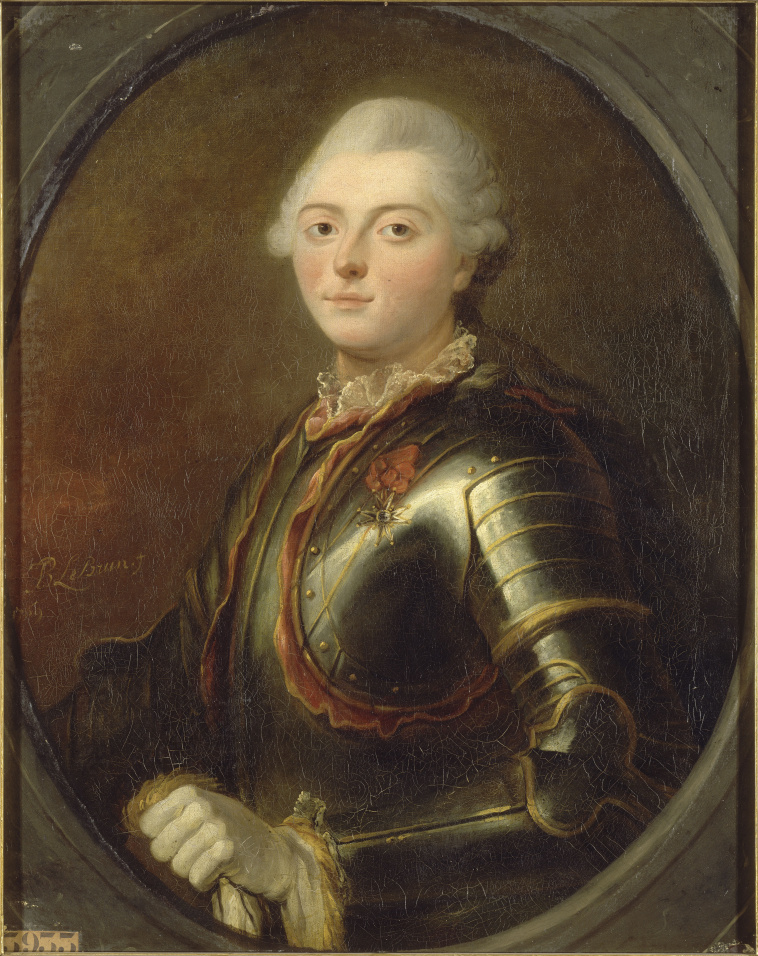
Comte d'Estaing, 1769 portrait by Jean-Baptiste Lebrun

=== French movements ===
For its first major attempt at co-operation with the Americans, France sent Vice-Admiral Comte Charles Henri Hector d'Estaing, with a fleet of 12 ships of the line and some French Army troops to North America in April 1778, with orders to blockade the British North American fleet in the Delaware River. Although British leaders had early intelligence that d'Estaing was likely headed for North America, political and military differences within the government and navy delayed the British response, allowing him to sail unopposed through the Straits of Gibraltar. It was not until early June that a fleet of 13 ships of the line under the command of Vice-Admiral John Byron left European waters in pursuit. D'Estaing's Atlantic crossing took three months, but Byron (who was called "Foul-weather Jack" due to his repeated bad luck with the weather) was also delayed by bad weather and did not reach New York until mid-August.

The British evacuated Philadelphia to New York City before d'Estaing's arrival, and their North American fleet was no longer in the river when his fleet arrived at Delaware Bay in early July. D'Estaing decided to sail for New York, but its well-defended harbour presented a daunting challenge to the French fleet. Since the French and their American pilots believed his largest ships were unable to cross the sandbar into New York harbour, their leaders decided to deploy their forces against British-occupied Newport, Rhode Island. While d'Estaing was outside the harbour, British Lieutenant-General Sir Henry Clinton and Vice-Admiral Lord Richard Howe dispatched a fleet of transports carrying 2,000 troops to reinforce Newport via Long Island Sound; these reached their destination on 15 July, raising the size of Major General Sir Robert Pigot's garrison to over 6,700 men.

=== French arrival at Newport ===
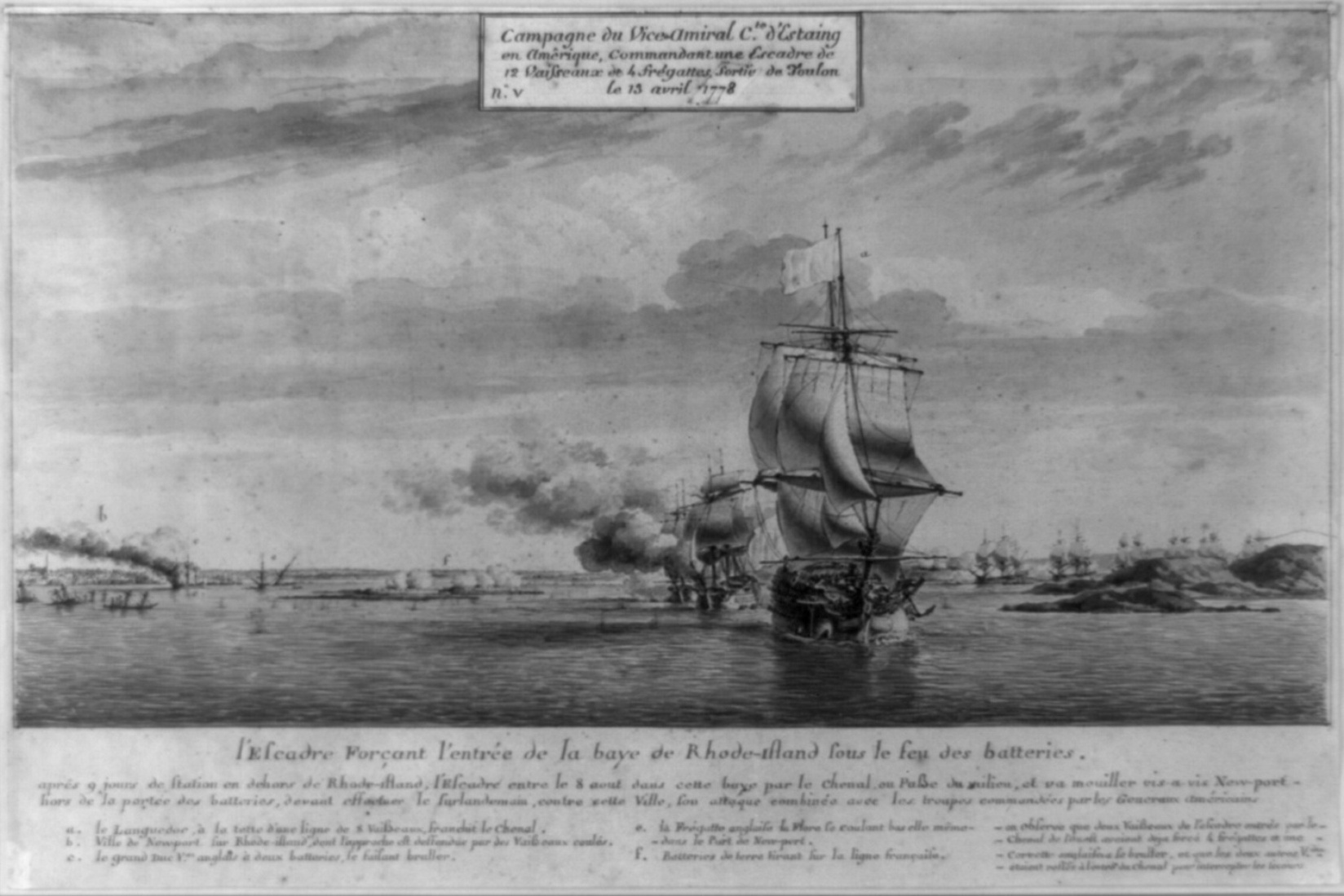
Arrival of d'Estaing's squadron at Newport on 8 August 1778. Engraving by Pierre Ozanne

On 22 July 1778, when the British judged the tide high enough for the French ships to cross the sandbar, d'Estaing sailed instead from his position outside New York harbour. He sailed south initially before turning northeast toward Newport. The British fleet in New York, eight ships of the line under the command of Lord Richard Howe, sailed out after him once they discovered his destination was Newport. D'Estaing arrived off Point Judith on 29 July, and immediately met with Major Generals Nathanael Greene and Gilbert du Motier, marquis de Lafayette, to develop a plan of attack. Major General John Sullivan's proposal was that the Americans would cross over to Aquidneck Island's (Rhode Island) eastern shore from Tiverton, while French troops using Conanicut Island as a staging ground, would cross from the west, cutting off a detachment of British soldiers at Butts Hill on the northern part of the island. The next day, d'Estaing sent frigates into the Sakonnet River (the channel to the east of Aquidneck) and into the main channel leading to Newport.

As allied intentions became clear, General Pigot decided to redeploy his forces in a defensive posture, withdrawing troops from Conanicut Island and from Butts Hill. He also decided to move nearly all livestock into the city, ordered the levelling of orchards to provide a clear line of fire, and destroyed carriages and wagons. The arriving French ships drove several of his supporting ships aground, which were then burned to prevent their capture. As the French worked their way up the channel toward Newport, Pigot ordered the remaining ships scuttled to hamper French access to Newport's harbour. On 8 August d'Estaing moved the bulk of his fleet into Newport Harbour.

On 9 August d'Estaing began disembarking some of his 4,000 troops onto nearby Conanicut Island. The same day, General Sullivan learned that Pigot had abandoned Butts Hill. Contrary to the agreement with d'Estaing, Sullivan then crossed troops over to seize that high ground, concerned that the British might reoccupy it in strength. Although d'Estaing later approved of the action, his initial reaction, and that of some of his officers, was one of disapproval. John Laurens wrote that the action "gave much umbrage to the French officers". Sullivan was en route to a meeting with d'Estaing when the latter learned that Admiral Howe's fleet had arrived.

=== Storm damage ===
Lord Howe's fleet was delayed departing New York by contrary winds, and he arrived off Point Judith on 9 August. Since d'Estaing's fleet outnumbered Howe's, the French admiral, fearful that Howe would be further reinforced and eventually gain a numerical advantage, reboarded the French troops, and sailed out to do battle with Howe on 10 August. As the two fleets prepared to battle and manoeuvreered for position, the weather deteriorated, and a major storm broke out. Raging for two days, the storm scattered both fleets, severely damaging the French flagship. It also frustrated plans by Sullivan to attack Newport without French support on 11 August. While Sullivan awaited the return of the French fleet, he began siege operations, moving closer to the British lines on 15 August and opening trenches to the northeast of the fortified British line north of Newport the next day.

As the two fleets sought to regroup, individual ships encountered enemy ships, and there were several minor naval skirmishes; two French ships (including d'Estaing's flagship), already suffering storm damage, were badly mauled in these encounters. The French fleet regrouped off Delaware, and returned to Newport on 20 August, while the British fleet regrouped at New York.

Despite pressure from his captains to sail immediately for Boston to make repairs, Admiral d'Estaing instead sailed for Newport to inform the Americans he would be unable to assist them. Upon his arrival on 20 August he informed Sullivan, and rejected entreaties that the British could be compelled to surrender in just one or two days with their help. Of the decision, d'Estaing wrote: "It was [...] difficult to persuade oneself that about six thousand men well entrenched and with a fort before which they had dug trenches could be taken either in twenty-four hours or in two days". Any thought of the French fleet remaining at Newport was also opposed by d'Estaing's captains, with whom he had a difficult relationship because of his arrival in the navy at a high rank after service in the French army. D'Estaing sailed for Boston on 22 August.

=== D'Estaing reaches Boston ===
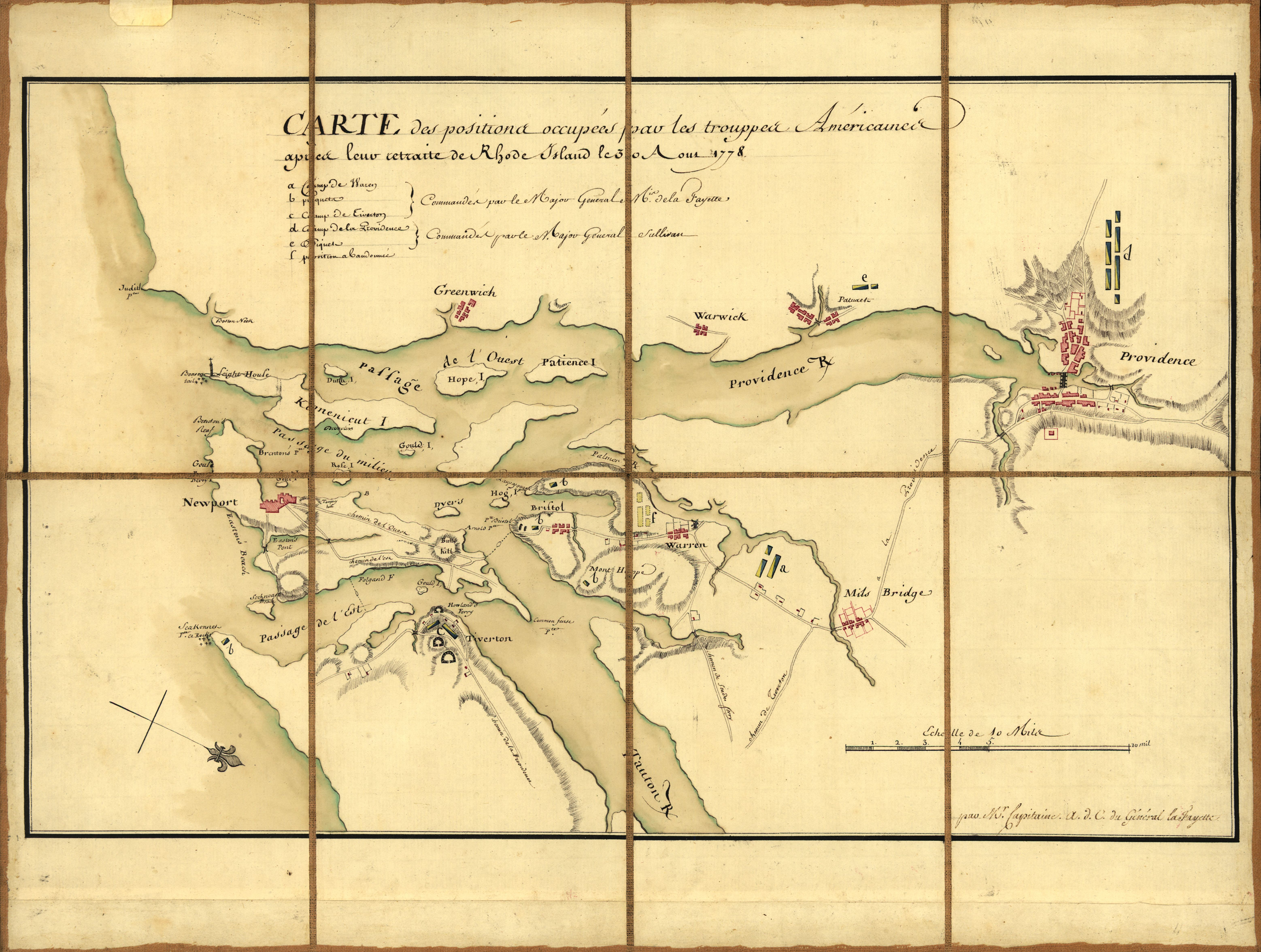
A 1778 French military map showing the positions of generals Lafayette and Sullivan around Newport Bay on 30 August 1778

The French decision brought on a wave of anger in the American ranks and its commanders. Although General Greene penned a complaint that John Laurens termed "sensible and spirited", General Sullivan was less diplomatic. In a missive containing much inflammatory language, he called d'Estaing's decision "derogatory to the honor of France", and included further complaints in orders of the day that were later suppressed when cooler heads prevailed. American writers from the ranks called the French decision a "desertion", and noted that they "left us in a most Rascally manner".

The French departure prompted a mass exodus of the American militia, significantly shrinking the American force. On 24 August, Sullivan was alerted by General George Washington that Clinton was assembling a relief force in New York. That evening his council made the decision to withdraw to positions on the northern part of the island. Sullivan continued to seek French assistance, dispatching Lafayette to Boston to negotiate further with d'Estaing.

In the meantime, the British in New York had not been idle. Lord Howe, concerned about the French fleet and further reinforced by the arrival of ships from Byron's storm-tossed squadron, sailed out to catch d'Estaing before he reached Boston. General Clinton organised a force of 4,000 men under Major General Charles Grey, and sailed with it on 26 August, destined for Newport.

The inflammatory writings of General Sullivan arrived before the French fleet reached Boston; Admiral d'Estaing's initial reaction was reported to be a dignified silence. Under pressure from Washington and the Continental Congress, politicians worked to smooth over the incident while d'Estaing was in good spirits when Lafayette arrived in Boston. D'Estaing even offered to march troops overland to support the Americans: "I offered to become a colonel of infantry, under the command of one who three years ago was a lawyer, and who certainly must have been an uncomfortable man for his clients".

General Pigot was harshly criticized by Clinton for failing to await the relief force, which might have successfully entrapped the Americans on the island. He left Newport for England not long after. Newport was abandoned by the British in October 1779 with economy ruined by the war.

=== Other actions ===
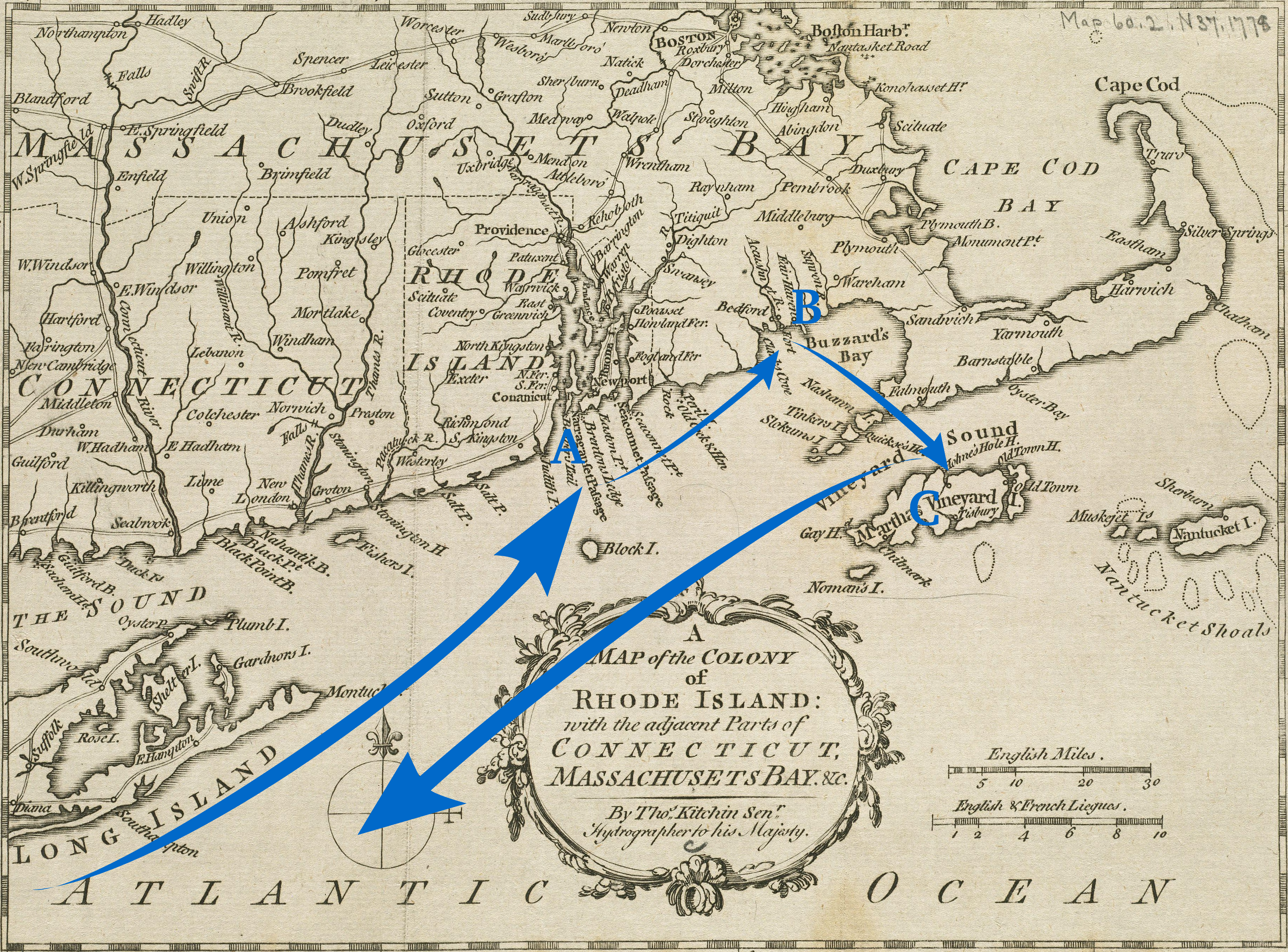
Grey's raid movements from Newport to New Bedford and Fairhaven ending at Martha's Vineyard and back to New York

The relief force of Clinton and Grey arrived at Newport on 1 September. Given that the threat was over, Clinton instead ordered Grey to raid several communities on the Massachusetts coast. Admiral Howe was unsuccessful in his bid to catch up with d'Estaing, who held a strong position at the Nantasket Roads when Howe arrived there on 30 August. Admiral Byron, who succeeded Howe as head of the New York station in September, was also unsuccessful in blockading d'Estaing: his fleet was scattered by a storm when it arrived off Boston, while d'Estaing sailed away, bound for the West Indies.

The British Navy in New York had not been inactive. Vice-Admiral Sir George Collier engaged in a number of amphibious raids against coastal communities from Chesapeake Bay to Connecticut, and probed at American defences in the Hudson River valley. Coming up the river in force, he supported the key outpost capture of Stony Point, but advanced no further. When Clinton weakened the garrison there to provide men for raiding expeditions, Washington organised a counterstrike. Brigadier General Anthony Wayne led a force that, solely using the bayonet, recaptured Stony Point. The Americans chose not to hold the post, but their morale was dealt a blow later in the year, when their failure to co-operate with the French led to an unsuccessful attempt to dislodge the British from Savannah. Control of Georgia was formally returned to its royal governor, James Wright, in July 1779, but the backcountry would not come under British control until after the 1780 Siege of Charleston. Patriot forces recovered Augusta by siege in 1781, but Savannah remained in British hands until 1782. The damage sustained at Savannah forced Marseillois, Zélé, Sagittaire, Protecteur and Experiment to return to Toulon for repairs.

John Paul Jones in April 1778 led a raid on the western English town of Whitehaven, representing the first engagement by American forces outside of North America.

== Yorktown Campaign ==
=== French and American planning for 1781 ===
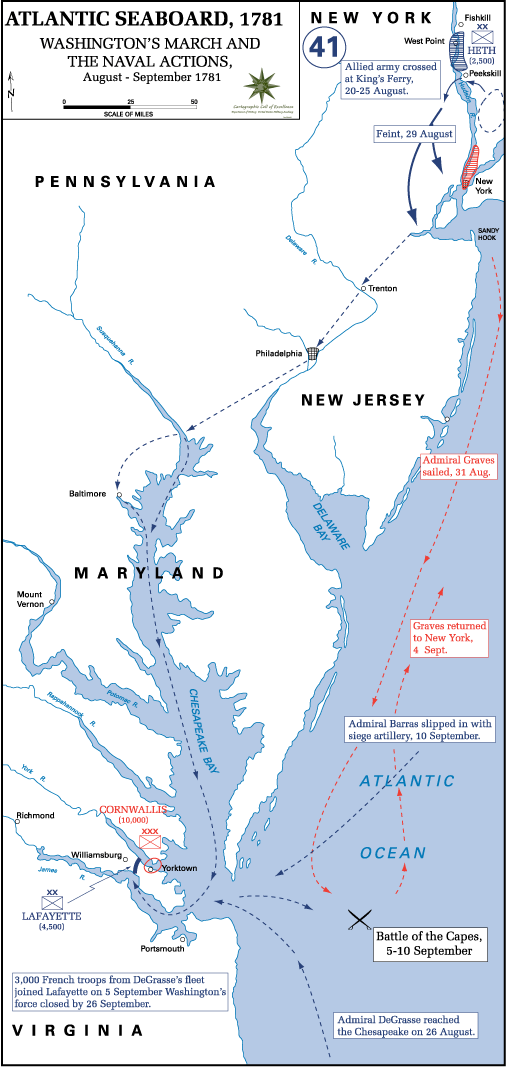
Map of the eastern seaboard showing naval movements during the campaign

French military planners had to balance competing demands for the 1781 campaign. After the unsuccessful American attempts of co-operation leading to failed assaults at Rhode Island and Savannah, they realised more active participation in North America was needed. However, they also needed to co-ordinate their actions with Spain, where there was potential interest in making an assault on the British stronghold of Jamaica. It turned out that the Spanish were not interested in operations against Jamaica until after they had dealt with an expected British attempt to reinforce besieged Gibraltar, and merely wanted to be informed of the movements of the West Indies fleet.

As the French fleet was preparing to depart Brest, France in March 1781, several important decisions were made. The West Indies fleet, led by the Rear-Admiral Comte François Joseph Paul de Grasse, after operations in the Windward Islands, was directed to go to Cap-Français (present-day Cap-Haïtien, Haiti) to determine what resources would be required to assist Spanish operations. Because of a lack of transports, France also promised six million livres to support the American war effort instead of providing additional troops. The French fleet at Newport was given a new commander, the Comte Jacques-Melchior de Barras Saint-Laurent. He was ordered to take the Newport fleet to harass British shipping off Nova Scotia and Newfoundland, and the French army at Newport was ordered to combine with Washington's army outside New York. In orders that were deliberately not fully shared with General Washington, De Grasse was instructed to assist in North American operations after his stop at Cap-Français. The French Lieutenant-General Comte Jean-Baptiste de Rochambeau, was instructed to tell Washington that de Grasse might be able to assist, without making any commitment (Washington learned from John Laurens, stationed in Paris, that de Grasse had discretion to come north).

=== Opening moves ===
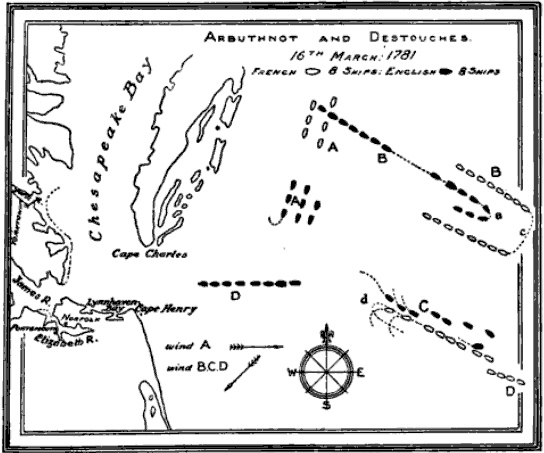
Tactical diagram of the Battle of Cape Henry: A: fleets sight each other B: first tack C: second tack D: disengagement

In December 1780, General Clinton sent Brigadier General Benedict Arnold (who had changed sides the previous September) with about 1,700 troops to Virginia to carry out raiding and to fortify Portsmouth. Washington responded by sending the Marquis de Lafayette south with a small army to oppose Arnold. Seeking to trap Arnold between Lafayette's army and a French naval detachment, Washington sought the Admiral Chevalier Destouches, the commander of the French fleet at Newport for help. Destouches was restrained by the larger British North American fleet anchored at Gardiner's Bay off the eastern end of Long Island, and was unable to help.

In early February, after receiving reports of British ships damaged by a storm, Destouches decided to send a naval expedition from his base in Newport. On 9 February, Captain Arnaud de Gardeur de Tilley sailed from Newport with three ships (ship of the line Eveille and frigates Surveillante and Gentile). When de Tilley arrived off Portsmouth four days later, Arnold retreated his ships, which had shallower drafts, up the Elizabeth River, where the larger French ships could not follow. Unable to attack Arnold's position, de Tilley could only return to Newport. On the way back, the French captured HMS Romulus, a 44-gun frigate sent to investigate their movements. This success and the pleas of General Washington, permitted Destouches to launch a full-scale operation. On 8 March, Washington was in Newport when Destouches sailed with his entire fleet, carrying 1,200 troops for use in land operations when they arrived in the Chesapeake.

Vice-Admiral Mariot Arbuthnot, the British fleet commander in North America, was aware that Destouches was planning something, but did not learn of Destouches' sailing until 10 March, and immediately led his fleet out of Gardiner Bay in pursuit. He had the advantage of favourable winds, and reached Cape Henry on 16 March, slightly ahead of Destouches. Although suffering a tactical defeat, Arbuthnot was able to pull into Chesapeake Bay, thus frustrating the original intent of Destouches' mission, forcing the French fleet to return to Newport. After transports delivered 2,000 men to reinforce Arnold, Arbuthnot returned to New York. He resigned his post as station chief in July and left for England, ending a stormy, difficult, and unproductive relationship with General Clinton.

=== Arrival of the fleets ===
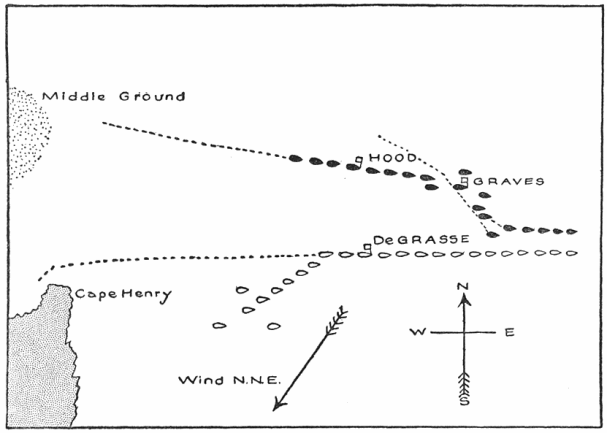
Diagram of the line of battles at the Chesapeake, 5 September 1781

The French fleet sailed from Brest on 22 March. The British fleet was busy with preparations to resupply Gibraltar, and did not attempt to oppose the departure. After the French fleet sailed, the packet ship Concorde sailed for Newport, carrying the comte de Barras, Rochambeau's orders, and credits for the six million livres. In a separate dispatch sent later, Admiral de Grasse also made two important requests. The first was that he be notified at Cap-Français of the situation in North America so that he could decide how he might be able to assist in operations there, and the second was that he be supplied with 30 pilots familiar with North American waters.

On 21 May Generals George Washington and the comte de Rochambeau, respectively the commanders of the American and French armies in North America, met to discuss potential operations against the British. They considered either an assault or siege on the principal British base at New York City, or operations against the British forces in Virginia. Since either of these options would require the assistance of the French fleet then in the West Indies, a ship was dispatched to meet with de Grasse who was expected at Cap-Français, outlining the possibilities and requesting his assistance. Rochambeau, in a private note to de Grasse, indicated that his preference was for an operation against Virginia. The two generals then moved their forces to White Plains, New York to study New York's defences and await news from de Grasse.

De Grasse arrived at Cap-Français on 15 August. He immediately dispatched his response, which was that he would make for the Chesapeake. Taking on 3,200 troops, he sailed from Cap-Français with his entire fleet, 28 ships of the line. Sailing outside the normal shipping lanes to avoid notice, he arrived at the mouth of Chesapeake Bay on 30 August and disembarked the troops to assist in the land blockade of Cornwallis. Two British frigates that were supposed to be on patrol outside the bay were trapped inside the bay by de Grasse's arrival; this prevented the British in New York from learning the full strength of de Grasse's fleet until it was too late.

British Vice-Admiral Sir George Brydges Rodney had been warned that de Grasse was planning to take at least part of his fleet north. Although he had some clues that he might take his whole fleet (he was aware of the number of pilots de Grasse had requested, for example), he assumed that de Grasse would not leave the French convoy at Cap-Français, and that part of his fleet would escort it to France. So Rodney accordingly divided his fleet, sending Rear-Admiral Sir Samuel Hood north with 15 ships of the line and orders to find de Grasse's destination in North America and report to New York. Rodney, who was ill, took the rest of the fleet back to Britain in order to recover, refit his fleet, and to avoid the Atlantic hurricane season. Hood sailed from Antigua on 10 August, five days after de Grasse. During the voyage, one of his ships became separated and was captured by a privateer.

Sailing more directly than de Grasse, Hood's fleet arrived off the entrance to the Chesapeake on 25 August. Finding no French ships there, he then sailed on to New York to meet with Rear-Admiral Sir Thomas Graves, in command of the North American station following Arbuthnot's departure, whom had spent several weeks trying to intercept a convoy organised by John Laurens to bring much-needed supplies and hard currency from France to Boston. When Hood arrived at New York, he found that Graves was in port (having failed to intercept the convoy), but had only five ships of the line that were ready for battle.

De Grasse had notified his counterpart in Newport, the comte de Barras Saint-Laurent, of his intentions and his planned arrival date. De Barras sailed from Newport on 27 August with 8 ships of the line, 4 frigates, and 18 transports carrying French armaments and siege equipment. He deliberately sailed via a circuitous route to minimise the possibility of an encounter with the British, should they sail from New York in pursuit. Washington and Rochambeau, in the meantime, had crossed the Hudson on 24 August, leaving some troops behind as a ruse to delay any potential move on the part of General Clinton to mobilise assistance for Cornwallis.

News of de Barras' departure led the British to realise that the Chesapeake was the probable target of the French fleets. By 31 August Graves had moved his ships over the bar at New York harbour. Taking command of the combined fleet, now 19 ships, Graves sailed south, and arrived at the mouth of the Chesapeake on 5 September. His progress was slow; the poor condition of some of the West Indies ships (contrary to claims by Admiral Hood that his fleet was fit for a month of service) necessitated repairs en route. Graves was also concerned about some ships in his own fleet; Europe in particular had difficulty manoeuvring. The squadrons' clash started with Marseillois exchanging shots with the 64-gun HMS Intrepid, under Captain Anthony Molloy.

== Aftermath ==
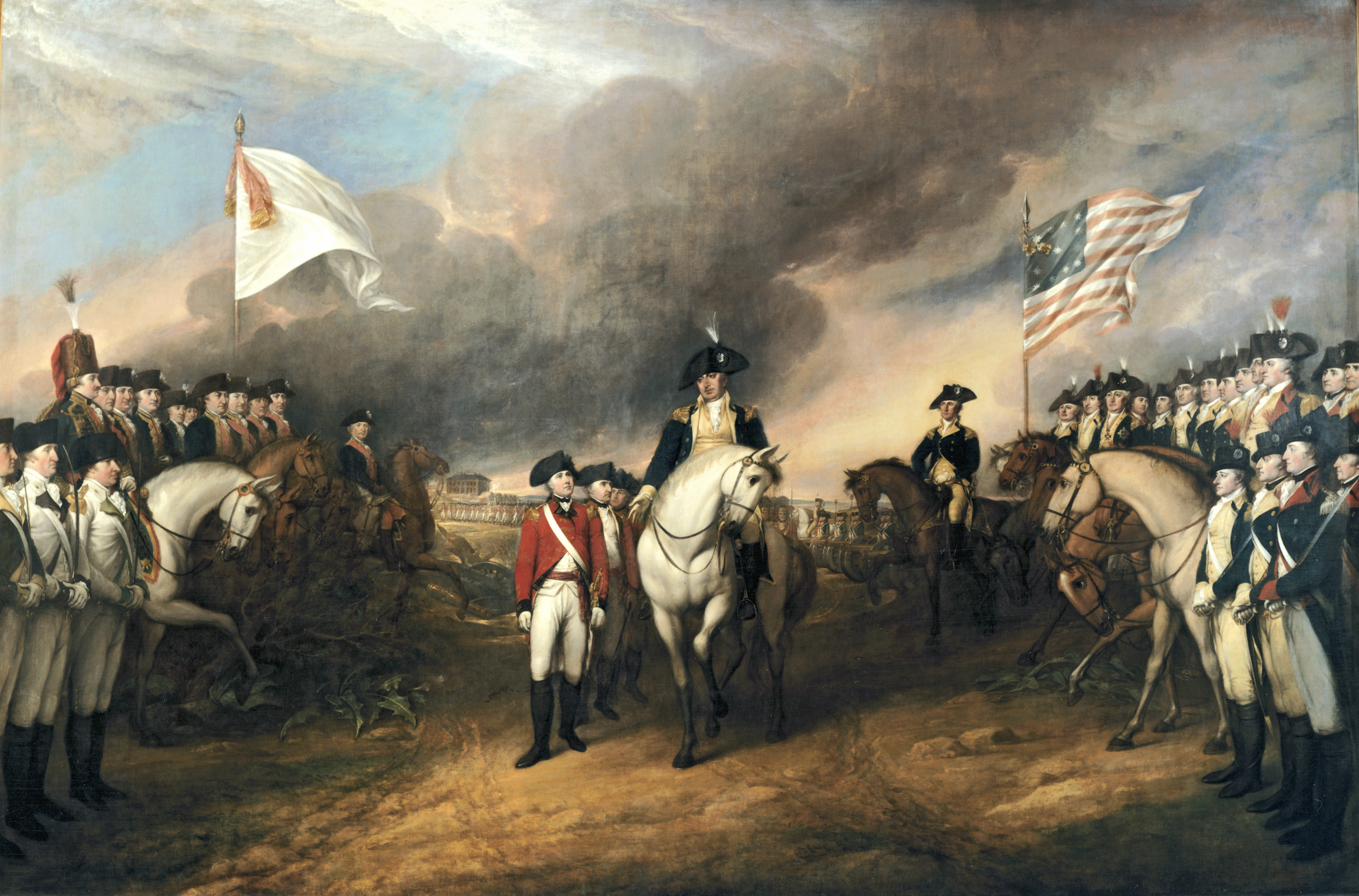
The surrender of Cornwallis' army at Yorktown on 19 October 1781

The British retreat in disarray set off a flurry of panic among the Loyalist population. The news of the defeat was also not received well in London. King George III wrote (well before learning of Cornwallis's surrender) that "after the knowledge of the defeat of our fleet [...] I nearly think the empire ruined". The French success at completely encircling Cornwallis left them firmly in control of Chesapeake Bay. In addition to capturing a number of smaller British vessels, de Grasse and de Barras assigned their smaller vessels to assist in the transport of Washington's and Rochambeau's forces from Head of Elk, Maryland to Yorktown.

It was not until 23 September that Graves and Clinton learned that the French fleet in the Chesapeake numbered 36 ships. This news came from a dispatch sneaked out by Cornwallis on the 17th, accompanied by a plea for help: "If you cannot relieve me very soon, you must be prepared to hear the worst". After effecting repairs in New York, Admiral Graves sailed from New York on 19 October with 25 ships of the line and transports carrying 7,000 troops to relieve Cornwallis. It was two days after Cornwallis surrendered at Yorktown. General Washington acknowledged to de Grasse the importance of his role in the victory: "You will have observed that, whatever efforts are made by the land armies, the navy must have the casting vote in the present contest". The eventual surrender of Cornwallis led to peace two years later and British recognition of the independent United States of America.

Admiral de Grasse returned with his fleet to the West Indies. In a major engagement that suspended Franco-Spanish plans for the capture of Jamaica in 1782, he was defeated and taken prisoner by Rodney in the Battle of the Saintes. His flagship Ville de Paris was lost at sea in a storm while being conducted back to England as part of a fleet commanded by Admiral Graves. Despite the controversy over his conduct in this battle, Graves continued to serve, rising to full admiral and receiving an Irish peerage.

== See also ==
- Quasi War
- War of 1812

== Notes ==
=== Bibliography ===
- Beatson, Robert (1972) [1804]. Naval and Military Memoirs of Great Britain, from 1727 to 1783. Vol. 4. London: Longman, Hurst, Rees & Orme. ISBN 978-0-8398-0189-4. OCLC 669129181.
- Benedetto, William R. (2006). Sailing Into the Abyss: A True Story of Extreme Heroism on the High Seas. New York: Citadel Press. ISBN 978-0-8065-2646-1. OCLC 70683882.
- Brooks, Victor (1999). The Boston Campaign. Combined Publishing. ISBN 1-58097-007-9. OCLC 833471799.
- Callo, Joseph F (2006). John Paul Jones: America's First Sea Warrior. Annapolis: Naval Institute Press. ISBN 978-1-59114-102-0. OCLC 62281463.
- Campbell, Charles (1860). History of the Colony and Ancient Dominion of Virginia. Philadelphia: J. B. Lippincott. OCLC 2109795.
- Carrington, Henry Beebe (1876). Battles of the American Revolution, 1775–1781. New York: A. S. Barnes. OCLC 33205321.
- Caulkins, Frances Manwaring; Griswold, Cecelia (1895). History of New London, Connecticut: From the First Survey of the Coast in 1612 to 1860. New London, Connecticut: H. D. Utley. OCLC 1856358.
- Chamberlain, Mellen, ed. (1908). A Documentary History of Chelsea: Including the Boston Precincts of Winnisimmet, Rumney Marsh, and Pullen Point 1624–1824. Vol. 2. Boston: Massachusetts Historical Society. OCLC 1172330.
- Charles, Patrick J (2008). Irreconcilable Grievances: The Events That Shaped American Independence. Westminster, Maryland: Heritage Books. ISBN 978-0-7884-4566-8. OCLC 212838026.
- Coleman, Kenneth (1991). A History of Georgia. Athens, GA: University of Georgia Press. ISBN 978-0-8203-1269-9. OCLC 21975722.
- Colomb, Philip (1895). Naval Warfare, its Ruling Principles and Practice Historically Treated. London: W. H. Allen. OCLC 2863262.
- Daughan, George (2011) [2008]. If By Sea: The Forging of the American Navy—from the Revolution to the War of 1812. Basic Books. ISBN 978-0-465-02514-5. OCLC 701015376.
- Davis, Burke (1970). The Campaign That Won America: the Story of Yorktown. New York: Dial Press. OCLC 248958859.
- Dearden, Paul F. (1980). The Rhode Island Campaign of 1778. Providence, RI: Rhode Island Bicentennial Federation. ISBN 978-0-917012-17-4. OCLC 60041024.
- Douglas, W. A. B. (1979). "BYRON, JOHN". Dictionary of Canadian Biography. Vol. 4. University of Toronto/Université Laval.
- Drisko, George Washington (1904). Narrative of the Town of Machias, the Old and the New, the Early and Late. Press of the Republican. OCLC 6479739.
- Dull, Jonathan R (1975). The French Navy and American Independence: A Study of Arms and Diplomacy, 1774–1787. Princeton, NJ: Princeton University Press. ISBN 978-0-691-06920-3. OCLC 1500030.
- Duncan, Roger F. (1992). Coastal Maine: A Maritime History. New York: Norton. ISBN 0-393-03048-2. OCLC 24142698.
- Ferling, John E (2010). The Ascent of George Washington: The Hidden Political Genius of an American Icon. New York: Bloomsbury Press. ISBN 978-1-60819-095-9. OCLC 462908150.
- Field, Edward (1898). Esek Hopkins, Commander-in-Chief of the Continental Navy During the American Revolution, 1775 to 1778. Providence: Preston & Rounds. OCLC 3430958.
- French, Allen (1911). The Siege of Boston. Macmillan. OCLC 3927532.
- Grainger, John D. (2005). The Battle of Yorktown, 1781: A Reassessment. Woodbridge: The Boydell Press. ISBN 978-1-84383-137-2. OCLC 57311901.
- Gruber, Ira (1972). The Howe Brothers and the American Revolution. New York: Atheneum Press. ISBN 978-0-8078-1229-7. OCLC 1464455.
- Howarth, Stephen (1999). To Shining Sea: a History of the United States Navy, 1775–1998. Norman, OK: University of Oklahoma Press. ISBN 0-8061-3026-1. OCLC 40200083.
- Ketchum, Richard M (1999). Decisive Day: The Battle for Bunker Hill. New York: Henry Holt and Company. ISBN 978-0-8050-6099-7. OCLC 40644809.
- Ketchum, Richard M (2004). Victory at Yorktown: the Campaign That Won the Revolution. New York: Henry Holt and Company. ISBN 978-0-8050-7396-6. OCLC 54461977.
- Larrabee, Harold A (1964). Decision at the Chesapeake. New York: Clarkson N. Potter. OCLC 426234.
- Leamon, James S (1995). Revolution Downeast: The War for American Independence in Maine. Amherst: University of Massachusetts Press. ISBN 978-0-87023-959-5.
- Leckie, Robert (1993). George Washington's War: The Saga of the American Revolution. New York: HarperCollins. ISBN 978-0-06-092215-3. OCLC 29748139.
- Linder, Bruce (2005). Tidewater's Navy: an Illustrated History. Annapolis: Naval Institute Press. ISBN 978-1-59114-465-6. OCLC 60931416.
- Lockhart, Paul (2008). The Drillmaster of Valley Forge: The Baron de Steuben and the Making of the American Army. New York: Smithsonian Books (HarperCollins). ISBN 978-0-06-145163-8. OCLC 191930840.
- Mahan, Alfred Thayer (1890). the Influence of sea power upon history, 1660–1783. Boston: Little, Brown and Company. OCLC 8673260.
- Mahan, Alfred Thayer (1898). Major Operations of the Royal Navy, 1762–1783. Boston: Little, Brown and Company. OCLC 3012050.
- McCullough, David (2005). 1776. New York: Simon & Schuster. ISBN 0-7432-2672-0. OCLC 57557578.
- Miller, Nathan (1974). Sea of Glory: The Continental Navy Fights for Independence, 1775–1783. New York: David McKay Company. ISBN 978-0-679-50392-7. OCLC 844299.
- Miller, Nathan (1997). The U.S. Navy: A History (3rd ed.). Annapolis: Naval Institute Press. ISBN 1-55750-595-0. OCLC 37211290.
- Morgan, William James (1959). Captains to the Northward. Barre, MA: Barre Publishing. OCLC 1558276.
- Morison, Samuel Eliot (1999) [1959]. John Paul Jones: A Sailor's Biography. Annapolis: Naval Institute Press. ISBN 978-1-55750-410-4. OCLC 42716061.
- Morrill, Dan (1993). Southern Campaigns of the American Revolution. Baltimore: The Nautical & Aviation Publishing Company of America. ISBN 1-877853-21-6. OCLC 29357639.
- Morrissey, Brendan (1995). Boston 1775: The Shot Heard Around the World. London: Osprey Publishing. ISBN 978-1-85532-362-9. OCLC 33042763.
- Morrissey, Brendan (1997). Yorktown 1781: the World Turned Upside Down. London: Osprey Publishing. ISBN 978-1-85532-688-0. OCLC 39028166.
- Nelson, Paul David (1985). Anthony Wayne, Soldier of the Early Republic. Bloomington, IN: Indiana University Press. ISBN 978-0-253-30751-4. OCLC 11518827.
- Nelson, James L. (2008). George Washington's Secret Navy: How the American Revolution Went to Sea. New York: McGraw-Hill Professional. ISBN 978-0-07-149389-5. OCLC 212627064.
- Nelson, Paul David (1996). Sir Charles Grey, First Earl Grey: Royal Soldier, Family Patriarch. Madison, NJ: Fairleigh Dickinson University Press. ISBN 978-0-8386-3673-2. OCLC 33820307.
- Perkins, James Breck (1911). France in the American Revolution. Boston: Houghton Mifflin. OCLC 177577.
- Russell, David Lee (2000). The American Revolution in the Southern Colonies. Jefferson, NC: McFarland. ISBN 978-0-7864-0783-5. OCLC 44562323.
- Schaeper, Thomas (2011). Edward Bancroft: Scientist, Author, Spy. New Haven, CT: Yale University Press. ISBN 978-0-300-11842-1. OCLC 178289618.
- Sweetman, Jack (2002). American Naval History: An Illustrated Chronology of the U.S. Navy and Marine Corps, 1775–present. Annapolis: Naval Institute Press. ISBN 1-55750-867-4. OCLC 48046120.
- Thomas, Evan (2004). John Paul Jones: Sailor, Hero, Father of the American Navy. New York: Simon and Schuster. ISBN 978-0-7432-5804-3. OCLC 56321227.
- Troude, Onésime-Joachim (1867). Batailles navales de la France (in French). Vol. 2. Challamel ainé. OCLC 18683121.
- Volo, James M (2008). Blue Water Patriots: The American Revolution Afloat. Lanham: Rowman & Littlefield. ISBN 978-0-7425-6120-5. OCLC 209652239.
- Ward, Christopher (1952). War of the Revolution. New York: Macmillan. OCLC 214962727.
