= Chelsea Street Bridge (Boston) =

Bridge in Massachusetts, United States

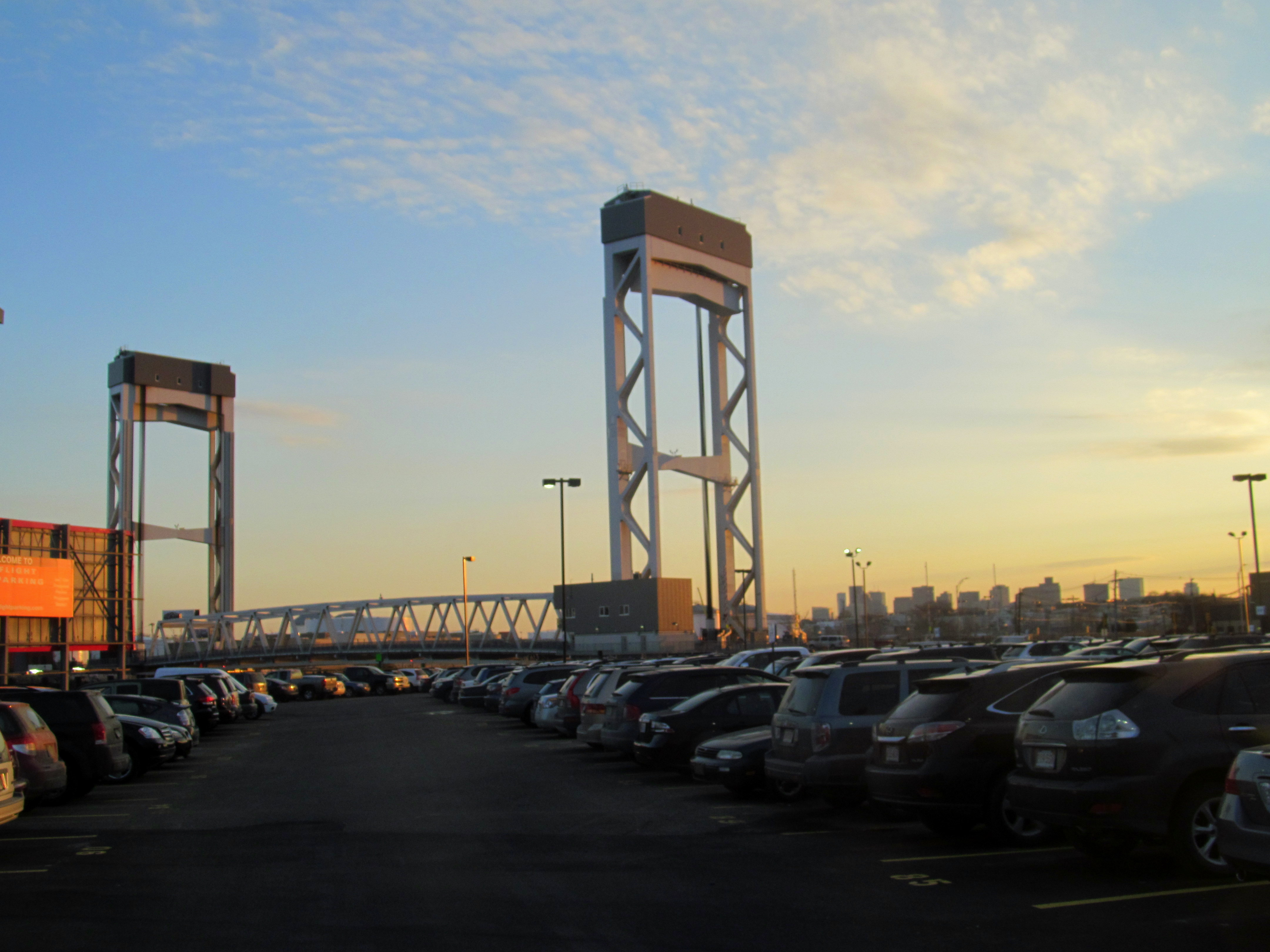
- Chelsea Street Bridge in March 2014
- Coordinates: 42.3863°N 71.0227°W
- Crosses: Chelsea River
- Followed by: Andrew McArdle Bridge

Characteristics
- Design: Vertical-lift bridge
- Total length: 450 feet (140 m)
- Clearance above: 175 feet (53 m) (raised)

History
- Construction start: October 28, 2008
- Construction end: Summer 2013
- Construction cost: $125,491,530.96
- Opened: May 12, 2012

Location
- Interactive map of Chelsea Street Bridge

The Chelsea Street Bridge is a vertical-lift bridge that carries Chelsea Street between East Boston and Chelsea, Massachusetts, United States, over the Chelsea Creek. It opened to traffic on May 12, 2012, after a $125.3M construction project replaced the previous bridge, a single-leaf bascule-type drawbridge. The span is 450 feet (140 m) with a vertical clearance, when opened, of 175 feet (53 m). There are two lanes and a sidewalk in each direction.

== Previous bridges ==
The current bridge is the latest in a succession of bridges at the same site going back to 1834. The most recent predecessor was a single-leaf bascule bridge on which construction began in 1936 and which was opened on May 10, 1937.

== Silver Line issues ==
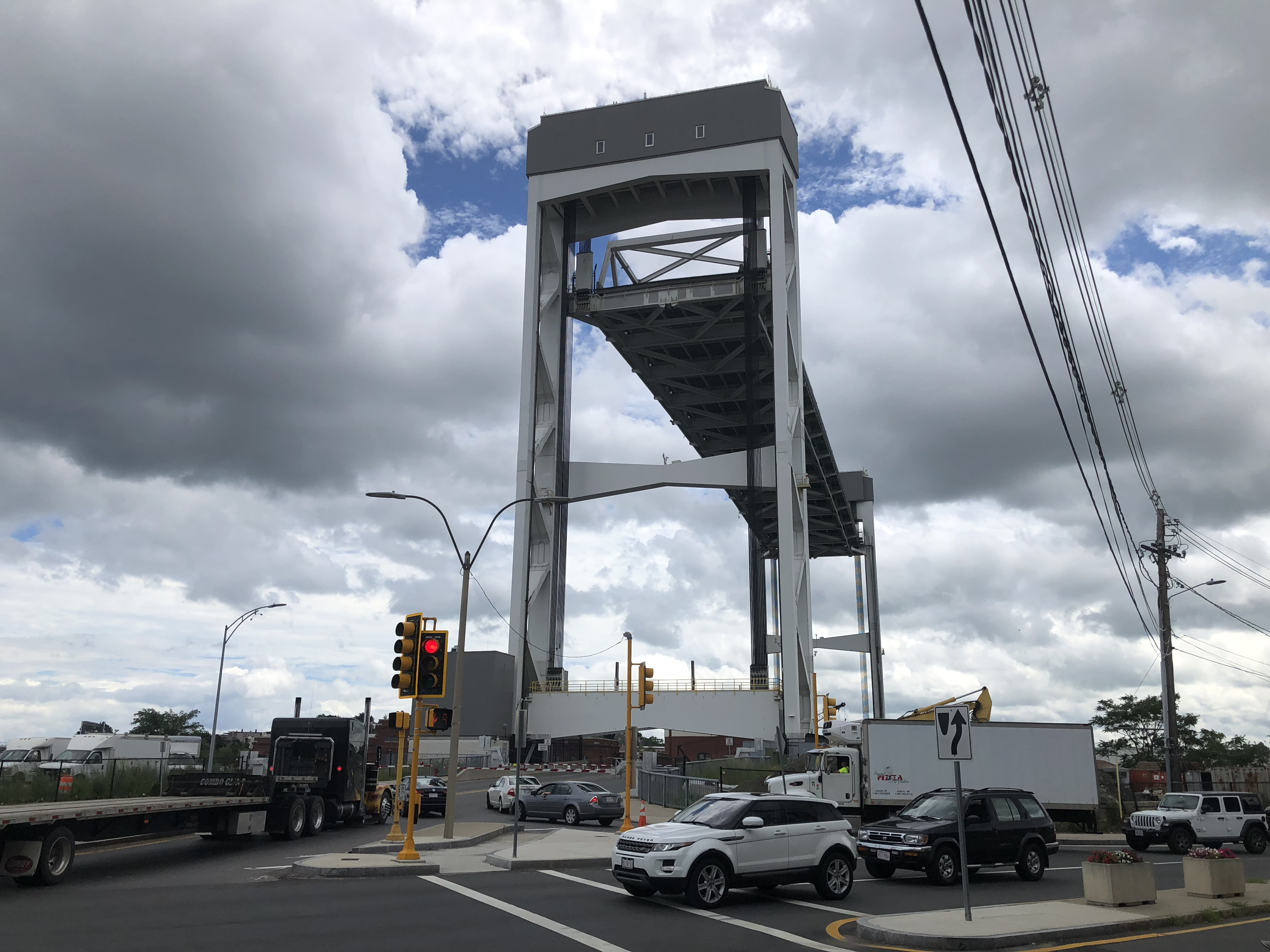
Chelsea Street Bridge in the raised position

The Chelsea Street Bridge is used by the MBTA Silver Line SL3 route, which began service in April 2018. Frequent openings of the bridge — as many as ten per day — have caused numerous delays. Ships and barges carry petroleum products to tank farms upstream from the bridge and each delivery can cause at least two bridge openings as tug boats come and go. Federal regulations give priority to marine traffic and require the bridge to be opened on demand.

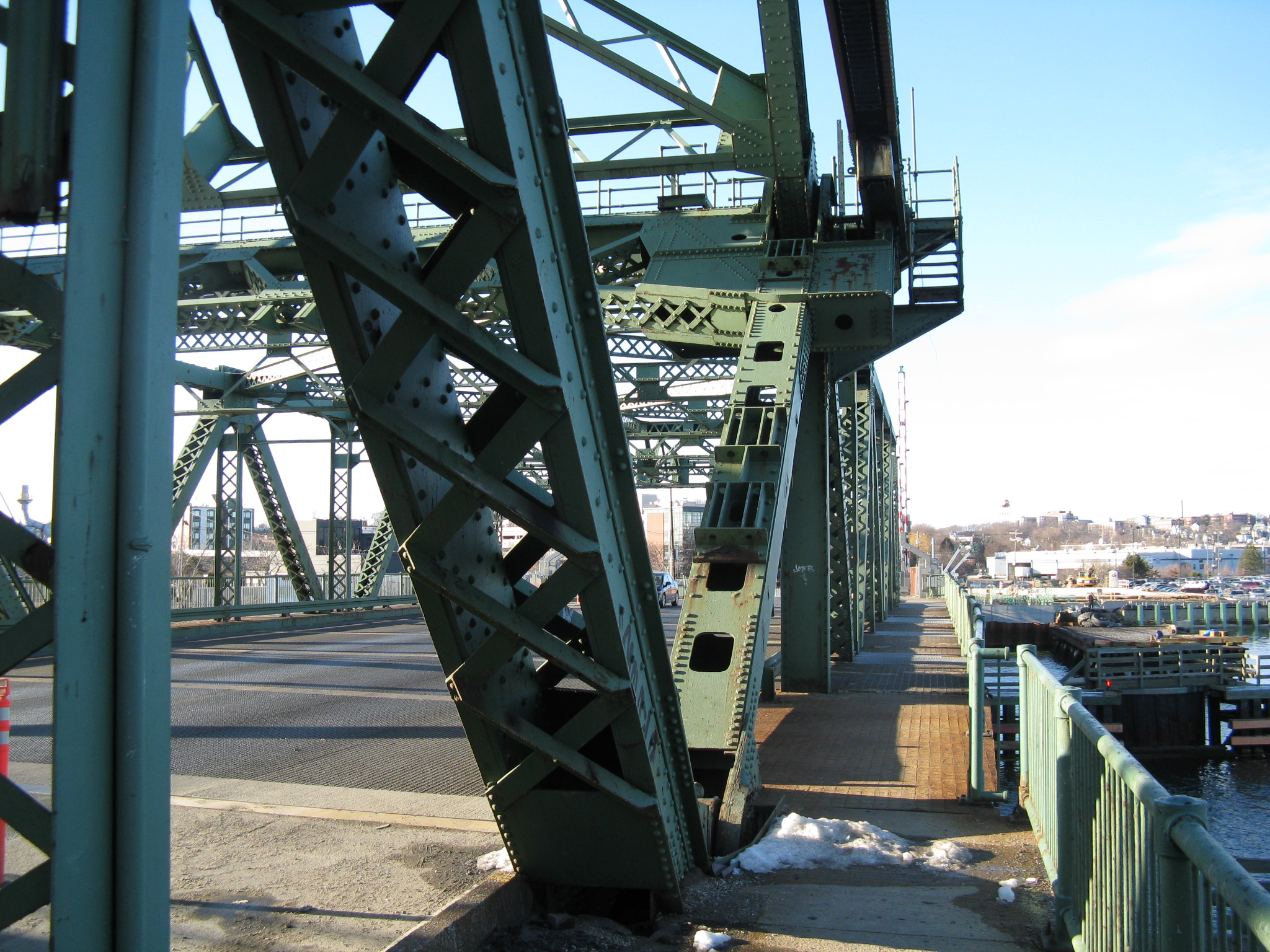
Previous bridge

== See also ==
- List of bridges documented by the Historic American Engineering Record in Massachusetts
