= Andrew P. McArdle Memorial Bridge =

Andrew McArdle Bridge
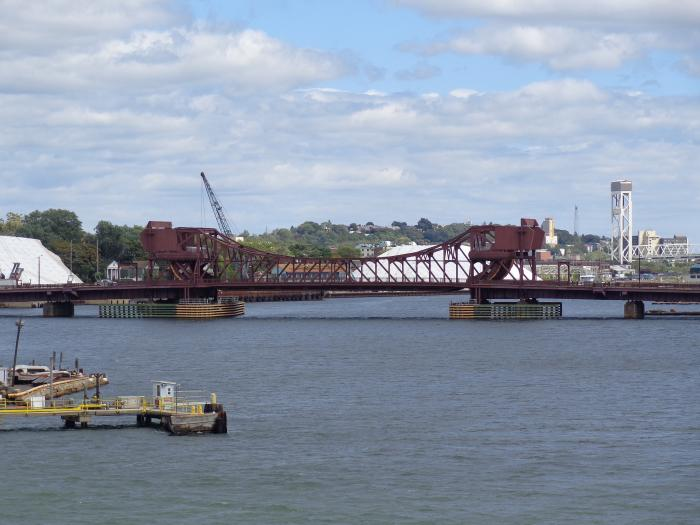
- Andrew McArdle Bridge, from Wikimapia
- Coordinates: 42.3858516°N 71.0392682°W
- Carries: Meridian Street in East Boston, Pearl Street in Chelsea
- Crosses: Chelsea Creek
- Locale: East Boston and Chelsea, Massachusetts
- Official name: Andrew P. McArdle Memorial Bridge
- Other name(s): Meridian Street Bridge
- Named for: Andrew P. McArdle (1896-1950)
- Owner: MassDOT
- Preceded by: Chelsea Street Bridge
- Followed by: Boston Harbor

Characteristics
- Design: Bascule bridge
- Total length: 1,075 feet (328 m)
- Width: 44 feet (13 m)
- Longest span: 225 feet (69 m)
- Clearance above: 21 feet (6.4 m) (closed), 157 feet (48 m) (open)

History
- Opened: 1954
- Replaces: Meridian Street Swing Bridge (1901)

Statistics
- Daily traffic: 23,600, 4% truck (2014)
- Toll: none

References
- http://bridgereports.com/1234922

The Andrew P. McArdle Memorial Bridge is a steel truss bascule bridge over the Chelsea Creek, just upstream of its confluence with the Mystic River and the Tobin Bridge. Also known as the Meridian Street Bridge, it connects Meridian Street in East Boston with Pearl Street in Chelsea, Massachusetts. The bridge is a split rolling bascule, meaning that instead of pivoting on axles, the two counterweighted spans are raised by rolling on large semi-circular gears.

The bridge was refurbished in 2002. According to the U.S. Federal Highway Administration 2017 National Bridge Inventory, the bridge structure's condition is poor and is "[b]asically intolerable requiring high priority of replacement."

== Fatal accident ==
On New Year's Eve, 2013, an East Boston resident, Aura Garcia, was killed when the bridge operator accidentally opened the bridge while Garcia was crossing it. A lawsuit against the city of Boston was brought; in response to a motion to dismiss, Judge F. Dennis Saylor IV determined that Garcia's death was "in all likelihood preventable" but did not meet the standard of the particular statutes cited, and thus granted the motion and dismissed the case.
