= HMS Somerset (1748) =

Ship of the line of the Royal Navy

Coordinates: 42.039°N 70.061°W

- Ship plan of Somerset

History

Great Britain
- Name: HMS Somerset
- Ordered: 4 September 1746
- Builder: Chatham Dockyard
- Launched: 18 July 1748
- Fate: Wrecked, 2 November 1778

General characteristics
- Class & type: 1745 Establishment 70-gun third rate ship of the line
- Tons burthen: 1436 bm
- Length: 160 ft (48.8 m) (gundeck)
- Beam: 45 ft (13.7 m)
- Depth of hold: 19 ft 4 in (5.9 m)
- Propulsion: Sails
- Sail plan: Full-rigged ship
- Armament: 70 guns: Gundeck: 26 × 32 pdrs; Upper gundeck: 28 × 18 pdrs; Quarterdeck: 12 × 9 pdrs; Forecastle: 4 × 9 pdrs

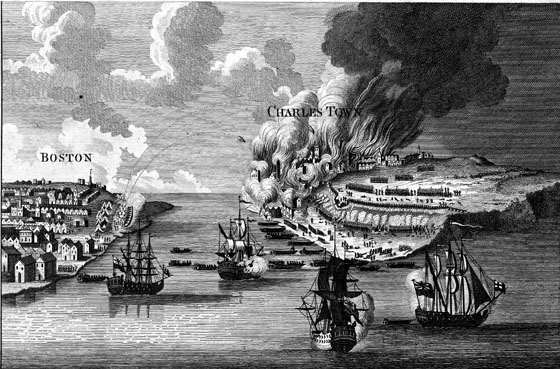
Somerset participates in the Battle of Bunker Hill

HMS Somerset was a 70-gun third-rate ship of the line of the Royal Navy, built at Chatham Dockyard to the draught specified by the 1745 Establishment, and launched on 18 July 1748. She was the third vessel of the Royal Navy to bear the name. Somerset was involved in several notable battles of the Seven Years' War and the American Revolutionary War. She was wrecked in a storm in 1778 when she ran aground off of Provincetown, on Cape Cod, Massachusetts.

== Seven Years' War ==
HMS Somerset saw action at the capture of the fortress of Louisbourg and Cape Breton Island during the Seven Years' War (a theatre known in the United States as the French and Indian War). In 1758, a British expedition under General Jeffery Amherst besieged the fortress at Louisbourg, beginning on 8 June. The British had 39 ships with about 14,000 sailors, and a further landing force of 12,870 soldiers. The fortress was defended by 10 French ships with 3,870 sailors, and another 3,920 soldiers inside the fortress itself. The 48-day siege by Admiral Edward Boscawen and General Amherst ended with the French surrender on 26 July, clearing the way for a British expedition to sail up the Saint Lawrence River to take Quebec City the following summer.

The expedition against Quebec City, led by General James Wolfe, was landed by a force that included HMS Somerset. The British were victorious at the Battle of the Plains of Abraham on 13 September 1759 giving Britain control of Canada and North America's Atlantic seaboard.

== American Revolutionary War ==
HMS Somerset went on to play a well documented part in the American Revolutionary War, where she served from 1774 to 1776 and again from 1777 up until her loss in 1778.

=== Battle of Lexington and Concord ===
Events might have unfolded differently on the night of 18 April 1775 had the duty watch of HMS Somerset been more alert. Colonel Paul Revere had set out that night to ride to Lexington to warn two prominent Colonial leaders, Samuel Adams and John Hancock, that their lives might be in danger. Having departed Boston by rowboat to cross the Back Bay into Charlestown, he narrowly avoided being noticed by HMS Somerset, which was anchored there. Had he been stopped, the militias of many towns would not have arrived in Concord, and the next day's battle of Lexington and Concord might have had a different outcome. As it was, Somerset's gun crews were able to keep rebel forces from following the retreating British troops to Charlestown on the evening of 19 April.

Revere's exploits led to HMS Somerset’s immortalisation in Henry Wadsworth Longfellow's poem 'The Midnight Ride of Paul Revere':

Then he said 'Good-night!' and with muffled oar
Silently rowed to the Charlestown shore,
Just as the moon rose over the bay,
Where swinging wide at her moorings lay
The Somerset, British man-of-war;
A phantom ship, with each mast and spar
Across the moon like a prison bar,
And a huge black hulk, that was magnified
By its own reflection in the tide.

=== Battle of Chelsea Creek ===
Somerset was the backdrop to another brief but important incident during the war, the Battle of Chelsea Creek. On the night of Saturday 27 May 1775, HMS Armed Schooner Diana, under the command of Lieutenant Thomas Graves, ran aground in Chelsea Creek while attempting to keep Americans from driving British livestock from Noddle's Island in Boston Harbor, at which point the American rebels set fire to the ship. HMS Somerset's tender, Britannia (under the command of Thomas Graves' brother Lieutenant John Graves), was able to rescue the Diana's company.

Lt Thomas Graves went on to serve under Lord Rodney at the Battle of the Saintes, eventually becoming Rear Admiral Sir Thomas Graves and Nelson's second-in-command at the Battle of Copenhagen. He was permanently scarred by the burns he received at Noddle's Island. He was a cousin of Admiral Thomas Graves, 1st Baron Graves who would command at the Battle of the Chesapeake in 1781, and the nephew of Admiral Samuel Graves.

=== Battle of Bunker Hill (Breed's Hill) ===
Shortly after those events, HMS Somerset served as the flagship of Admiral Samuel Graves at the Battle of Bunker Hill. Boston, under British control since 1768, was under siege by between 8,000 and 12,000 militia. On the night of 16 June 1775, several thousand militia forces began occupying the strategically important Charlestown Peninsula and fortified Breed's Hill, a position from which they would be able to bombard the British in Boston. At dawn, HMS Lively was first to spot the new fortification and the ship opened fire, temporarily halting the Americans' work. Admiral Graves, in HMS Somerset, awoke to the sound of gunfire he hadn't ordered. He ordered it stopped, only to reverse his order when he saw the works. He ordered all 128 guns in the harbour to open fire on the American position. The broadsides proved largely ineffective, since the ships were unable to elevate their guns sufficiently to reach the hilltop. The position was eventually taken by British troops, ferried across the bay under protection of the navy's guns, but at considerable cost in the Battle of Bunker Hill.

In January 1776, the ship sailed for England via Nova Scotia, arriving back in England in February 1776. During the voyage, Cuthbert Collingwood served as a lieutenant on board.

== Loss ==
In the autumn of 1777, HMS Somerset took part in the siege of Fort Mifflin in which the British successfully captured the river forts on the Delaware River. HMS Somerset’s luck ran out at the end of 1778. She was battered by gales in August. While pursuing a French squadron, she ran aground in a 2 November 1778 gale on Peaked Hill Bars off Provincetown, Massachusetts. By the time Somerset was wrecked, the economy of Cape Cod had been brought to a standstill by the British blockade of Boston which began in 1774. Commercial fishing and whaling were virtually shut down, and some locals had engaged in privateering and smuggling along the coast, while others turned to the land for subsistence. When Somerset wrecked on the Cape, there likely was a strong emotional reaction by the local populace. According to the official account of the ship's captain, George Ourry, only 21 men were lost during the wreck.

Ourry was forced to walk under guard to Providence, Rhode Island, where he was exchanged for two American officers. The rest of the crew, numbering over 400 men, were escorted to Boston. Towns along the route provided militia to escort and support the prisoners. A tremendous amount of scarce war material was chopped or pried away from the wreck by local residents before the state put a guard over what remained. Eleven 18-pound and five 9-pound cannon and powder were entrusted to Colonel Revere to be used in fortifying Castle Island in Boston Harbor. Salvage of Somerset's cargo was dangerous and difficult. Provisions in the lower hold were only accessible for a few hours a day at low tide. Severe winter storms in December finally broke apart the remains of the ship, moved it closer to shore, and eventually buried it under tons of sand at an area known locally as Dead Man's Hollow. It took several more months of bitter court proceedings to sort out who owned what in the aftermath of salvage operations.

Somerset's wreckage has been partially exposed, albeit briefly, only three times since 1788 – in 1886, 1973 and 2010 – by storm currents that caused part of the wreckage to be uncovered. In 2010 the National Park Service commissioned a digital survey using 3D imaging technology to accurately record the exposed timbers that were visible. It was estimated that only the lower ten percent of the ship remains, buried once again under the sand. Somerset is protected under international law, and is the sovereign property of the United Kingdom.

== Remembrance ==
The National Park Service preserves some of the large timbers from the wreck. In 2005, the park superintendent presented a few pieces of the Somerset to the commander and crew of the British navy's modern HMS Somerset (IV). HMS Somerset is remembered by a historical re-enactment society in Boston, called 'His Majesty's Ship Somerset'.
