= HMS Diana (1775) =

History

Great Britain
- Name: HMS Diana
- Launched: 1774
- Acquired: January 1775
- Fate: Run aground and burnt during the Battle of Chelsea Creek on 28 May 1775

General characteristics
- Type: Schooner
- Tons burthen: 120 (bm)
- Armament: 4 × 6-pounder guns + 12 × swivel guns

HMS Diana was the first British vessel that colonial forces captured and destroyed during the American Revolutionary War.

== History ==
The 120-ton schooner was afloat for little more than a year. She was built in 1774 in the Province of Massachusetts Bay and served as an unarmed private fishing boat for eight months before Vice-Admiral Samuel Graves purchased her for the Royal Navy in January 1775 for £750. According to Graves, the Diana was "so exceedingly well built that she is allowed to be the best Vessel of the Kind that has been yet in the King’s Service." Diana was refitted and armed with four 6-pounders and twelve swivel guns from HMS St. Lawrence to help enforce the Boston Port Act. She was placed under the command of Vice-Admiral Graves's nephew, Lieutenant Thomas Graves. Open warfare between the combatants began with the Battle of Lexington and Concord on 19 April 1775. During the siege of Boston that immediately followed, the new American Patriot army surrounded Boston with troops, but British forces had naval supremacy over all the waterways nearby and occupied Boston itself.

On 27 May 1775 Diana experienced unfavourable winds while exchanging fire with colonial land forces under John Stark during the Battle of Chelsea Creek. Rowboats began to tow her to safety, but the rowers were forced to leave their task under heavy fire. Diana drifted and ran aground on the Chelsea shore. General Israel Putnam then arrived with Patriot reinforcements and two cannon. Putnam offered "good quarter" to the sailors of Diana if they would surrender, but this offer was not accepted. The schooner rolled onto her side due to the lowering tide, but the crew continued to fire cannon when they were unable to stand on her deck. The British escaped Diana soon after midnight on 28 May, fleeing to the sloop Britannia, tender of HMS Somerset. The Britannia, under the command of Thomas Graves's brother John Graves, was able to escape the shallow water and return to safety. American forces boarded Diana and removed the weapons and all other items of value before destroying the vessel by burning her. Diana's 76' mast was one of the items removed from the ship before it was burned. On 1 August 1775, Diana's captured mast was erected as a liberty pole on Prospect Hill, a fortified high-ground overlooking the pathways to Charlestown, Boston.

== Post-script ==
While occasional attempts have been made to locate the remains of the Diana in Chelsea Creek, which has been extensively dredged and industrialized in the years since the battle, no wrecks found in that body have been identified as hers. In 2009, the National Park Service gave funds for a state-led effort to locate the wreck.

== See also ==
- Gaspée Affair
