= Battle of Chelsea Creek =

Battle of the American Revolutionary War

- Part of the American Revolutionary War and the Boston Campaign
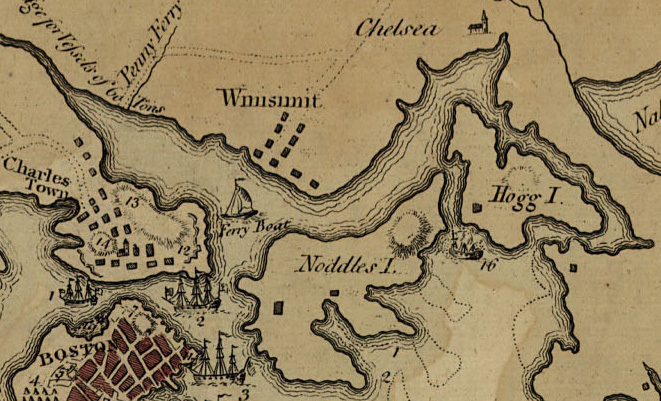
- Map of the battle location. Chelsea Creek separated the islands from Chelsea on the mainland to the north. The schooner Diana is represented by the burning vessel labeled "16". It was in Chelsea Creek during the battle and was never at the location indicated. It burned north of the boat labeled "Ferry Boat."
Date	May 27–28, 1775
Location	Suffolk County, Massachusetts 42°22′54.77″N 71°1′55.27″W
Result	American victory

Belligerents
United Colonies; Massachusetts Bay	Great Britain

Commanders and leaders
John Stark; Israel Putnam	Samuel Graves; Thomas Graves

Strength
300–600 in initial force to Hog Island (Stark). 300 additional reinforcements during the course of the battle (Putnam). These are rough estimates.	850 Royal Marines (Samuel Graves). 30 on the Diana (Thomas Graves). These are rough estimates.

Casualties and losses
4 wounded	2 killed; 32 wounded, Armed schooner Diana destroyed

The Battle of Chelsea Creek was the second military engagement of the Boston campaign of the American Revolutionary War. It is also known as the Battle of Noddle's Island, Battle of Hog Island and the Battle of the Chelsea Estuary. This battle was fought on May 27 and 28, 1775, on Chelsea Creek and on salt marshes, mudflats, and islands of Boston Harbor, northeast of the Boston peninsula. Most of these areas have since been united with the mainland by land reclamation and are now part of East Boston, Chelsea, Winthrop, and Revere.

The American colonists met their goal of strengthening the siege of Boston by removing livestock and hay on those islands from the reach of the British regulars. The British armed schooner Diana was also destroyed and its weaponry was appropriated by the Colonial side. This was the first naval capture of the war, and it was a significant boost to the morale of the Colonial forces.

== Background ==
The Battles of Lexington and Concord on April 19, 1775, drew thousands of militia forces from throughout New England to the towns surrounding Boston. These men remained in the area and their numbers grew, placing the British forces in Boston under siege when they blocked all land access to the peninsula. The British were still able to sail in supplies from Nova Scotia, Providence, and other places because the harbor side of the city remained under British naval control. Colonial forces could do little to stop these shipments due to the naval supremacy of the British fleet and the complete absence of a Continental Navy in the spring of 1775. However, the supplies brought in to feed British troops were of very low quality as they needed to be heavily preserved, and the loss of fresh meat and vegetables from the mainland sapped British morale.

Farmers to the east of the city in coastal areas and on the Boston Harbor islands found themselves vulnerable once the siege began because they were exposed to British influence from the sea. If they continued to sell livestock to the regulars they would be viewed as Loyalists in the eyes of the Patriots, but if they refused to sell then the British would consider them rebels and raiding parties would simply take what they wanted. On May 14, the Massachusetts Committee of Safety under Joseph Warren issued the following order:

Resolved, as their opinion, that all the live stock be taken from Noddle's Island, Hog Island, Snake Island, and from that part of Chelsea near the sea coast, and be driven back; and that the execution of this business be committed to the committees of correspondence and selectmen of the towns of Medford, Malden, Chelsea, and Lynn, and that they be supplied with such a number of men, as they shall need, from the regiment now at Medford.

A few days before the battle, Warren and General Artemas Ward, commander of the besieging forces, inspected Noddle's Island and Hog Island, which lay to the northeast of Boston, and east of Charlestown. They found no British troops there, but did spot countless livestock and fields abandoned by farmers who had chosen to flee inland. On May 21, the British had sailed troops to Grape Island in the outer harbor near Weymouth to get hay and livestock; the operation was foiled by an unexpected shift in the tides, allowing local militia to intercept and drive off the British before burning the hay and seizing the livestock.

The British Navy around occupied Boston was under the command of Vice-Admiral Samuel Graves. The Royal Marines were under the command of Major John Pitcairn. The British forces as a whole were led by Governor-General Thomas Gage. Graves had, in addition to hay and livestock, hired storage on Noddle's Island for a variety of important naval supplies which he felt were too valuable to keep in Patriot-leaning Boston, owing to the "almost impossibility of replacing them at this Juncture."

== Prelude to battle ==
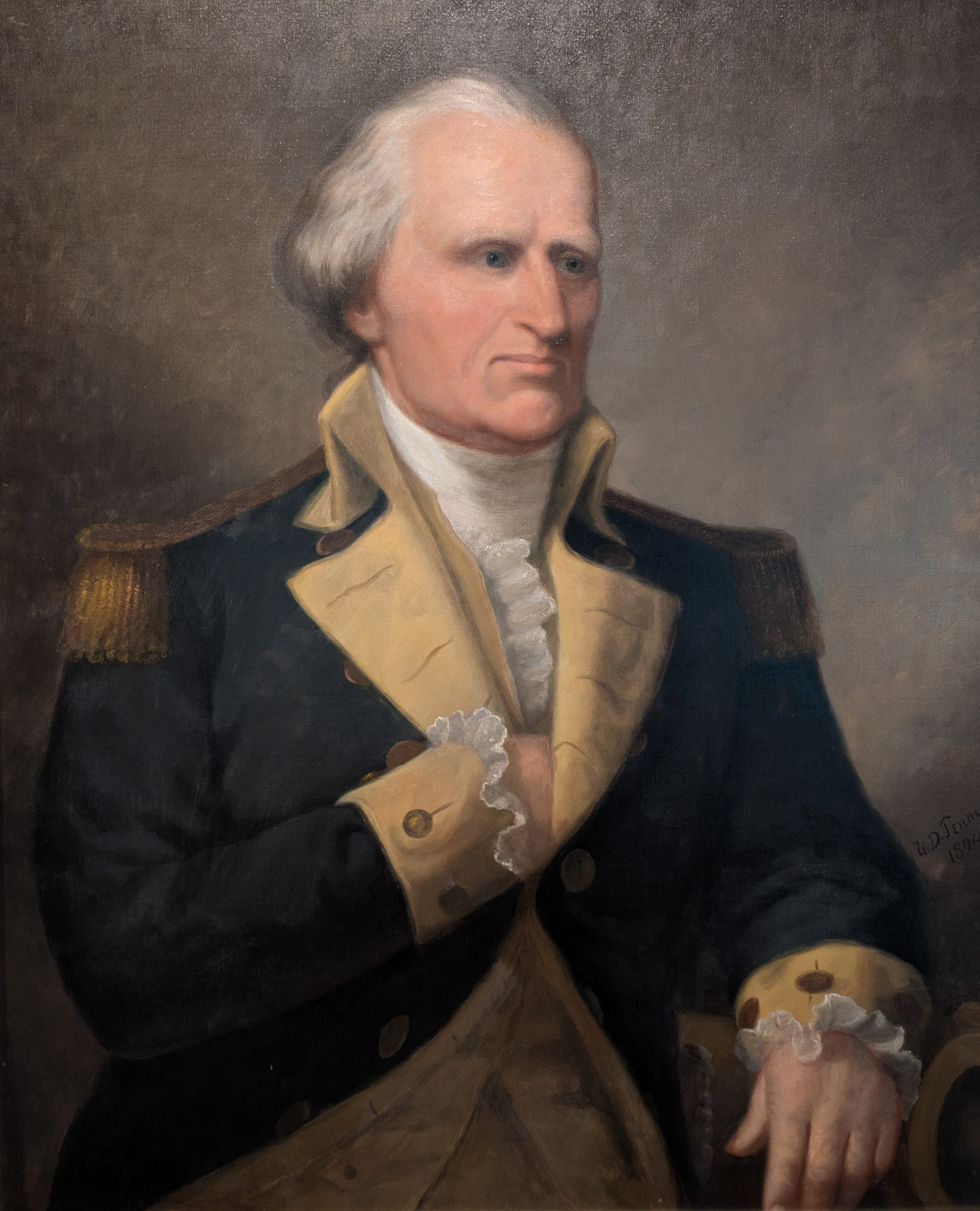
Colonel John Stark led the Colonial expedition.

Vice-Admiral Graves, apparently acting on intelligence that the Colonials might make attempts on the islands, posted guard boats near Noddle's Island. These were longboats that included detachments of Marines. Sources disagree as to whether or not any regulars or marines were stationed on Noddle's Island to protect the naval supplies.

The "regiment now at Medford" mentioned by the Committee of Safety was Colonel John Stark's 1st New Hampshire Regiment of about 300 men stationed near Winter Hill with its headquarters in Medford. Taking his instructions from General Ward, Stark and his regiment crossed the bridge over the Mystic River just after midnight on May 27. Their route took them far to the north of Chelsea Creek through Malden and parts of what are now the cities of Everett and Revere. Additional local men most likely joined them during their march. Hog Island was accessible at low tide from the east by fording Belle Isle Creek near the current location of Belle Isle Marsh Reservation. This crossing was effected without Graves' guard boats taking notice.

Stark began to move his force to Hog Island at about 10 am and directed most of his men to round up livestock there while he forded Crooked Creek to Noddle's Island with a group of thirty men. Stark's small contingent on Noddle's Island scattered into small groups, killed the animals they could find, and set fire to haystacks and barns.

== Battle ==
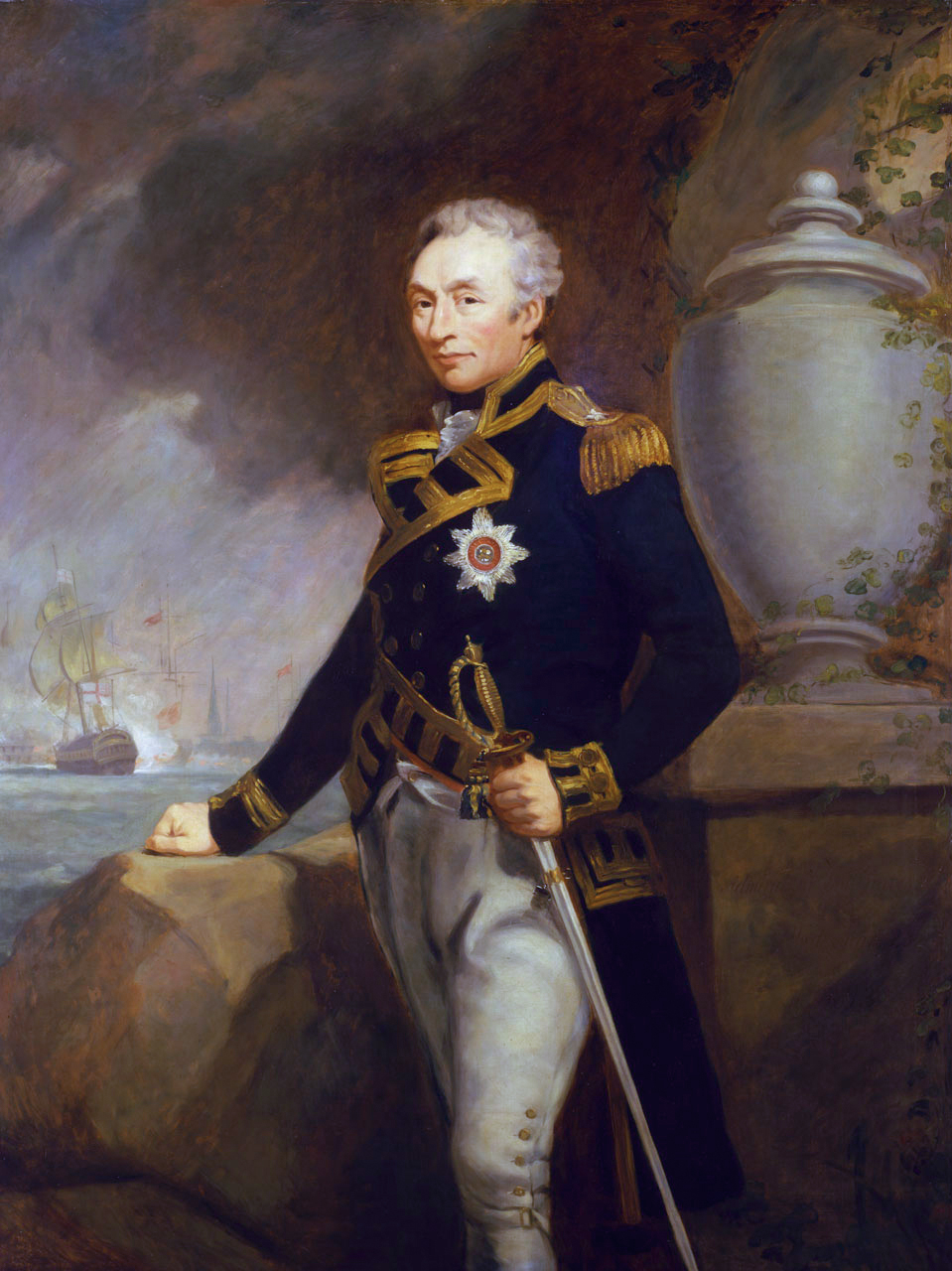
Thomas Graves, who commanded Diana, went on to become an admiral in the Royal Navy.

=== Islands ===
The British first took notice when they spotted the smoke from the burning hay. Vice-Admiral Graves on his flagship, HMS Preston, saw smoke from the burning hay at about 2 pm and signaled for the guard marines to land on Noddle's Island, which they did, engaging Stark's scattered forces. Graves also ordered the schooner Diana, under the command of his nephew Lieutenant Thomas Graves, to sail up Chelsea Creek to support the operation and cut off the colonists' escape. Eventually, a combined force of roughly 400 marines was landed, formed ranks, and began to systematically drive Stark's men back to the east. The colonists fled without fighting until they reached Crooked Creek. There they dropped into marshy ditches and fired on their pursuers from strong defensive positions. A pitched battle followed, in which the colonists "Squat[t]ed down in a Ditch on the ma[r]sh" and engaged in "a hot fiar until the Regulars retreated".

The Marines withdrew from their positions to the interior of Noddle's Island, and Stark's men left Crooked Creek to join the main body of his forces on Hog Island. Diana and the other vessels continued northeast up Chelsea Creek in pursuit. By sunset, hundreds of cattle, sheep, and horses had been driven from Hog Island to the mainland. Also around sunset, Diana turned about in an attempt to avoid being trapped in the shallows of the creek. However, Lieutenant Graves realized he would require assistance, and raised a signal. Vice-Admiral Graves ordered barges manned by marines into the creek to tow Diana out, along with the sloop Britannia, tender of HMS Somerset (under the command of another Graves nephew, Lieutenant John Graves) to assist and provide additional firepower.

Sources disagree on the timing of the dispatching of the various vessels. A number of sources (Frothingham and A Documentary History of Chelsea among them) claim that Diana, Britannia, and the barges were all dispatched together; Nelson and Ketchum, possibly on the basis of more recent research, claim the account as told above.

=== Mainland coast ===
Some of Stark's men were engaged in driving the livestock further up the coast. Others noticed that Diana was in trouble, and called for reinforcements. General Putnam and as many as 1,000 troops (including Warren, who briefly fought before reporting the attack to Ward) came up on the shore near Diana, a place at the mouth of Chelsea Creek, in the modern Chelsea neighborhood by the McArdle bridge to East Boston. Putnam waded out into the harbor up to his waist and offered quarter to the sailors of Diana if they would surrender, but its cannon continued to fire, and attempts to tow her into deeper water continued. Colonial forces continued firing on the ship, supported by two field pieces positioned on the shore. Britannia and field pieces the British had landed on Noddle's Island also joined the cannonade. At about 10 pm, the British rowers were forced to abandon the rescue of Diana due to the heavy fire. Diana drifted and ran aground again on the Mystic River side of the Chelsea coast, tipping onto one side. Lieutenant Graves abandoned Diana and transferred his men to Britannia, which was successfully towed to deeper water.

American forces boarded Diana and rapidly removed everything of value, including guns, rigging, sails, clothing, and money. They laid hay under the stern to serve as kindling, and the vessel was set on fire at about 3:00 am to prevent it from falling back into British hands. The guns recovered were probably used in the American positions during the Battle of Bunker Hill.

== Aftermath ==
This skirmish was apparently the first use of field pieces by the Colonists in the American Revolution. They suffered no fatalities, with only a small number of wounded, and their morale was greatly boosted by the successful capture and destruction of Diana. The action was also a boost to Israel Putnam, whose appointment by the Second Continental Congress as a General in the Continental Army was unanimously approved, in part due to reports of this skirmish.

General Gage was understated in his casualty report to London: "Two men were killed and a few wounded." Others, however, apparently exaggerated, reporting large casualties. The Pennsylvania Journal reported on June 21, 1775, that General Gage himself recorded at least one hundred killed while other sources said more than three hundred. From another source: "The regulars were said to have suffered very much, not to have had less than two hundred killed and wounded. The loss was probably greatly exaggerated; that, however, had a good effect on the provincials. The affair was a matter of no small triumph to them and they felt upon the occasion more courageous than ever." Gage ordered cannon mounted on Copp's Hill in Boston, and Vice-Admiral Graves moved the Somerset, which had been stationed in the shallow waters between Boston and Charlestown, into deeper waters to the east of Boston, where it would have improved maneuverability if fired upon from land. He also belatedly sent a detachment of regulars to secure Noddle's Island; the Colonists had long before removed or destroyed anything of value on the island.

== Geographic changes ==
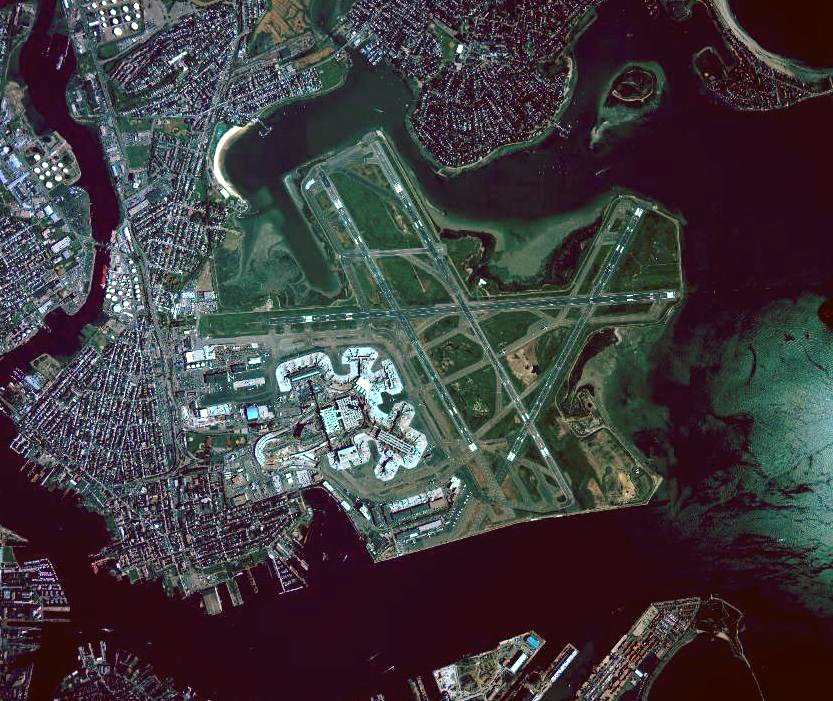
A satellite image of East Boston. The narrow neck visible in the upper left is Chelsea Creek, the boundary between Chelsea and Noddle's and Hog Island. The boundary between Hog Island and the mainland is just out of shot to the upper center. The former boundary between Hog Island and Noddles Island is roughly where the current Constitution Beach is just northwest of the airport

In the years since the American Revolution, the geography of the Boston area has undergone significant expansion, and the islands named Hog and Noddle's are no longer islands. In the late 19th and early 20th century, the channel that separated Noddle's and Hog was filled in, and that between Hog Island and the mainland was filled in over the course of the late 19th century and early 20th century leaving just a small, narrow creek between the former islands and the mainland. In terms of modern geography, the Orient Heights neighborhood of East Boston is the present location of Hog Island and nearby Breeds Island, and much of the remainder of East Boston is what was then Noddle's Island. The Chelsea Creek has been narrowed due to the expansion of Chelsea and has been dredged and straightened to create a deep shipping channel.

While occasional attempts have been made to locate the remains of the Diana in Chelsea Creek, which has been extensively dredged and industrialized in the years since the battle, no wrecks found in that body have been identified as hers. In 2009, the National Park Service gave funds for a state-led effort to locate the wreck.
