= Chelsea Creek =

Waterway in the Boston area

Chelsea Creek Federal Name: Chelsea River
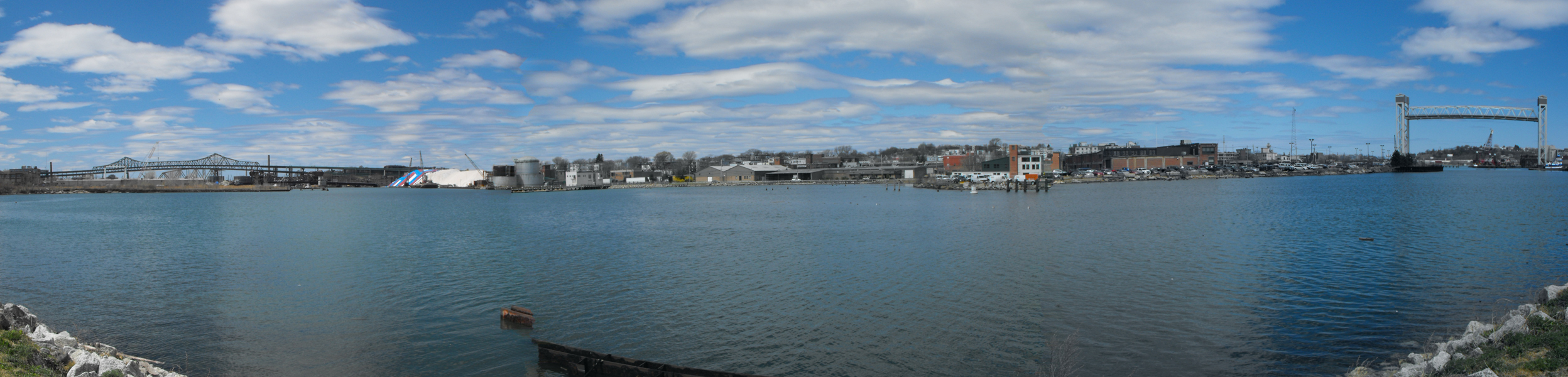
- View across toward Chelsea from East Boston.

Location
- Country: United States
- State: Massachusetts
- Cities: Chelsea, Revere, Boston

Physical characteristics
- Source
  - location: Revere, Massachusetts, United States
- Mouth: Mystic River
  - location: Boston, Massachusetts, United States
  - coordinates: 42°23′1″N 71°2′36″W
  - elevation: 0 ft (0 m)

Chelsea Creek, shown on federal maps as the Chelsea River, is a 2.6-mile-long (4.2 km) waterway that runs along the shore of Chelsea, Massachusetts, and separates that community from the cities of Boston and Revere, as well as feeding part of the current Belle Isle Marsh Reservation that separates Boston from Revere. It is one of 10 designated port areas in Massachusetts.

The creek starts as Mill Creek at a former pond at the intersection of Revere Beach Parkway (Massachusetts Route 16) and U.S. Route 1, now a shopping center. Mill Creek meanders east for 0.5 mile, then takes a sharp turn south, becoming Chelsea Creek, and widens significantly as it runs between Chelsea and the neighborhood of East Boston. In that area, the waterway is used by oil tankers to transport fuel to adjacent oil tanks. The creek then turns southwest and runs into the Mystic River shortly before it empties into Boston Harbor.

All of the jet fuel used at Logan International Airport is stored along the Chelsea Creek, with 70–80 percent of the heating fuel in New England, and road salt for approximately 350 communities across the region.

In May 1775, the American colonists won the first offensive victory of the American Revolution over the British, in a naval battle known as the Battle of Chelsea Creek.

== Crossings ==
- Chelsea Parkway Plaza, between Chelsea and Revere (source)
- Broadway, between Chelsea and Revere
- former Slade Mill at Mill Street, Revere
- MBTA Commuter Rail Newburyport/Rockport Line
- Chelsea Street Bridge
- Andrew P. McArdle Memorial Bridge
