= USS Philadelphia (1776) =

Gundalow of the Continental Navy

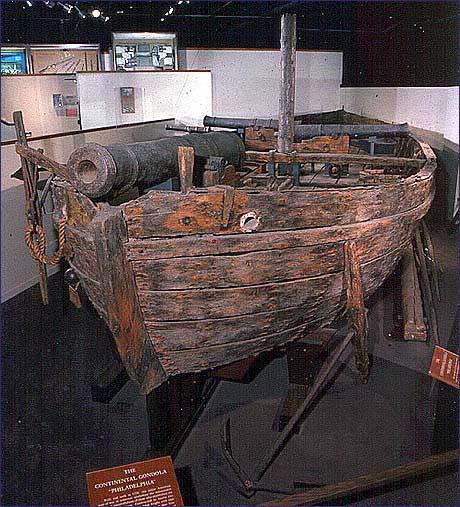
- Philadelphia on display at the National Museum of American History

History

United States
- Name: Philadelphia
- Namesake: City of Philadelphia
- Builder: Hermanus Schuyler
- Laid down: July 1776
- Launched: August 1776
- Completed: August 1776
- Fate: Sunk, 11 October 1776; Raised, 2 August 1935
- Status: On public display

General characteristics
- Type: Gundalow
- Displacement: 29 long tons (29 t)
- Length: 53 ft (16 m)
- Beam: 15 ft (4.6 m)
- Draft: 2 ft (0.61 m)
- Depth: 4 ft (1.2 m)
- Complement: 45
- Armament: 1 × 12-pounder long gun; 2 × 9-pounder guns
- Philadelphia (Gundalow)
- U.S. National Register of Historic Places
- U.S. National Historic Landmark
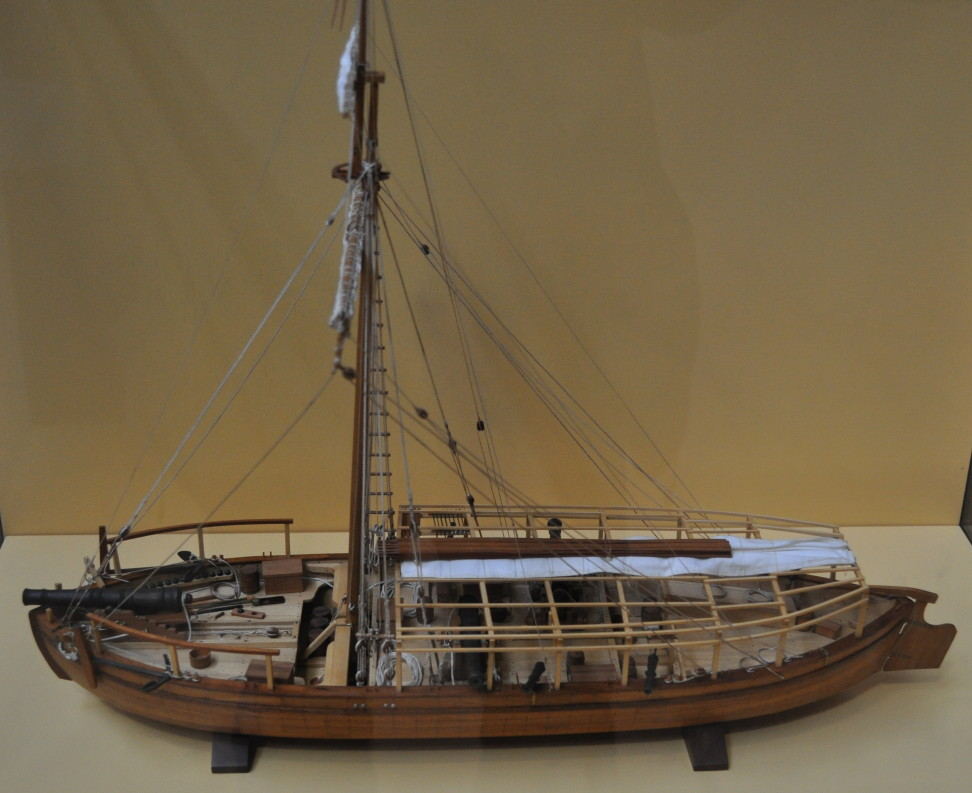
- Model of Philadelphia as built

- Location within the District of Columbia
- Location: 14th St. and Constitution Ave., NW; Washington, D.C.
- Coordinates: 38°53′28.4″N 77°1′46.1″W
- Built: 1776
- Architect: Hermanus Schuyler
- NRHP reference No.: 66000852

Significant dates
- Added to NRHP: 15 October 1966
- Designated NHL: 20 January 1961

USS Philadelphia was a 3-gun gundalow of the Continental Navy. She was constructed from July–August 1776 for service during the American Revolutionary War. Manned by Continental Army soldiers, she was part of a fleet under the command of General Benedict Arnold that fought against the British Royal Navy in the Battle of Valcour Island on Lake Champlain. Philadelphia was sunk during the battle on 11 October 1776.

In 1935, amateur military marine archaeologist Lorenzo Hagglund located her remains standing upright at the bottom of Lake Champlain. The wreck was raised to the surface and salvaged. In 1961 she was bequeathed to the Smithsonian Institution. Philadelphia and associated artifacts are part of the permanent collection of the National Museum of American History in Washington, D.C., where curator Philip K. Lundeberg was responsible for arranging her initial display. The vessel is listed on the National Register of Historic Places and is a National Historic Landmark.

== Background ==
The American Revolutionary War, which began in April 1775 with the Battles of Lexington and Concord, widened in September 1775 when the Continental Army embarked on an invasion of the British Province of Quebec. The province was viewed by the Second Continental Congress as a potential avenue for British forces to attack and divide the colonies and was lightly defended. The invasion reached a peak on 31 December 1775, when the Battle of Quebec ended in disaster for the Americans. In the spring of 1776, 10,000 British and German troops arrived in Quebec, and General Guy Carleton, the provincial governor, drove the Continental Army out of Quebec and back to Fort Ticonderoga.

Carleton then launched his own offensive intended to reach the Hudson River, whose navigable length begins south of Lake Champlain and extends down to New York City. Control of the upper Hudson would enable the British to link their forces in Quebec with those in New York, recently captured in the New York campaign by Major General William Howe. This strategy would separate the American colonies of New England from those farther south and potentially quash the rebellion.

Following the American retreat from Quebec, the only ships on the lake were those of a small fleet of lightly armed ships that General Benedict Arnold had assembled following the capture of Fort Ticonderoga in May 1775. This fleet, even if it had been in British hands, was too small to transport the large British army to Fort Ticonderoga.

== Fleet development ==
During their retreat from Quebec, the Americans carefully took or destroyed all ships on Lake Champlain that might prove useful to the British. When Arnold and his troops, making up the rear guard of the army, abandoned Fort Saint-Jean, they burned or sank all the boats that they could not use and set fire to the sawmill and the fort. These actions effectively denied the British any hope of immediately moving onto the lake.

The two sides set about building fleets: the British at Saint-Jean and the Americans at the other end of the lake in Skenesborough (present-day Whitehall, New York). While planning Quebec's general defenses in 1775, Carleton had anticipated the problem of transportation on Lake Champlain and had requested the provisioning of prefabricated ships from Europe. Because of this planning, the British were able to assemble a fleet that significantly overpowered that of the Americans. In total, the British fleet (25 armed vessels) had more firepower than the Americans' 15 vessels, with more than 80 guns outweighing the 74 smaller American guns.

The American shipbuilding effort at Skenesborough was overseen by Hermanus Schuyler (possibly a relation of Major General Philip Schuyler), and the outfitting was managed by military engineer Jeduthan Baldwin. Schuyler began work in April to produce boats larger and more suitable for combat than the small shallow-draft boats known as bateaux that were used for transport on the lake. The process eventually came to involve Arnold, who was an experienced ship's captain, and David Waterbury, a Connecticut militia leader with maritime experience. Major General Horatio Gates, in charge of the overall defense of the lake, asked Arnold to take more responsibility in the shipbuilding effort because "I am intirely uninform'd as to Marine Affairs."

== Construction ==
Philadelphia was one of eight gundalows (also called gondolas in contemporary documents) constructed at Skenesborough. She was laid down early in July 1776 and launched in mid-August. Constructed primarily of oak, she was larger than a bateaux at 53 ft 2 in (16.21 m) long with a beam of 15 ft 2 in (4.62 m). She featured a single 36-foot (10.97 m) mast with square-rigged sail and topsail, and mounted three cannons, one 12-pounder (5.4 kg) facing forward and two 9 pounders (4.1 kg) facing port and starboard respectively. She also had mounting points for up to eight swivel guns and was estimated by the Smithsonian to displace 29 long tons (32.5 short tons; 29.5 t). Late in her construction, Arnold ordered that her aft deck be raised to accommodate a mortar. After the mortar exploded during a test firing at Fort Ticonderoga, this modification was undone. To maintain equilibrium, ballast rocks were probably used in the aft portion of the boat once the mortar was removed. For the relative comfort of its crew, the boat had a canvas awning aft of the mast, and fascines were probably lashed to its sides to diffuse musket fire aimed at the boat.

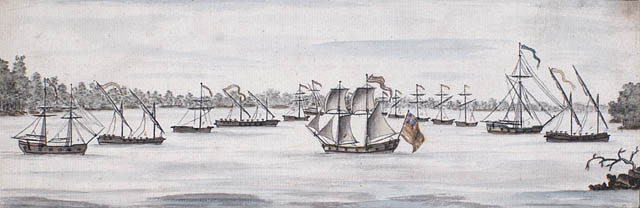
Contemporary watercolor depicting the American line of battle

== Service history ==
Philadelphia was placed in service under Captain Benjamin Rue of Philadelphia shortly after completion. Late in August, Arnold assembled his fleet and cruised provocatively on the northern stretches of Lake Champlain. On 23 September, in anticipation of the larger British fleet's arrival, he stationed his ships in Valcour Bay, the strait separating the western shore of the lake from Valcour Island. When the two forces clashed on 11 October, Philadelphia was under the command of Rue and was part of the formation Arnold established in the Valcour strait. Early in the six-hour fight the 12-gun American schooner Royal Savage ran aground and was burned. Toward dusk the British guns holed Philadelphia with a 24-pound (10.9 kg) shot, and she sank. Darkness ended the action, and Arnold was able to slip away during the night. Many of his remaining ships were burned, sunk, or captured over the next two days as the British pursued him toward Ticonderoga.

In sea trials of the replica Philadelphia II, the Lake Champlain Maritime Museum determined that the boat was not particularly maneuverable: contemporary accounts of sailing the vessels include reports that the gondolas skipped across the waters of the lake, blown by the wind, and needed safe shelter when winds were high.

== Raising the wreck ==
In the 1930s, Lorenzo Hagglund, a veteran of World War I and a history buff, began searching the strait for remains of the battle. In 1932 he found the remains of Royal Savage's hull, which he successfully raised in 1935. Hagglund discovered Philadelphia's remains in 1935, sitting upright on the lake bottom. He raised her that year; in addition to the guns and hull, hundreds of other items were recovered from the vessel. These relics included shot, cooking utensils, tools, buttons, buckles and human bones.

Philadelphia was exhibited at various locations on Lake Champlain and the Hudson River before becoming a long-term display at Exeter, New York. Hagglund spent years searching for other ships in Arnold's fleet, and he raised another gunboat in 1952. Funding for a structure to house that find and Royal Savage fell through, and that boat's remains were eventually ruined through neglect and looting.

Hagglund approached the Smithsonian Institution to preserve Philadelphia, and in 1961 he bequeathed her and associated artifacts to that organization. According to the Whitehall Times, the remains had suffered more damage during their time above water than below. The boat and artifacts are now part of the permanent collection of the National Museum of American History, in Washington, D.C. She is listed on the National Register of Historic Places and is designated a National Historic Landmark. She remains in precarious condition: as of 2001 the wood and iron fittings continued to show signs of deterioration despite attempts to stabilize them.

In 1997, another pristine underwater wreck was located during a survey by the Lake Champlain Maritime Museum. Two years later, it was conclusively identified as the gundalow Spitfire.

== Bibliography ==
- Bratten, John R (2002). The Gondola Philadelphia and the Battle of Lake Champlain. College Station, Texas: Texas A&M University Press. ISBN 978-1-58544-147-1. OCLC 48003125.
- Cubbison, Douglas (2010). The American Northern Theater Army in 1776. Jefferson, NC: McFarland. ISBN 9780786445646. OCLC 368031977.
- Hamilton, Edward (1964). Fort Ticonderoga, Key to a Continent. Boston: Little, Brown. OCLC 965281.
- Malcolmson, Robert (2001). Warships of the Great Lakes 1754–1834. Annapolis, Maryland: Naval Institute Press. ISBN 1-55750-910-7. OCLC 47213837. This work contains detailed specifications for most of the watercraft used in the Battle of Valcour Island, as well as copies of draft documents for some of them.
- Miller, Nathan (1974). Sea of Glory: The Continental Navy Fights for Independence. New York: David McKay. ISBN 0-679-50392-7. OCLC 844299.
- Morrissey, Brendan (2003). Quebec 1775: The American Invasion of Canada. Hook, Adam [translator]. Oxford: Osprey Publishing. ISBN 978-1-84176-681-2. OCLC 52359702.
- Nelson, James L (2006). Benedict Arnold's Navy. New York: McGraw Hill. ISBN 978-0-07-146806-0. OCLC 255396879.
- Silverstone, Paul H (2006). The Sailing Navy, 1775–1854: 1775–1854. New York: CRC Press. ISBN 978-0-415-97872-9. OCLC 63178925.
- Stanley, George (1973). Canada Invaded 1775–1776. Toronto: Hakkert. ISBN 978-0-88866-578-2. OCLC 4807930.
