= USS Revenge (1776) =

Schooner of the Continental Navy

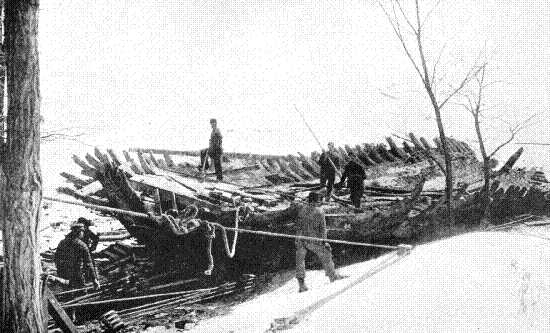
- Remains of the USS Revenge at Fort Ticonderoga

History

United States
- Name: USS Revenge
- Builder: Jeduthan Baldwin
- Launched: 1776
- Commissioned: 1776
- Decommissioned: 1777
- Fate: Unknown. Possibly captured by British forces in July 1777

General characteristics
- Type: Schooner
- Complement: 50 officers and enlisted
- Armament: 4 × 4-pounder guns; 4 × 2-pounder guns

Service record
- Operations: Battle of Valcour Island

USS Revenge was an 8-gun schooner of the Continental Navy. Revenge was built in the summer of 1776 by Colonel Jeduthan Baldwin at Fort Ticonderoga, New York.

The schooner, commanded by a Captain Seaman, joined the flotilla commanded by General Benedict Arnold at Crown Point. She got underway at sunset on 24 August and headed north along the New York shore of Lake Champlain. Two days later, when Connecticut lost a mast during a storm, Revenge towed the damaged gundalow out of danger of grounding. In the weeks that followed, the ships maneuvered on the lake enabling the green crews, for the most part made up of landsmen, to learn the ways of the sea.

Meanwhile, the British were building a fleet farther north, and were preparing to challenge Arnold for control of the lake. Naval supremacy would enable the King's troops assembled in Canada to drive down the strategic Lake Champlain-Hudson River corridor to New York. Success of this British strategy would cut the American colonies in two, beginning a dismemberment process by which the "redcoats" could defeat the "rebels" in detail and restore Royal authority in North America.

The two forces met on 11 October in the Battle of Valcour Island, fought in the strait between Valcour Island and the lake's western shore where Arnold had stationed his ships. In the action, the outgunned Americans suffered a tactical defeat, but won a great strategic victory by delaying the British advance for a year - a year in which the Americans strengthened their Army enough to capture General Burgoyne's expeditionary force at Saratoga.

After the battle of Valcour Island, Revenge and the other remaining American ships retired farther up the lake. Only Revenge, another schooner, two galleys, and a sloop reached the protection of Fort Ticonderoga. She remained on the upper lake until she was taken early in July 1777 when a British force under General Burgoyne captured Fort Ticonderoga. However, some sources indicate that the schooner may have been burned and sunk to prevent capture.

== Disposition ==
The August/September 1909 issue of The Vermonter magazine (page 238) includes a photo of the remains of a ship with a caption, "The Revenge, one of the battleships of Benedict Arnold's fleet. - This vessel, with two others, escaped to shelter of Fort Ticonderoga, after a running battle with a superior British force in 1776. In January 1909, it was recovered from the lake bottom and is now on exhibition near the lake shore at Fort Ticonderoga." Included is also this short description, excerpted from a tercentenary tour of the lake by dignitaries aboard the steamboat Ticonderoga (now on display at the Shelburne Museum), which says, "Ashore in the shadow of Ti's high bluff - we come upon a curious relic - a water-beaten hulk, some fifty feet long, ribs and planking quite intact, set on piers and surrounded by a fence. This is placarded as the schooner Revenge, one of Arnold's fleet escaped to shelter of the Fort in '76, to be burned and sunk by Col. Brown the following year."

That reference in The Vermonter presumably refers to the Col. John Brown, whose destruction of ships is mentioned in a plaque honoring him, erected in 1935 by the Massachusetts Society of the Colonial Dames of America and located in Fort Ticonderoga, which reads, "Col. John Brown of Pittsfield, Mass. killed October 19th, 1780 at Stone Arabia, N.Y. on his thirty-fifth birthday. Was with Ethan Allen, May 10th, 1775. Made a gallant attempt to retake the fort September 17th to 22nd, 1777 but failed owing to the sturdy defence of Brig. Gen. Henry W. Powell. Colonel Brown destroyed the shipping and outer works, captured 225 British and Germans and released 100 American prisoners."

Timbers from the Revenge were used by Ernest F. Birmingham, editor and publisher of the Fourth Estate weekly newspaper, to create a chair for President Warren G. Harding which was presented to him at his Inauguration in 1921. This chair currently resides in the Harding Home in Marion, Ohio.
