= Charles Terrot (British Army officer) =

British army officer

General Charles Terrot
- Born: 1 May 1758; Berwick-upon-Tweed
- Died: 23 September 1839 (aged 81); Newcastle-upon-Tyne
- Military career
- Allegiance: Great Britain; United Kingdom
- Branch: British Army
- Service years: 1774–1814
- Rank: General
- Conflicts: American Revolutionary War; Third Anglo-Mysore War; French Revolutionary Wars; Helder Expedition; Napoleonic Wars; Walcheren Campaign

General Charles Terrot (1 May 1758 – 23 September 1839) was a British Army officer.

== Life ==
=== America ===
Charles Terrot was born at Berwick-upon-Tweed on 1 May 1758. He entered the Royal Military Academy at Woolwich on 15 March 1771, and received a commission as second lieutenant in the Royal Artillery on 1 March 1774. He went to North America in 1776 and joined Sir Guy Carleton in May at Quebec, Canada. He served under Brigadier-general Fraser at the action of the Three Rivers on 7 June, when the American attack was repulsed, and the Americans, having been driven with great loss to their boats on Lake St. François, fell back on Ticonderoga.

In June 1777 Terrot was with the army of General Burgoyne which pushed forward from Canada by Lake Champlain to effect a junction at Albany with Clinton's forces from New York. Burgoyne reached Ticonderoga on 1 July, and invested the place. On 6 July the Americans evacuated it, and Terrot took part in the capture of Mount Independence and the other operations following the American retreat. On the departure of Burgoyne for Stillwater, Terrot was left under Brigadier-general Powel at Ticonderoga, where he commanded the artillery. This place and Mount Independence were attacked on 18 September by the Americans under Colonel Brown, who had surprised a small sloop and the transport boats, and captured a detachment of the 53rd regiment. The attack lasted four days, at the end of which the Americans were beaten off.

==== Engineering ====
After Burgoyne's surrender at Saratoga, Terrot returned to Canada. On 7 July 1779 he was promoted to be first lieutenant. In 1780 he went to Lake Ontario with two 6-pounders in an expedition under Sir John Johnson; but circumstances altered their destination when on the lake, and Terrot remained at Niagara for nearly four years, principally employed as an assistant military engineer. The works of defence at Niagara were completely repaired under his supervision. In 1782 he surveyed the country between Lakes Erie and Ontario with a view to its purchase by the Government from the Indians, and to mark out its boundaries. He afterwards conducted the negotiations with the Indians with complete satisfaction to them and with great advantage to the Government. On 8 March 1784 he was promoted to be second captain when he returned to England, and served at various home stations with his company.

=== East Indies ===
In 1791 Terrot volunteered for service in the East Indies, and arrived on 10 October at Madras with two companies of Royal Artillery, of which he was quartermaster. He joined the army of Lord Cornwallis at Savandrug on 12 January 1792, and was attached to the artillery park. He took part on 6 February in the night attack on, and capture of, Tipu Sultan's fortified camp, on the north side of the Kaveri River, covering Seringpatam, and in the siege of that city until terms of peace were agreed to. He marched on 26 March with the army which reached Madras at the end of May. On the declaration of war by France against Great Britain, measures were taken to seize the different French factories in India. In August 1793 Terrot was employed against Pondicherry, and when the governor, Colonel Prosper de Clermont, on being summoned, refused to submit, he took part in the bombardment of 20 August and in the siege, which, however, lasted only till the 23rd of that month, when the place capitulated. Terrot was promoted to be first captain on 25 September 1793, and returned to England.

=== Holland ===
On 1 March 1794 Terrot was promoted to be brevet major for his services, and appointed to a command of artillery at Portsmouth. On 1 January 1798 he was promoted to be brevet lieutenant-colonel, and in the following year was employed in the Expedition to the Helder. He accompanied the first division under Sir Ralph Abercromby, landing on 27 August, and took part in the fighting on 10 September, in the Battle of Bergen on 19 September under the Duke of York, at the fight near Alkmaar on 2 October, and the affair of Beverwyk on 6 October. Terms having been settled with the French, Terrot returned in November to England; he was shipwrecked near Yarmouth harbour, and, although all lives were saved by the boats of the fleet, he lost all his effects.

On 12 November 1800 Terrot was promoted to be regimental major, and on 14 October 1801 to be regimental lieutenant-colonel. After ordinary regimental duty for some years, he was promoted to be colonel in the Royal Artillery on 1 June 1806. In July 1809 he accompanied the Expedition to the Scheldt under the Earl of Chatham, and directed the artillery of the attack at the Siege of Flushing, which place capitulated on 15 August. Terrot was thanked in orders for his services at Walcheren.

=== Promotions, retirement, and death ===
Terrot was promoted to be major-general on 4 June 1811. In 1814 he was appointed as a major-general on the staff to command the Royal Artillery at Gibraltar, in succession to Major-general Smith, but the latter, owing to the death of the Governor, succeeded to the command of the fortress, and refused to be relieved. After vainly waiting some months for the arrival of a new governor, Terrot obtained permission to return to England, resigned his appointment, and retired on 25 June 1814 on full pay. He was promoted to be lieutenant-general on 12 August 1819, and general on 10 January 1837. He died at Newcastle-on-Tyne on 23 September 1839.

== Bibliography ==
- Vetch, Robert Hamilton (1898). "Terrot, Charles (1758-1839)" . In Lee, Sidney (ed.). Dictionary of National Biography. Vol. 56. London: Smith, Elder & Co. pp. 81–82.
- Vetch, R. H.; Annis, P. G. W. (2004). "Terrot, Charles (1758–1839)". In Oxford Dictionary of National Biography. Oxford: Oxford University Press.
