= Hubbardton Military Road =

Military road in Vermont, United States

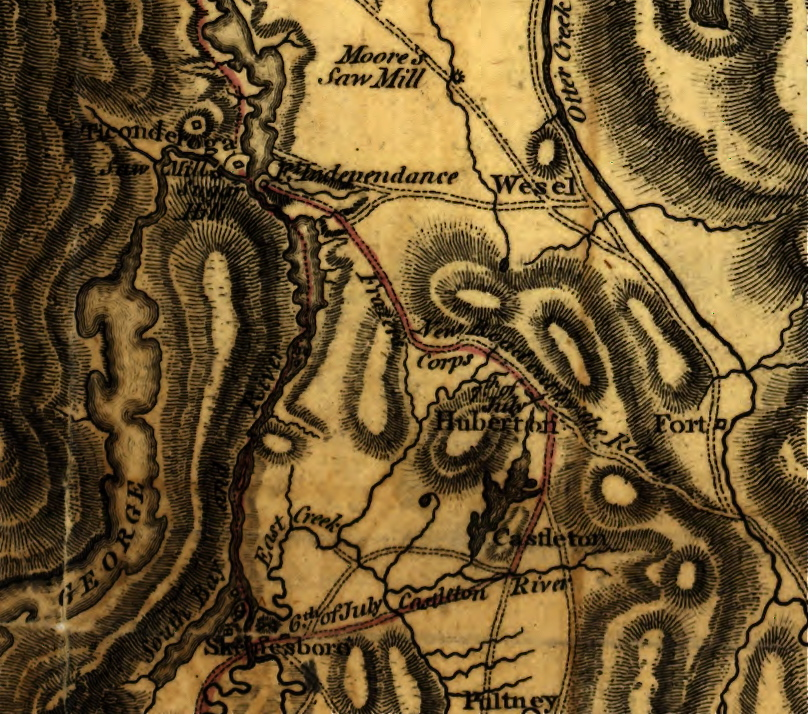
A 1780 map of the Hubbardton Military Road, which originally appeared in General John Burgoyne's A State of the Expedition from Canada. The map shows a "New Road Cut by the Rebels."

The Hubbardton Military Road was originally a trail cut through the wilderness of western Vermont, during the American Revolutionary War to connect fortifications on Lake Champlain with existing roads and frontier settlements, so that the Continental Army could be reinforced and supplied.

The road stretched about 35 mi (56 km) from the fortifications on Mount Independence in today's Orwell, Vermont, to Rutland (today's "Center Rutland") where it joined an older military road that ran diagonally from the ruins of the originally British fort Crown Point southeast to the Fort at Number 4 on the Connecticut River in Charlestown, New Hampshire.

The Hubbardton Military Road was constructed in the fall of 1776 under orders from patriot Major General Horatio Gates. On July 6, 1777, most of the Continental Army's Northern Department, stationed on either side of Lake Champlain at Ticonderoga and Mount Independence, retreated on the road and were pursued by British and German troops, culminating in a rear guard action, the Battle of Hubbardton, on the morning of July 7.

After the war, this supply road was abandoned by the military and became farmland and forest. Although most of the route is known, local historians continue to study maps and terrain seeking to understand obscure details.
