= Charles Terrot =

Charles Terrot may refer to:

- Charles Terrot (bishop) (1790–1872), Scottish Episcopalian bishop, theologian and mathematician
- Charles Terrot (British Army officer) (1758–1839), English army officer in the Royal Artillery
- Charles Terrot (fl. 19th century), co-founder of Terrot, a motorcycle manufacturer in Dijon, France
