= ICMM =

ICMM may refer to:

- International Committee of Military Medicine
- International Congress of Maritime Museums
- International Council on Mining and Metals
- Indo Ceylon Merger Movement (Inththiya Ilanggai Innaippu Iyakkam), a Sri Lankan Tamil militant group
