= Lundeberg =

Lundeberg is a Swedish surname that may refer to

- Åke Lundeberg (1888–1939), Swedish sports shooter
- Christian Lundeberg (1842–1911), Swedish politician
- Harry Lundeberg (1901–1957), American merchant seaman and labor leader
- Helen Lundeberg (1908–1999), American painter
- Philip K. Lundeberg (1923–2019), American naval historian

== See also ==
- Lundeberg Derby Monument
