= Philip K. Lundeberg =

American naval historian (1923–2019)

- Born: Philip Karl Lundeberg; June 14, 1923; Minneapolis, Minnesota, U.S.
- Died: October 3, 2019 (aged 96); Alexandria, Virginia, U.S.
- Education: Duke University; Harvard University
- Scientific career
- Fields: Military history
- Workplaces: United States Naval Academy; Museum of History and Technology; Smithsonian Institution; Museum of History and Technology; Council of American Maritime Museums; United States National Museum; International Congress of Maritime Museums; International Council of Museums

Philip Karl Lundeberg (June 14, 1923 – October 3, 2019) was an American naval historian and curator emeritus of the Smithsonian Institutions National Museum of American History. At the time of his death in 2019, Lundeberg was the last survivor of the USS Frederick C. Davis sinking.

== Early life, education, and naval service ==
Philip Lundeberg was born in Minneapolis, Minnesota in June 1923. In early 1944, he received his bachelor's degree, summa cum laude, from Duke University. Upon graduation, he attended the U.S. Naval Reserve Midshipmen School at Columbia University, where he was commissioned an ensign. Assigned to USS Frederick C. Davis (DE-136), he was the youngest of the three surviving officers when that ship became the last American warship sunk in the Battle of the Atlantic. After World War II, he returned to Duke University to earn a master's degree in history in 1947, and then went on to Harvard University, where he completed his Ph.D. in 1954 with a dissertation entitled "American Anti-Submarine Operations in the Atlantic, 1943-45," under the supervision of Professor Samuel Eliot Morison.

== Professional career ==
As he was completing his doctoral work at Harvard in 1953, St. Olaf College appointed him as an instructor in history and he rose there to assistant professor before the United States Naval Academy appointed him to its faculty in 1955. In the 1950s he assisted his mentor, Samuel Eliot Morison, in preparing volume 10, The Atlantic Battle Won, May 1943-May 1945 for Morison's multi-volume work on the History of United States Naval Operations in World War II. In January 1959, the Smithsonian Institution hired Lundeberg as a consultant in the Department of Armed Forces History in the Museum of History and Technology and then, in June 1959, appointed him Associate Curator in the Division of Naval History. From 1961 to 1984, he was promoted to curator in the National Museum of American History, and in 1984 appointed a Curator in the Smithsonian's Division of Transportation. At the Smithsonian, Lundeberg developed naval exhibits for the Hall of Armed Forces, including the display of the Continental Navy Gondola Philadelphia. "Working with Howard I. Chapelle, he directed the construction of some thirty museum-quality scale models to illustrate the development of American warship design. In 1981, he organized the Smithsonian's exhibition to mark the 200th anniversary of the Battle of Yorktown, entitled "By Sea and By Land: Victory with the Help of France." He also prepared the naval elements in the Smithsonian's exhibits on "Centennial, 1876," and Commodore Matthew C. Perry's expedition to Japan. Following his retirement, he worked on the Smithsonian's major exhibit, "Magnificent Voyagers: The U.S. Exploring Expedition, 1838-1842" led by Lieutenant Charles Wilkes. At the Smithsonian he also directed the 1975 conference of the International Commission on Military History, "La Technique Militaire," as well as their 1982 conference, "Soldier Statesmen of the Age of the Enlightenment."

== Other Professional activities ==
He held numerous positions in a number of national and international organizations. He was a founder of the North American Society for Oceanic History in 1972-73; vice president and then president of the American Military Institute in 1968-73; chairman of the Council of American Maritime Museums, 1976–78; and president of the United States Commission on Military History, 1974-1981. He was also the organizing chairman for International Congress of Maritime Museums at London in 1972, and a secretary of the International Committee on Museum Security of the International Council of Museums. Additionally, he was a member of the National Trust for Historic Preservation's Committee on Maritime Preservation.

== Publications ==
- The Continental gunboat Philadelphia and the Northern Campaign of 1776. Washington, Smithsonian Institution, 1966.
- "Undersea warfare and allied strategy in World War I", Smithsonian Journal of History, Vol. 1, (1966).
- Bibliographie de l'histoire des grandes routes maritimes, tome II, États-Unis d'Amérique, edited by Philip K. Lundeberg. Lisbon: Fundaçao Calouste Gulbenkian, 1970.
- Samuel Colt's submarine battery: the secret and the enigma. Washington, Smithsonian Institution Press, 1974.
- Naval manoeuvres off the Chesapeake, September 1781 1981
- The gunboat Philadelphia and the defense of Lake Champlain in 1776 by Philip K. Lundeberg with an afterword by Arthur B. Cohn. Basin Harbor, Vt.: Lake Champlain Maritime Museum, 1995.
- Dr. Philip Karl Boraas Lundeberg: oral history conducted by David F. Winkler. Washington, D.C.: Oral History Program, Naval Historical Foundation, 2003.

== Awards ==
- K. Jack Bauer Award of the North American Society for Oceanic History, 1998.
- Commodore Dudley W. Knox Naval History Lifetime Achievement Award, 2013.
