= Jeduthan Baldwin =

Continental Army officer and military engineer (1732–1788)

- Born: January 13, 1732; Woburn, Province of Massachusetts Bay
- Died: June 4, 1788 (aged 56); Brookfield, Massachusetts, U.S.
- Military career
- Allegiance: United States
- Branch: Continental Army
- Service years: 1755–1782
- Rank: Colonel
- Units: Corps of Engineers; Baldwin’s Regiment of Artificers
- Conflicts: French and Indian War; Siege of Boston; Battle of Bunker Hill; New York and New Jersey campaign Battle of Valcour Island; Saratoga campaign Fortifications at West Point
- Other work: Surveyor, diarist

Jeduthan Baldwin (January 13, 1732 – June 4, 1788) was an American military engineer and officer in the Continental Army during the American Revolutionary War. A veteran of the French and Indian War, he is best remembered for his engineering work on fortifications at the Siege of Boston, Fort Ticonderoga, Mount Independence, and West Point, as well as for his detailed wartime journal, published in 1906. In 1906 the U.S. War Department honored his service by naming Fort Baldwin in Maine after him.

== Early life ==
Baldwin was born in Woburn, Massachusetts. Some records list his birth year as 1730 or 1731. On April 28, 1757, he married Lucy Parkman, daughter of Ebenezer Parkman, a Congregational minister in Westborough, Massachusetts; the marriage notice was registered on February 12, 1757. They had five children, though two died young. After his service in the French and Indian War, and prior to the American Revolution, Baldwin served as a member of the Massachusetts Provincial Congress in 1774 and 1775.

== French and Indian War ==
Baldwin commanded a company during the French and Indian War, gaining early experience as an engineer and surveyor.

== American Revolution ==
Baldwin entered the beginning of the American Revolutionary war as a engineer in 1775. In 1776 Baldwin was promoted twice, from lieutenant colonel of engineers to colonel of engineers.

== Siege of Boston ==
In 1775, Baldwin took part in the Siege of Boston as an engineer and was present at the Battle of Bunker Hill, where he helped construct American fortifications. On March 16, 1776, he was appointed assistant engineer with the rank of captain in the Continental Army. George Washington personally recommended him in a letter to John Hancock dated April 22, 1776. He was subsequently promoted to lieutenant colonel on April 26 and to colonel of engineers on September 3, 1776.

=== New York, Valcour Bay, Ticonderoga, and Mount Independence ===
Later in 1776, Baldwin was sent to New York, where he supervised construction of defensive works. That fall, at Skenesborough, he outfitted a fleet of 15 ships for Benedict Arnold, including the Revenge, which participated in the Battle of Valcour Island.

In 1777 he worked with Tadeusz Kościuszko under General Arthur St. Clair on the fortifications of Fort Ticonderoga and Mount Independence, which together formed the main American stronghold on Lake Champlain.

=== West Point and later service ===
In 1780, Baldwin was again associated with Kosciuszko and St. Clair in constructing the works at West Point. In addition to his engineering duties, he organized several companies of artificers that were later formed into Baldwin's Regiment of Artificers. He resigned his commission on April 26, 1782.

== Shays's Rebellion ==
In 1787, Baldwin participated in the suppression of Shays's Rebellion, an armed uprising in western Massachusetts led by Daniel Shays and other discontented farmers protesting economic injustices and government oppression. Baldwin served as a member of the state militia forces mobilized to quell the insurrection. His contributions included participating in the trials of the rebellion's leaders, which were held in April and May 1787.

== Journal ==
Baldwin kept a detailed journal from 1775 to 1778, recording daily events and his engineering work. Published in 1906 as The Revolutionary Journal of Col. Jeduthan Baldwin, it is regarded as one of the most important first-hand narratives of the Revolutionary War, particularly for details of the Siege of Boston.

== Death and legacy ==
Baldwin died on June 4, 1788, in Brookfield, Massachusetts, aged 56. He was an original member of the Society of the Cincinnati, an organization founded by officers of the Continental Army to preserve the ideals and fellowship of the Revolutionary generation.

In 1906, U.S. Secretary of War ordered that the military reservation at the mouth of the Kennebec River in Maine be named Fort Baldwin in his honor.

=== In popular culture ===
Baldwin appears as a minor character in Diana Gabaldon's historical novel An Echo in the Bone, which depicts events of the American Revolutionary War.

== See also ==
- USS Revenge (1776)
