= Ebenezer Parkman =

American Congregational minister

- Born: 1703; Boston, Suffolk County, Massachusetts Bay
- Died: 1782 (aged 78–79); Westborough, Worcester County, Massachusetts, United States
- Burial place: Memorial Cemetery, Westborough, Massachusetts
- Education: Harvard University
- Occupation: Congregational minister
- Years active: 1724–1782
- Spouses: Mary Champney (m. 1724–1735); Hannah Breck (m. 1737)
- Children: Ebenezer Parkman II, Lucy Parkman, 10 others

Ebenezer Parkman (1703–1782) was an American Congregational minister who founded the Congregational Church in Westborough, Massachusetts. A Harvard graduate, he served as the town's minister for nearly six decades, helping establish its early religious community. His detailed diary and church records are considered among the most valuable sources for the study of colonial New England religion and society. His daughter Lucy married Jeduthan Baldwin, linking Parkman's family to another prominent Massachusetts lineage.

== Early life and education ==
Parkman was born in 1703 in Boston, Suffolk County, Massachusetts Bay, the son of William Parkman and Elizabeth (Adams) Parkman. He graduated from Harvard University with a Bachelor of Arts in 1723 and a Master of Arts in 1724.

== Career ==
In 1723, Parkman began preaching and twice occupied the pulpit in Westborough that summer. He was formally installed as the town’s minister in 1724 after a nomination and selection process with Rev. Jacob Eliot. During this period, he built a residence on a hill where the Lyman School later stood. His meticulously kept Westborough church records and diary provide an unparalleled insight into colonial New England religious and social life.

Selections from his diary, covering the years 1719–1750, were published in the Proceedings of the American Antiquarian Society between 1961 and 1964.

== Personal life ==
Parkman married Mary Champney of Cambridge in July 1724. They had two children, Ebenezer Parkman II and Lucy Parkman. His daughter Lucy later married Jeduthan Baldwin. Mary died in 1735. In 1737, Parkman married Hannah Breck, with whom he had eleven children between 1738 and 1761.

== Death and legacy ==
Parkman died in 1782 in Westborough, Worcester County, Massachusetts, and was buried at Memorial Cemetery. He is remembered for his long tenure as minister and for establishing the Congregational Church in Westborough. His diary has been widely used by historians to study New England religious life, community structures, and daily practices.
