= Henry Watson Powell =

British Army general

General Henry Watson Powell
- Born: 1733; England
- Died: 1814 (aged 80–81); Lyme, England
- Military career
- Allegiance: United Kingdom
- Branch: British Army
- Rank: General
- Commands: 2nd battalion, 11th Regiment of Foot; 53rd Regiment of Foot
- Conflicts: Seven Years' War; American Revolutionary War; Saratoga Campaign

General Henry Watson Powell (1733 – 14 July 1814) was a British officer during the Seven Years' War and American Revolutionary War.

Powell was born in England in 1733. He commissioned as a Lieutenant on 10 March 1753, with the 46th Regiment of Foot. He was promoted to captain on 2 September 1756 and given command of the 2nd battalion, 11th Regiment of Foot. That unit was renamed the 64th Regiment of Foot and served in the Seven Years' War in the French West Indies in 1759. Captain Powell also deployed with his regiment to the Americas in 1768.

On 2 June 1770, Powell was promoted to major in the 38th Regiment of Foot. A year later, on 23 July 1771, Powell was promoted to lieutenant colonel and given command of the 53rd Regiment of Foot.

In 1776, Powell came to Canada with the 53rd Regiment of Foot. On 10 June 1776, Sir Guy Carleton appointed Powell as a brigadier-general and placed him in command of the 2nd Brigade. Powell participated in the 1777 Saratoga campaign. With the 53rd Regiment and the Brunswick Prinz Friedrich Regiment, he successfully defended Fort Ticonderoga and Mount Independence from American attacks in 1777, declaring "The Garrison invested to my charge, I shall defend to the last." Weeks after General Burgoyne's surrender, however, BG Powell abandoned Fort Ticonderoga and returned to Canada. He also held commands at Montreal, Fort Niagara, and Quebec during the course of the war.

In 1780, while stationed at Quebec, Powell bought an estate which would later be named Spencer Wood, the Quebec Government House. He returned to England following the war. He was promoted to lieutenant-general on 3 May 1796 and full general on 1 January 1801. He died in 1814 at Lyme, England.

Military offices
Preceded by James Inglis Hamilton	Colonel of the 15th (the Yorkshire East Riding) Regiment of Foot; 1794–1814	Succeeded by Sir Moore Disney
Preceded by Sir Ralph Abercromby	Colonel of the 69th (South Lincolnshire) Regiment of Foot; 1792–1794	Succeeded by Sir Cornelius Cuyler, 1st Baronet
