= International Congress of Maritime Museums =

The International Congress of Maritime Museums (ICMM) is the world's only international network of maritime museums, associations, and individuals devoted to maritime heritage, founded in 1972. It has 120+ members of every size across thirty-five countries and six continents. It convenes biennial congresses hosted by different member museums around the world, publishes a monthly newsletter, and offers resources on its website on subjects including maritime archaeology, historic vessels and maritime curatorship.
