= Fort Ticonderoga =

Historic fort in New York, US

- U.S. National Register of Historic Places
- U.S. National Historic Landmark
- New York State Register of Historic Places
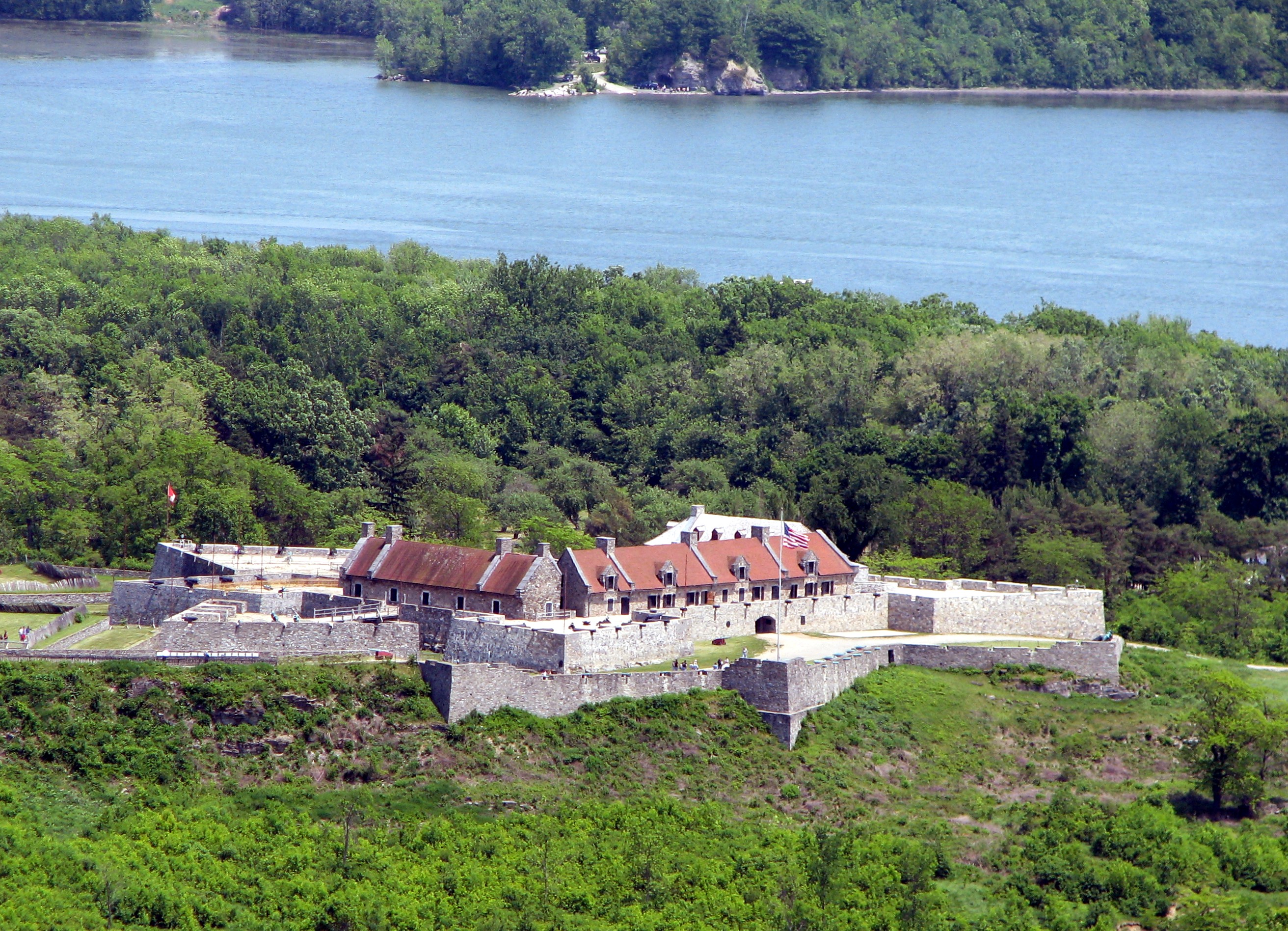
- Fort Ticonderoga from Mount Defiance

- Location within New York Adirondack Park Location within New York Location within the United States
- Location: Ticonderoga, New York
- Nearest city: Rutland, Vermont
- Coordinates: 43°50′30″N 73°23′15″W
- Area: 21,950 acres (34.3 sq mi; 88.8 km^{2})
- Built: 1755–1758
- Architect: Marquis de Lotbinière
- Architectural style: Vauban-style fortress
- NRHP reference No.: 66000519
- NYSRHP No.: 03115.000330

Significant dates
- Added to NRHP: October 15, 1966
- Designated NHL: October 9, 1960
- Designated NYSRHP: June 23, 1980

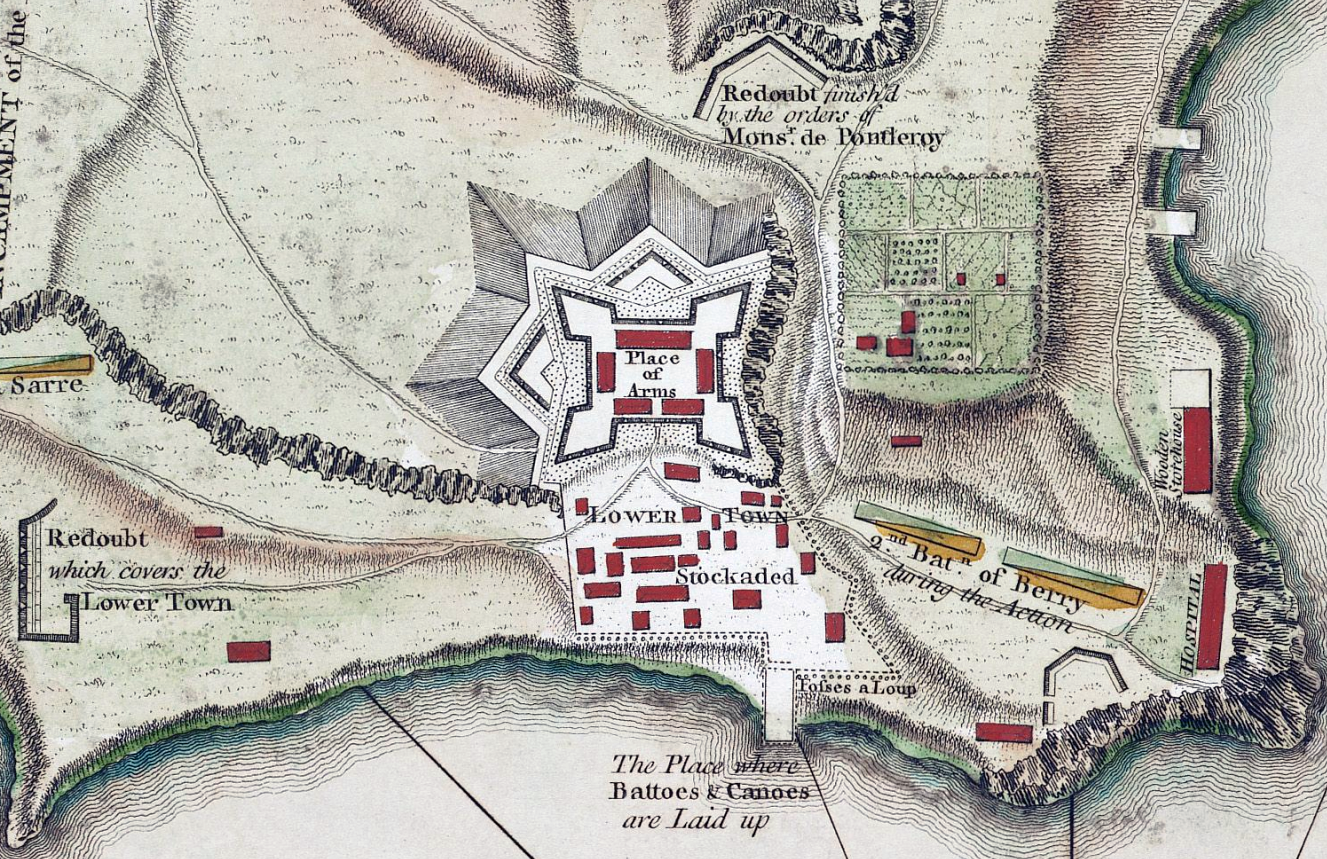
Detail of a 1758 map showing the fort's layout

Fort Ticonderoga (/taɪkɒndəˈroʊɡə/), formerly Fort Carillon, is a large 18th-century star fort built by the French at a narrows near the south end of Lake Champlain in northern New York. It was constructed between October 1755 and 1757 by French-Canadian military engineer Michel Chartier de Lotbinière, Marquis de Lotbinière during the North American phase of the Seven Years' War, known in the United States as the French and Indian War. The fort was of strategic importance during the 18th-century colonial conflicts between Great Britain and France, and again played an important role during the American Revolutionary War.

The site controlled a river portage alongside the mouth of the rapid La Chute River, in the 3.5 miles (5.6 km) between Lake Champlain and Lake George. It was strategically placed for the trade routes between the British-controlled Hudson River Valley and the French-controlled Saint Lawrence River Valley. The terrain amplified the importance of the site. Both lakes were long and narrow and oriented north–south, as were the many ridge lines of the Appalachian Mountains which extend as far south as Georgia. The mountains created nearly impassable terrains to the east and west of the Great Appalachian Valley that the site commanded. The name "Ticonderoga" comes from the Mohawk word tekontaró:ken, meaning "it is at the junction of two waterways".

During the 1758 Battle of Carillon, 4,000 French defenders were able to repel an attack by 16,000 British troops. In 1759, the British returned and drove a token French garrison from the fort. The British controlled the fort at the beginning of the Revolutionary War, but the Green Mountain Boys and other state militia under the command of Ethan Allen and Benedict Arnold captured it on May 10, 1775. Henry Knox led a party to transport many of the fort's cannons to Boston to assist in the siege against the British, who evacuated the city in March 1776. The Americans held the fort until June 1777, when General John Burgoyne's British forces occupied high ground above it; the threat resulted in the Continental Army troops withdrawing from the fort and its surrounding defenses. The only direct attack on the fort during the Revolution took place in September 1777, when John Brown led 500 Americans in an unsuccessful attempt to capture it from about 100 British defenders.

The British abandoned the fort after the failure of the Saratoga campaign, and it ceased to be of military value after 1781. The United States allowed the fort to fall into ruin, and local residents stripped it of much of its usable materials. It was purchased by a private family in 1820 and became a stop on tourist routes of the area. Early in the 20th century, its private owners restored the fort. The Fort Ticonderoga Association operates it as a tourist attraction, museum, and research center.

== Geography and early history ==
Lake Champlain forms part of the border between New York and Vermont, and the Hudson River together formed an important travel route that was used by American Indians long before the arrival of European colonists. The route was relatively free of obstacles to navigation, with only a few portages. One strategically important place on the route lies at a narrows near the southern end of Lake Champlain. Ticonderoga Creek, known in colonial times as La Chute River because it was named by French colonists, enters the lake at this point carrying water from Lake George. The site provides commanding views of the southern extent of Lake Champlain, Mount Defiance, at 853 ft (260 m), and two other hills (Mount Hope and Mount Independence) overlook the area.

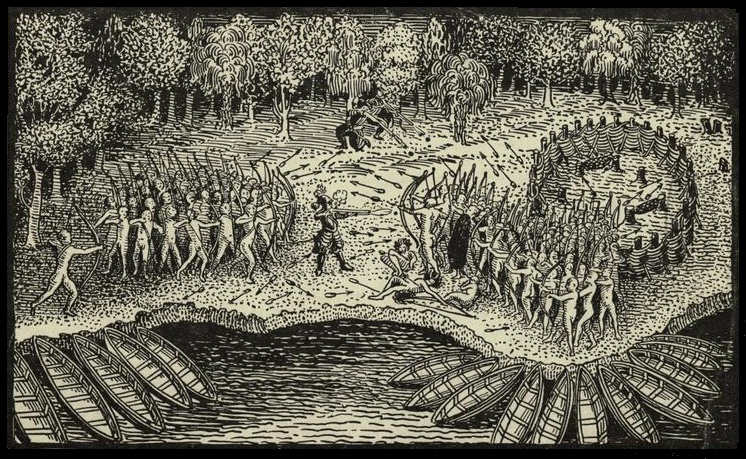
Engraving after a 1609 drawing by Champlain of an American Indian battle near Ticonderoga

American Indians had occupied the area for centuries before French explorer Samuel de Champlain first arrived there in 1609. Champlain recounted that the Algonquins with whom he was traveling battled a group of Haudenosaunee nearby. In 1642, French missionary Isaac Jogues was the first white man to traverse the portage at Ticonderoga while escaping a battle between the Haudenosaunee and members of the Wendat (Huron) tribe.

The French had colonized the Saint Lawrence River valley to the north, and the English had taken over the Dutch settlements that became the Province of New York to the south. The French and English began contesting the area as early as 1691, when Pieter Schuyler built a small wooden fort at the Ticonderoga point on the western shore of the lake. These colonial conflicts reached their height in the French and Indian War, which began in 1754 and is sometimes considered to be the North American front of the Seven Years' War.

== Construction ==
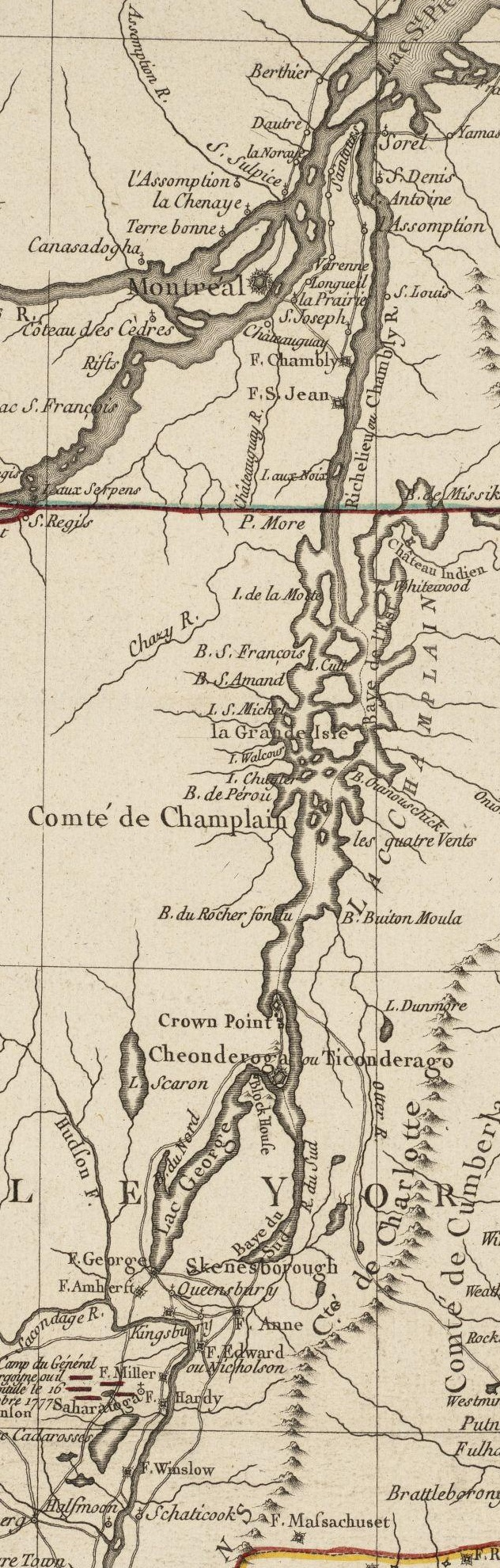
A 1777 map depicting Lake Champlain, Lake George, "Ticonderago", and the upper Hudson River

The French decided to construct a fort here in 1755, following the Battle of Lake George. Marquis de Vaudreuil, the governor of the French Province of Canada, sent his cousin Michel Chartier de Lotbinière to design and construct a fortification at this militarily important site, which the French called Fort Carillon. Some have attributed the name "Carillon" to French officer Philippe de Carrion du Fresnoy, who established a trading post at the site in the late 17th century. It is more commonly attributed to the sounds made by the rapids of La Chute River, which were said to resemble the chiming bells of a carillon. Construction on the star-shaped fort was based on designs of the renowned French military engineer Vauban. It began in October 1755 and proceeded slowly during the warmer-weather months of 1756 and 1757, using troops stationed at nearby Fort St. Frédéric and from Canada.

The work in 1755 consisted primarily of beginning construction on the main walls and on the Lotbinière redoubt, an outwork to the west of the site that provided additional coverage of La Chute River. During the next year, the four main bastions were built, as well as a sawmill on La Chute. Work slowed in 1757, when many of the troops participated in the attack on Fort William Henry. The barracks and demi-lunes were not completed until spring 1758.

=== Walls and bastions ===
The French built the fort to control the south end of Lake Champlain and prevent the British from gaining military access to the lake. Consequently, its most important defenses, the Reine and Germaine bastions, were directed to the northeast and northwest, away from the lake, with two demi-lunes further extending the works on the land side. The Joannes and Languedoc bastions overlooked the lake to the south, providing cover for the landing area outside the fort. The walls were seven feet (2.1 m) high and fourteen feet (4.3 m) thick, and the whole works was surrounded by a glacis and a dry moat five feet (1.5 m) deep and fifteen feet (4.6 m) wide. When the walls were first erected in 1756, they were made of squared wooden timbers, with earth filling the gap. The French then began to dress the walls with stone from a quarry about one mile (1.6 km) away, although this work was never fully completed. When the main defenses became ready for use, the fort was armed with cannons hauled from Montreal and Fort St. Frédéric.

=== Inside and outside ===
The fort contained three barracks and four storehouses. One bastion held a bakery capable of producing 60 loaves of bread a day. A powder magazine was hacked out of the bedrock beneath the Joannes bastion. All the construction within the fort was of stone.

A wooden palisade protected an area outside the fort between the southern wall and the lake shore. This area contained the main landing for the fort and additional storage facilities and other works necessary for maintenance of the fort. When it became apparent in 1756 that the fort was too far to the west of the lake, the French constructed an additional redoubt to the east to enable cannon to cover the lake's narrows.

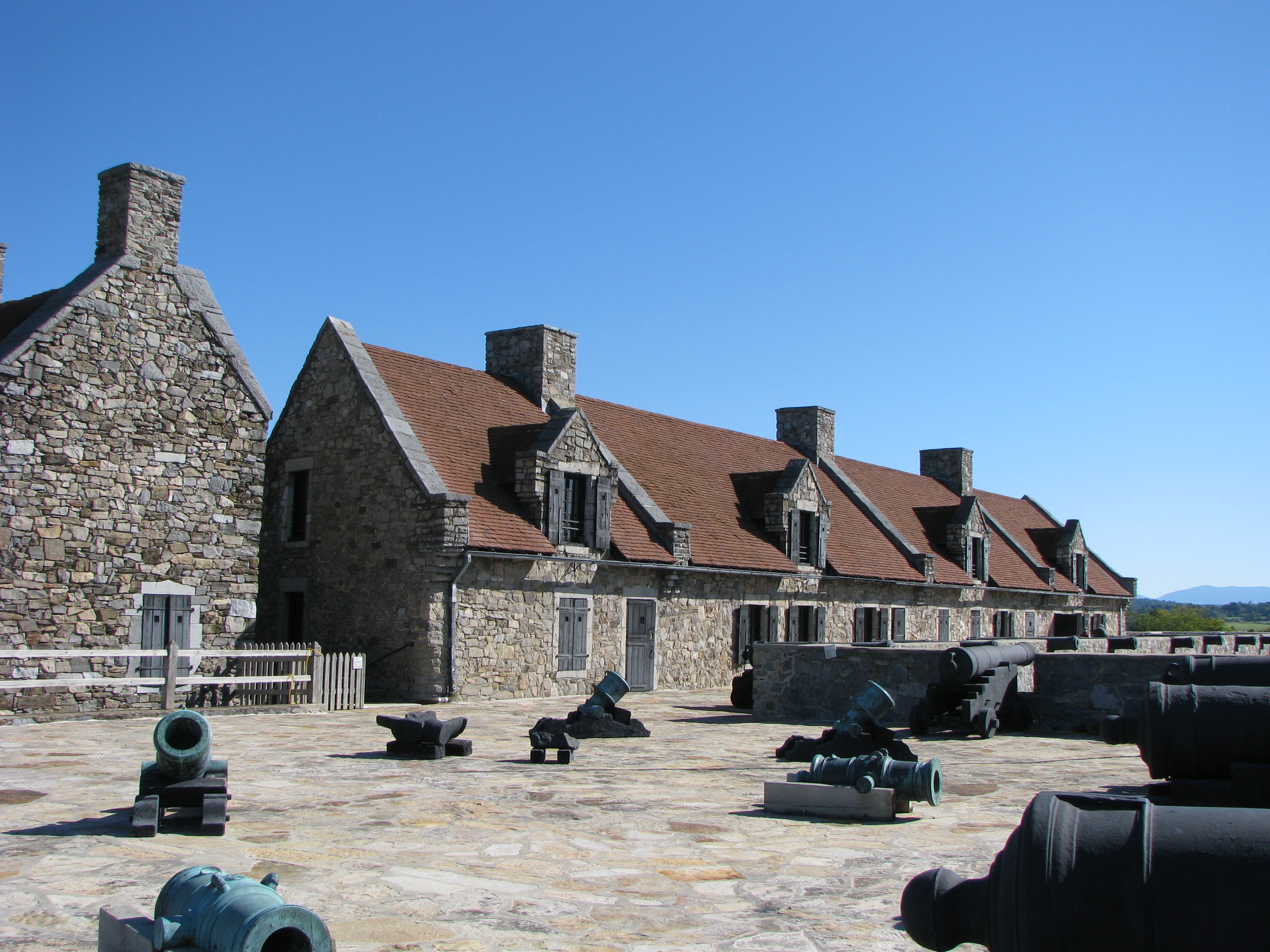
Officers' barracks, right; soldiers' barracks, left

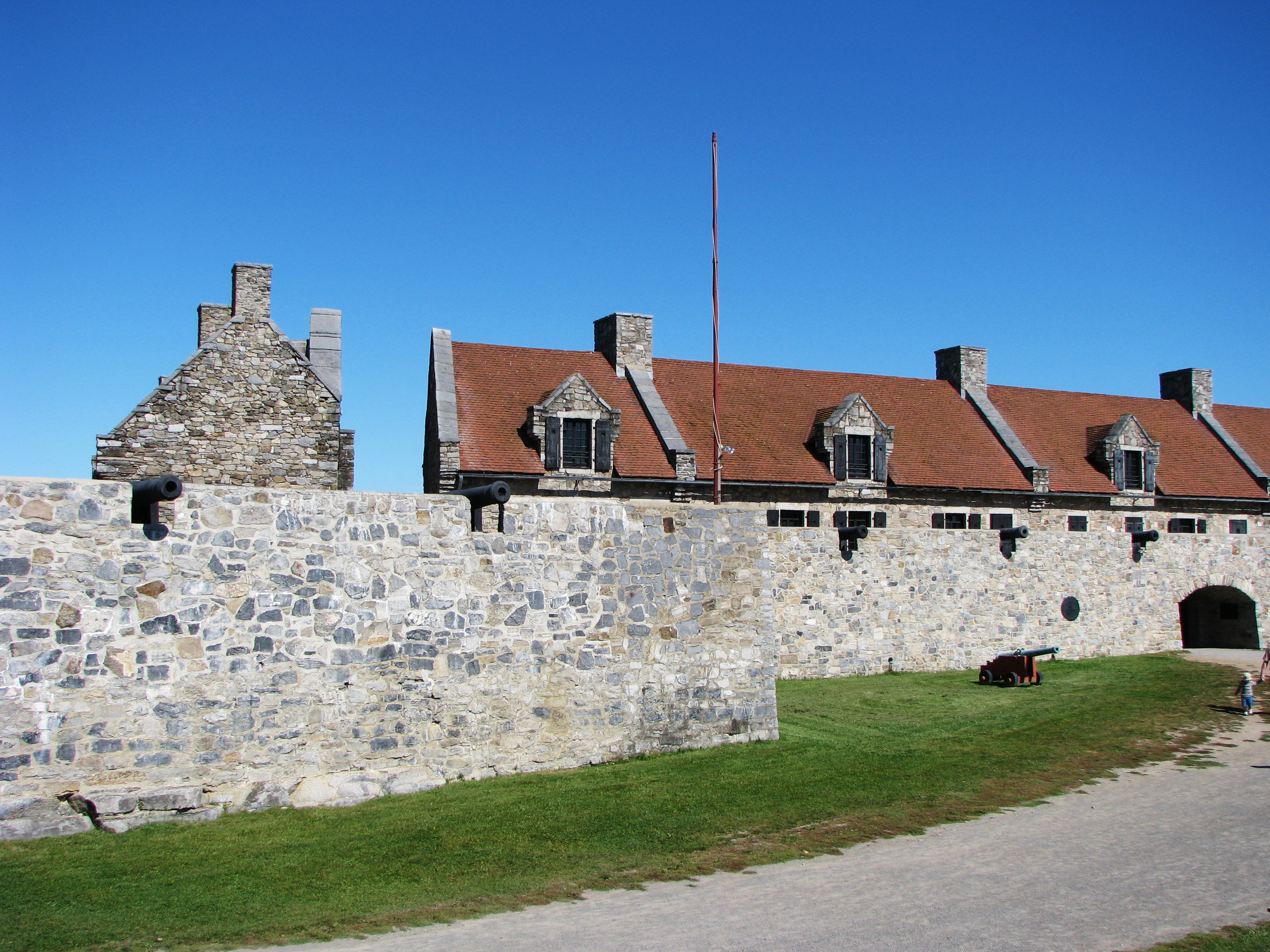
Inside the first wall; officers' barracks at left, soldiers' barracks at right

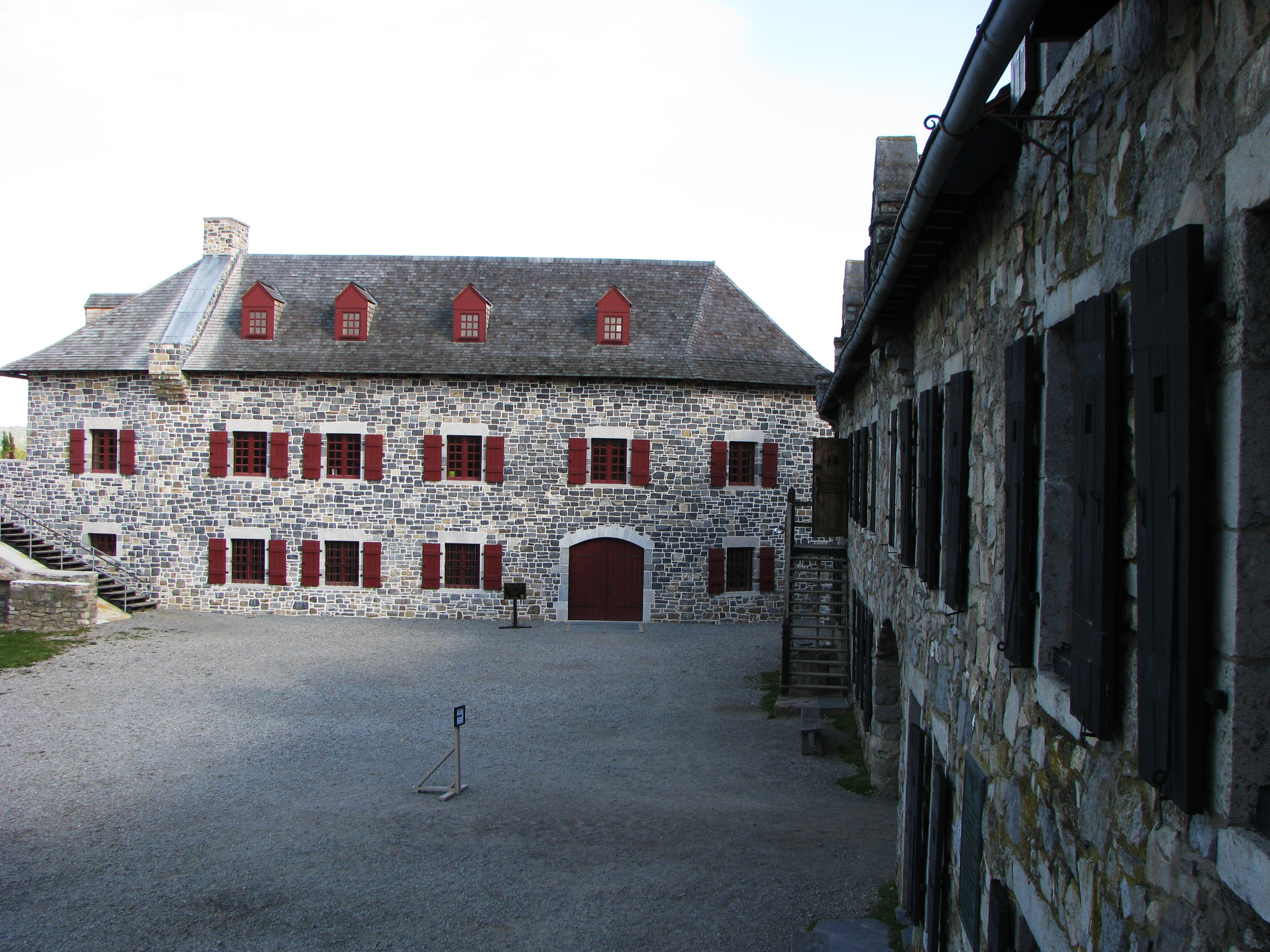
Store room and powder magazine (now Mars Education Center); soldiers' barracks at right

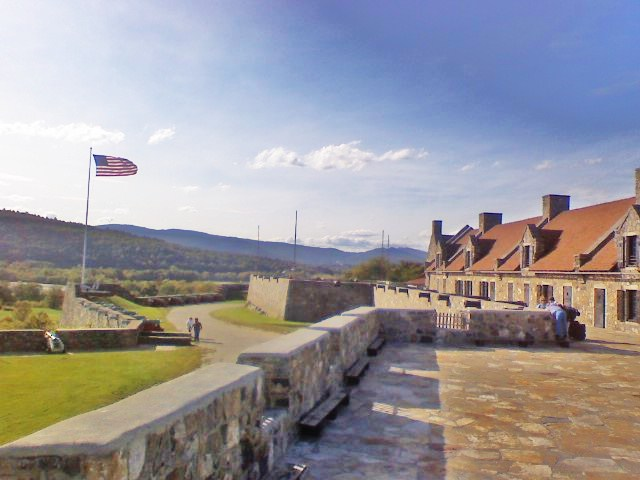
Front of the fort

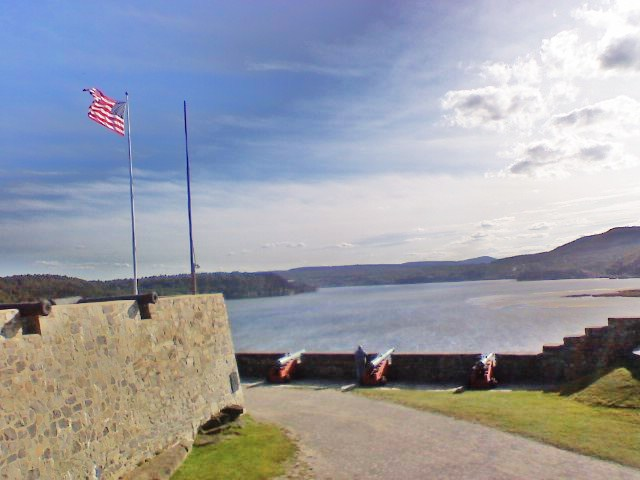
View of the lake from the front

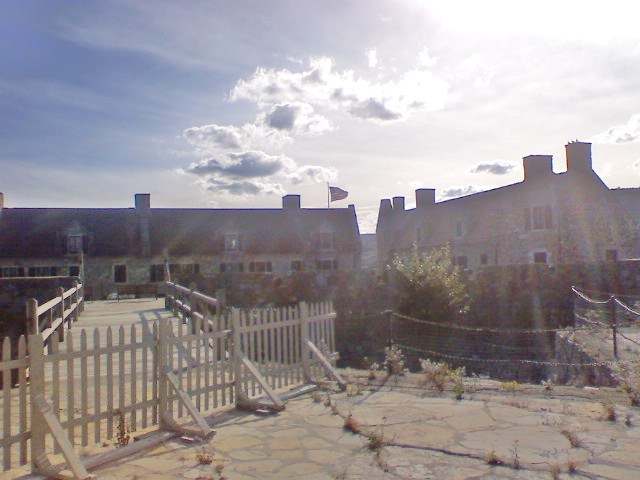
Back view of the fort

== Analysis ==
The fort was largely complete by 1758; the only ongoing work thereafter consisted of dressing the walls with stone. Still, General Montcalm and two of his military engineers surveyed the works in 1758 and found something to criticize in almost every aspect of the fort's construction: the buildings were too tall and thus easier for cannons to hit, the powder magazine leaked, and the masonry was of poor quality. The critics apparently failed to notice the fort's significant strategic weakness: several nearby hills overlooked the fort and made it possible for besiegers to fire down on the defenders from above. Lotbinière's career suffered for years afterwards.

William Nester notes additional problems with the fort's construction. The fort was small for a Vauban-style fort, about 500 feet (150 m) wide, with a barracks capable of holding only 400 soldiers. Storage space inside the fort was similarly limited, requiring the storage of provisions outside the walls in exposed places. Its cistern was small, and the water quality was supposedly poor.

== Military history ==
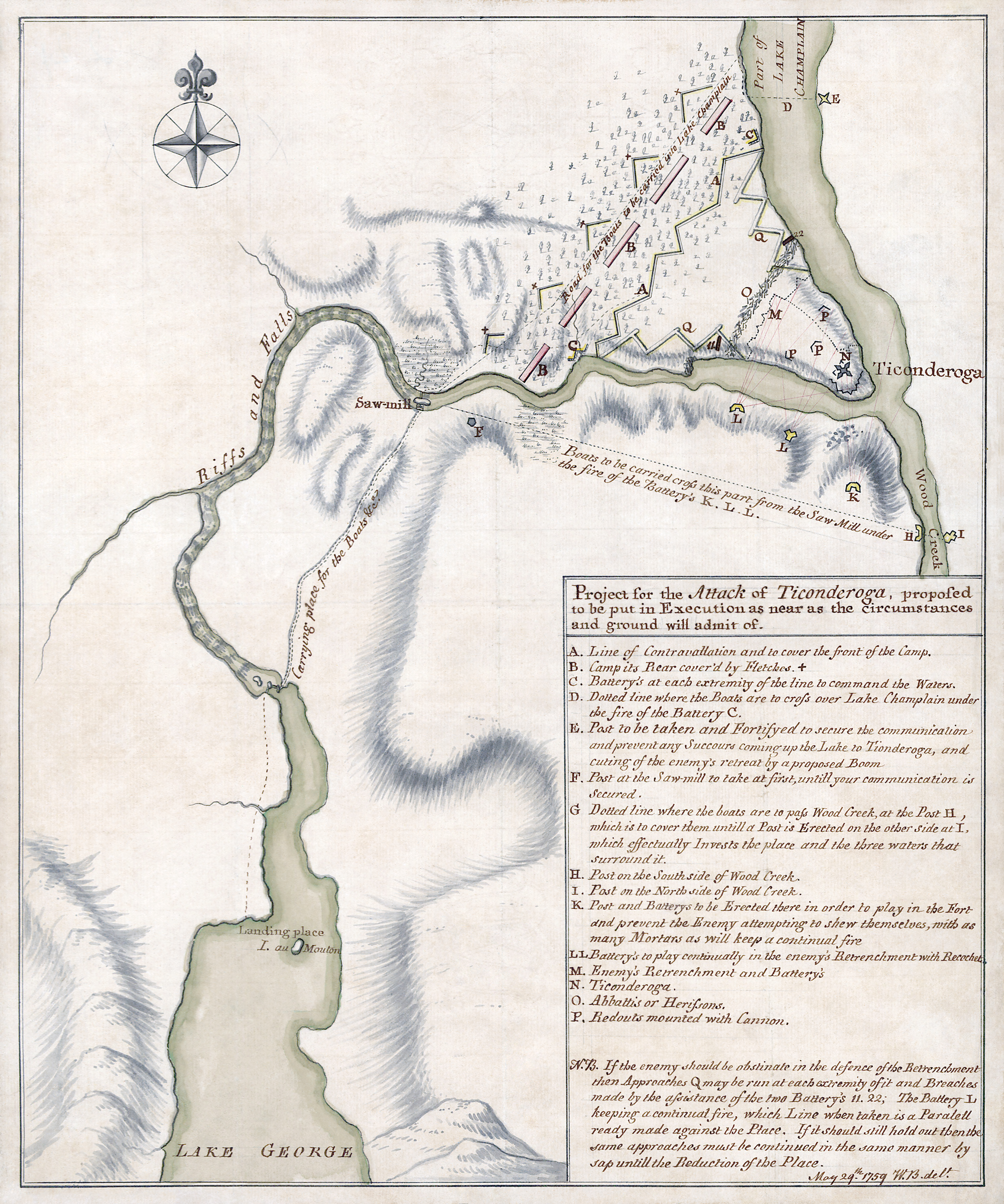
Restored manuscript map, dated May 29, 1759, for the British plan of attack at the 1759 Battle of Ticonderoga

=== French and Indian War ===
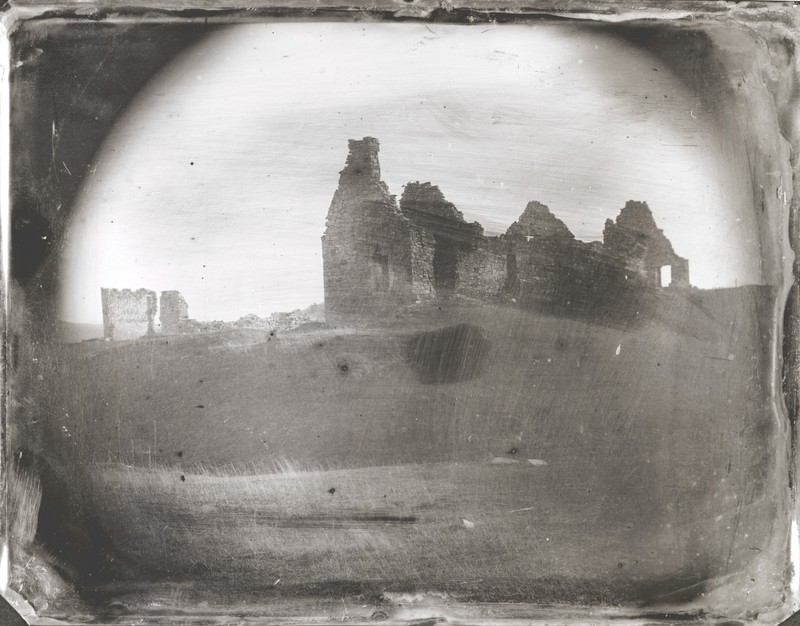
Daguerreotype of the ruins of Fort Ticonderoga

In August 1757, the French captured Fort William Henry in an action launched from Fort Carillon. This and a string of other French victories in 1757 prompted the British to organize a large-scale attack on the fort as part of a multi-campaign strategy against French Canada. In June 1758, British General James Abercromby began amassing a large force at Fort William Henry in preparation for a military campaign directed up the Champlain Valley. These forces landed at the north end of Lake George on July 6, only four miles from the fort. French General Louis-Joseph de Montcalm had only arrived at Carillon in late June, and he engaged his troops in a flurry of work to improve the fort's outer defenses. They built entrenchments in two days around a rise between the fort and Mount Hope, about three-quarters of a mile (one kilometer) northwest of the fort, and then constructed an abatis (felled trees with sharpened branches pointing out) below these entrenchments. They conducted the work unimpeded by military action, as Abercromby failed to advance directly to the fort on July 7. Abercromby's second-in-command was Brigadier General George Howe, who had been killed when his column encountered a French reconnaissance troop. Abercromby felt Howe's death "most heavily" and may have been unwilling to act immediately.

On July 8, 1758, Abercromby ordered a frontal attack against the hastily assembled French works. He tried to move rapidly against the few French defenders, opting to forgo field cannon and relying instead on the numerical superiority of his 16,000 troops, but the British were soundly defeated by the 4,000 French defenders in the Battle of Carillon. The battle took place far enough away from the fort that its guns were rarely used. The battle gave the fort a reputation for impregnability, which affected future military operations in the area, notably during the American Revolutionary War. Following the French victory, Montcalm anticipated further British attacks, so he ordered additional work on the defenses, including the construction of the Germain and Pontleroy redoubts to the northeast of the fort, named for the engineers under whose direction they were constructed. However, the British did not attack again in 1758, so the French withdrew all but a small garrison in November for the winter.

The British under General Jeffery Amherst captured the fort the following year in the 1759 Battle of Ticonderoga. In this confrontation, 11,000 British troops used emplaced artillery and drove off the token garrison of 400 Frenchmen. The French used explosives to destroy what they could of the fort as they withdrew and spiked the cannons that they did not take with them. The British worked to repair and improve the fort in 1759-60, but it was not part of any further significant action in the war. After the war, the British garrisoned the fort with a small number of troops and allowed it to fall into disrepair. Colonel Frederick Haldimand was in command of the fort in 1773, and he wrote that it was "in ruinous condition".

=== Early Revolutionary War ===
In 1775, Fort Ticonderoga was in disrepair but still manned by a token British force. They found it extremely useful as a supply and communication link between Canada and New York. A small American force surprised the 48 British soldiers within the fort on May 10, 1775, less than one month after the American Revolutionary War was ignited with the battles of Lexington and Concord. The Americans consisted of Vermont's Green Mountain Boys led by Ethan Allen, and militia volunteers from Massachusetts and Connecticut led by Benedict Arnold. Allen called out, "Come out you old Rat!" to the fort's commander Captain William Delaplace. He also demanded that the British commander surrender the fort "in the name of the Great Jehovah and the Continental Congress!" The surrender demand was actually made to Lieutenant Jocelyn Feltham and not the fort's commander, but Delaplace did later appear and surrender his sword.

With the capture of the fort, the Patriot forces obtained a large supply of cannons and other armaments, much of which Henry Knox transported to Boston during the winter of 1775–1776. Ticonderoga's cannons were instrumental in ending the siege of Boston when they were used to fortify Dorchester Heights, forcing the British to evacuate the city in March 1776. The capture of Fort Ticonderoga by the Americans also made communication much more difficult between the British commands in Canada and America.

Benedict Arnold remained in control of the fort until a thousand Connecticut troops arrived in June 1775 under the command of Benjamin Hinman. However, Arnold was never notified that Hinman was to take command due to a series of political maneuvers and miscommunications. A delegation from Massachusetts arrived to clarify the matter, and Arnold resigned his commission and departed, leaving the fort in Hinman's hands.

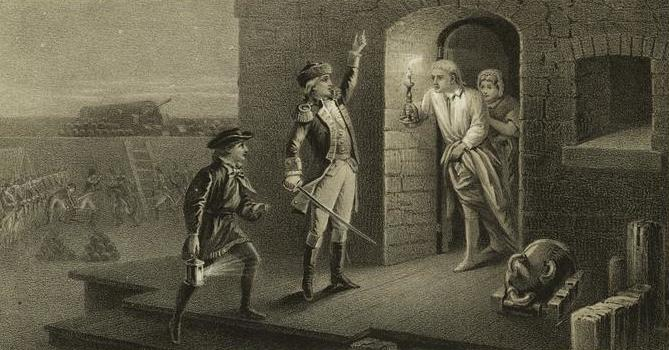
Ethan Allen demanding that the fort be surrendered

Beginning in July 1775, Ticonderoga was used as a staging area for the invasion of Quebec, planned to begin in September under the leadership of generals Philip Schuyler and Richard Montgomery. Men and materials for the invasion were accumulated there through July and August. Montgomery received word on August 28 that British forces at Fort Saint-Jean, not far from the New York–Quebec border, were nearing completion of boats to launch onto Lake Champlain. He launched an invasion, leading 1,200 troops down the lake. Ticonderoga continued to serve as a staging base for the action in Quebec until the battle and siege at Quebec City which resulted in Montgomery's death.

In May 1776, British troops began to arrive at Quebec City, where they broke the Continental Army's siege. The British chased the American forces back to Ticonderoga in June and then moved down Lake Champlain under Guy Carleton in October, after several months of ship building. The British destroyed a small fleet of American gunboats in the Battle of Valcour Island in mid-October, but snow was already falling, so the British retreated to winter quarters in Quebec. About 1,700 troops from the Continental Army wintered at Ticonderoga under the command of Colonel Anthony Wayne. The British offensive resumed the next year in the Saratoga campaign under General John Burgoyne.

=== Saratoga campaign ===
During the summer of 1776, the Americans added substantial defensive works to the area under the direction of General Schuyler, and later under General Horatio Gates. Mount Independence is almost completely surrounded by water, and it was fortified with trenches near the water, a horseshoe artillery battery part way up the side, a citadel at the summit, and redoubts armed with cannons surrounding the summit area. These defenses were linked to Ticonderoga with a floating bridge supported by 20 caissons that were built on the ice and sunk to support what historians call "the Great Bridge." This bridge, the caissons of which were discovered and detailed in the 1960's (and parts of which are on display at Vermont's Mount Independence Museum, was instrumental in forcing the British to abandon the campaign of 1776 and winter in Quebec, thereby delaying their efforts to split the colonies in two by one year. During that year, the revolutionary army removed cannon from the fort and carried it to Boston, led by American General Knox, and break the British blockade of Boston. Thus, the bridge's defense was instrumental in the colonies' success in the war. During that one-year delay, the Continental Army was able to fortify its forces and ultimately defeat General Burgoyne at the Battle of Saratoga, which was the turning point of the war. After this battle, which is the only one in history to result in the death and burial of a British General on US soil, the French government was convinced by the US delegation to fund the war for the first time. The bridge was protected by land batteries on both sides. The works on Mount Hope were improved to include a star-shaped fort. Mount Defiance remained unfortified.

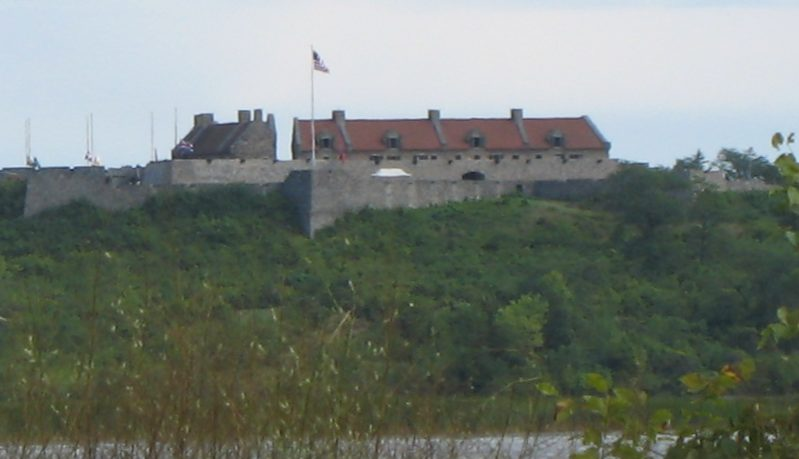
Fort Ticonderoga as seen from Lake Champlain

In March 1777, American generals were strategizing about possible British military movements and thought it likely that the enemy would make an attempt on the Hudson River corridor. General Schuyler headed the forces stationed at Ticonderoga, and he requested 10,000 troops to guard Ticonderoga and 2,000 to guard the Mohawk River valley against British invasion from the north. George Washington had never been to Ticonderoga, but he believed that an overland attack was unlikely from the north because of the alleged impregnability of Ticonderoga. This and continuing incursions up the Hudson River valley by British forces occupying New York City led Washington to believe that any attack on the Albany area would be from the south, as it was part of the supply line to Ticonderoga and would necessitate a withdrawal from the fort. As a result, no significant actions were taken to further fortify Ticonderoga or significantly increase its garrison. The garrison consisted of about 2,000 men under General Arthur St. Clair and was too small to man all the defenses.

General Gates oversaw the northern defenses and was aware that Mount Defiance threatened the fort. John Trumbull had pointed this out as early as 1776, when a shot fired from the fort was able to reach Defiance's summit, and several officers inspecting the hill noted that there were approaches to its summit where gun carriages could be pulled up the sides. The garrison was too small to properly defend all the existing works in the area, so Mount Defiance was left undefended. Anthony Wayne left Ticonderoga in April 1777 to join Washington's army; he reported to Washington that "all [was] well", and that the fort "can never be carried, without much loss of blood".

"Where a goat can go, a man can go; and where a man can go, he can drag a gun."

— British Major General William Phillips, as his men brought cannon to the top of Mount Defiance in 1777

General Burgoyne led 7,800 British and Hessian forces south from Quebec in June 1777. They occupied nearby Fort Crown Point without opposition on June 30, then prepared to besiege Ticonderoga. Burgoyne recognized the tactical advantage of the high ground and had his troops haul cannons to the top of Mount Defiance, and General St. Clair ordered Ticonderoga abandoned on July 5, 1777. Burgoyne's troops moved in the next day, with advance guards pursuing the retreating Americans. Washington heard of Burgoyne's advance and the retreat from Ticonderoga; he stated that the event was "not apprehended, nor within the compass of my reasoning". News of the abandonment of the "Impregnable Bastion" without a fight caused "the greatest surprise and alarm" throughout the colonies. General St. Clair was court-martialed in 1778, but he was cleared on all charges.

=== One last attack ===
Ticonderoga and the surrounding defenses were garrisoned by 700 British and Hessian troops under the command of Brigadier General Henry Watson Powell. Most of these forces were on Mount Independence, with only 100 each at Fort Ticonderoga and a blockhouse that they were constructing on top of Mount Defiance. George Washington sent General Benjamin Lincoln into Vermont to "divide and distract the enemy". Lincoln was aware that the British were housing American prisoners in the area, and he decided to test the British defenses. On September 13, he sent 500 men to Skenesboro, which they found the British had abandoned, and 500 each against the defenses on either side of the lake at Ticonderoga. Colonel John Brown led the troops on the west side, with instructions to release prisoners if possible and attack the fort if it seemed feasible.

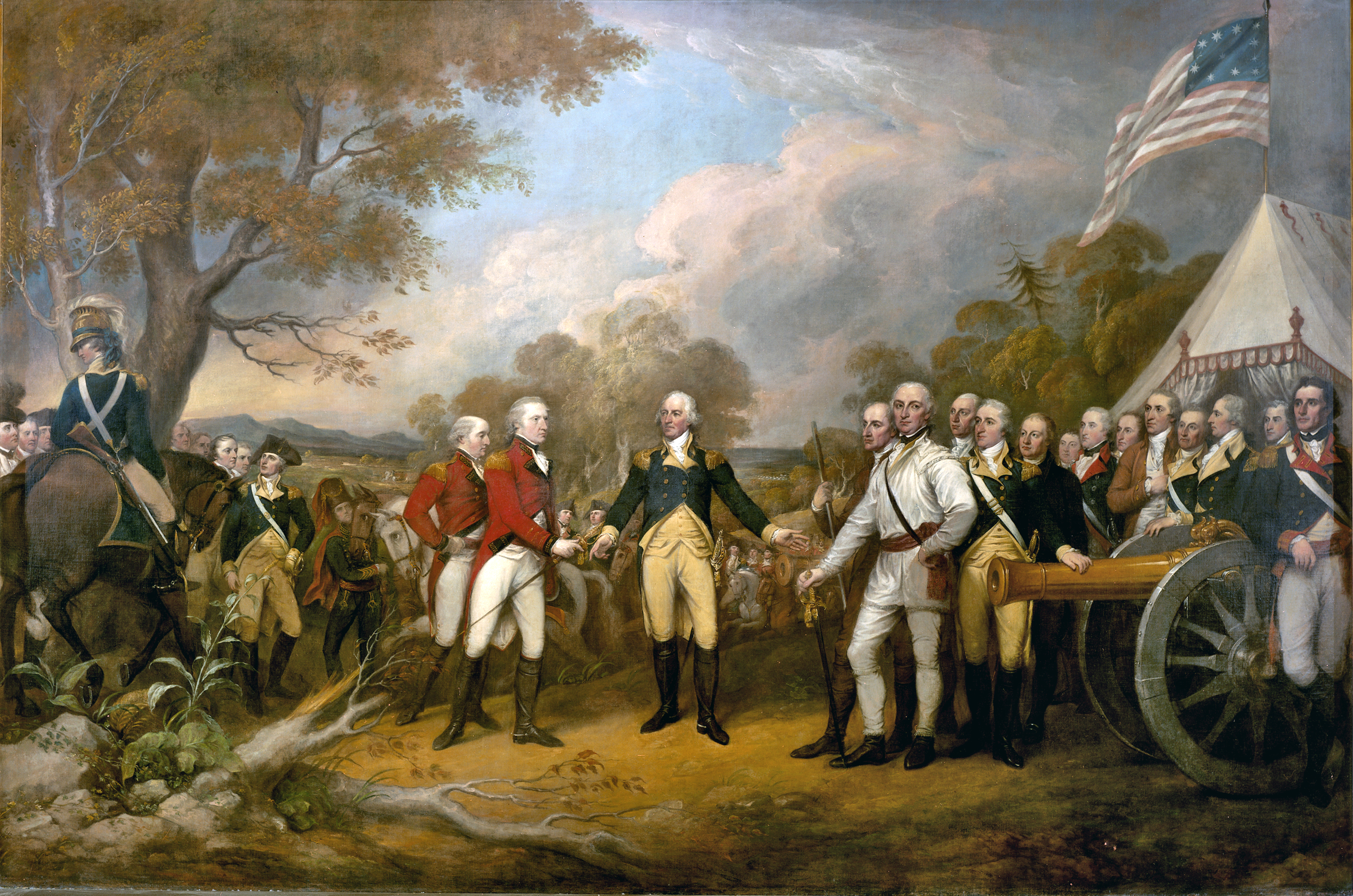
John Trumbull's depiction of the Surrender of General Burgoyne at Saratoga

Early on September 18, Brown's troops surprised a British contingent holding some prisoners near the Lake George landing, while a detachment of his troops snuck up Mount Defiance and captured most of the sleeping construction crew. Brown and his men then moved down the portage trail toward the fort, surprising more troops and releasing prisoners along the way. The fort's occupants were unaware of the action until Brown's men skirmished with British troops occupying the old French lines. At this point, Brown's men dragged two captured six-pound guns up to the lines and began firing on the fort. The men who had captured Mount Defiance began firing a twelve-pounder from that site. The column that was to attack Mount Independence was delayed, and its numerous defenders were alerted to the action at the fort below before the attack began on their position. Their musket fire and grapeshot fired from ships anchored nearby intimidated the Americans sufficiently that they never launched an assault on the defensive positions on Mount Independence. A stalemate persisted with regular exchanges of cannon fire until September 21, when 100 Hessians arrived from the Mohawk Valley to provide reinforcement to the besieged fort. Brown eventually sent a truce party to the fort to open negotiations; the party was fired on, and three of its five members were killed. Brown realized that their weaponry was insufficient to take the fort and decided to withdraw, destroying many bateaux and seizing a ship on Lake George. He then set off to annoy British positions on the lake. His action resulted in the freeing of 118 Americans and the capture of 293 British troops, while suffering fewer than 10 casualties.

=== Abandonment ===
The fort at Ticonderoga became increasingly irrelevant after Burgoyne's defeat at Saratoga. The British abandoned it and nearby Fort Crown Point in November 1777, destroying both as best they could before their withdrawal. The fort was occasionally reoccupied by British raiding parties in the following years, but it no longer held a prominent strategic role in the war. It was finally abandoned by the British for good in 1781, following their surrender at Yorktown. In the years following the war, area residents stripped the fort of usable building materials, even melting some of the cannons down for the metal.

== Tourist attraction ==
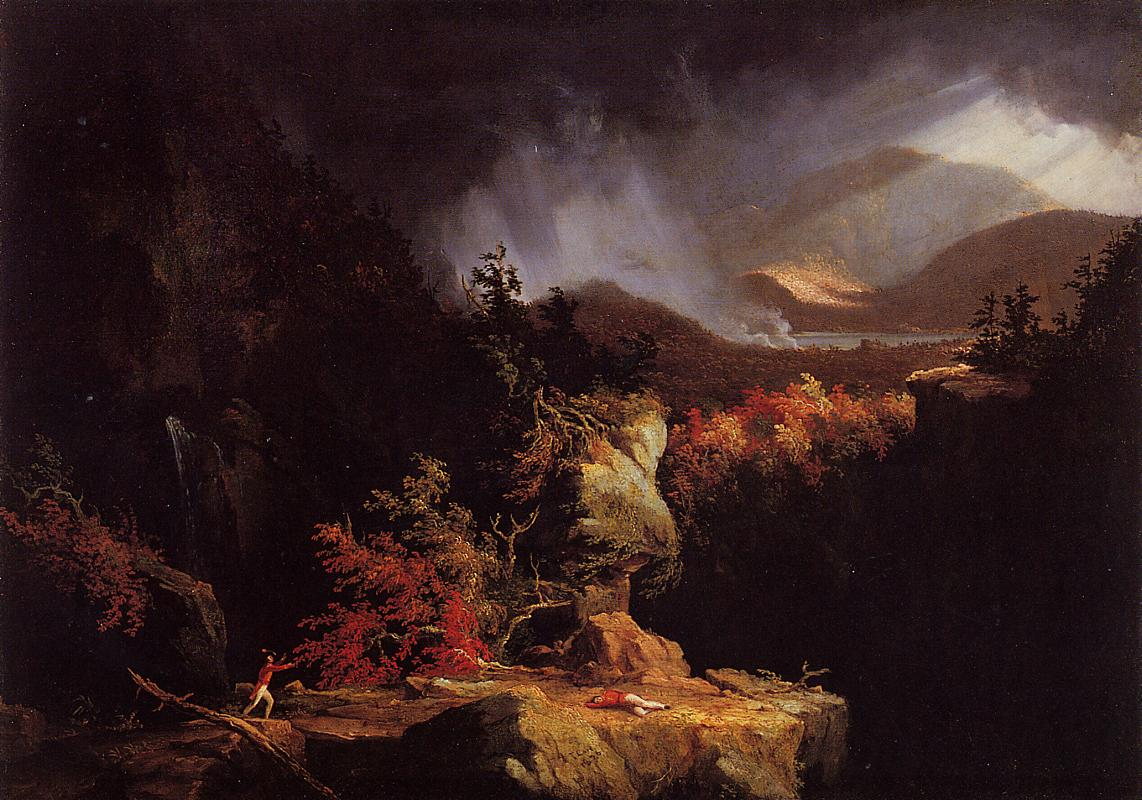
Thomas Cole's Gelyna, View near Ticonderoga

In 1785, the fort's lands became the property of the state of New York. The state donated the property to Columbia University and Union College in 1803, and the colleges sold the property to William Ferris Pell in 1820.

Pell first used the property as a summer retreat. Completion of railroads and canals connecting the area to New York City brought tourists to the area, so he converted his summer house into a hotel to serve the tourist trade. In 1848, Hudson River School artist Russell Smith painted Ruins of Fort Ticonderoga, depicting the condition of the fort.

The Pell family hired English architect Alfred Bossom to restore the fort and opened it to the public in 1909 as a historic site. The ceremonies commemorated the 300th anniversary of the discovery of Lake Champlain by European explorers and were attended by President William Howard Taft. Stephen Hyatt Pell spearheaded the restoration effort and founded the Fort Ticonderoga Association in 1931, which is now responsible for the fort. Funding for the restoration also came from Robert M. Thompson, father of Stephen Pell's wife Sarah Gibbs Thompson.

Between 1900 and 1950, the foundation acquired the historically important lands around the fort, including Mount Defiance, Mount Independence, and much of Mount Hope. The fort was rearmed with fourteen 24-pound cannons provided by the British government. These cannons had been cast in England for use during the American Revolution, but the war ended before they were shipped over.

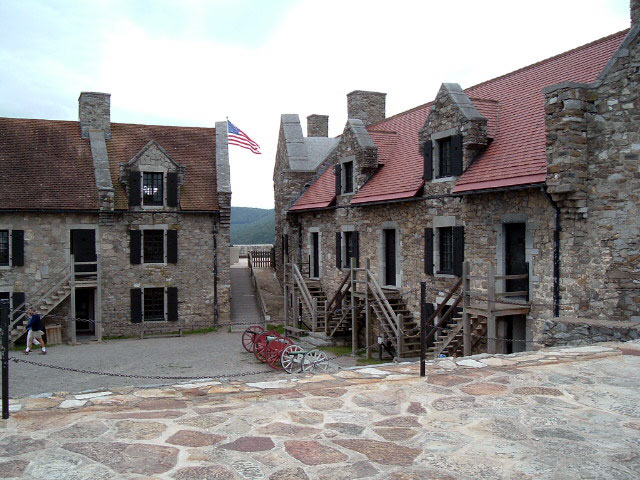
A view of the restored Fort Ticonderoga

The fort has been designated a National Historic Landmark by the Department of Interior and is now operated by the foundation as a tourist attraction, early American military museum, and research center. The fort opens annually around May 10, the anniversary of the 1775 capture, and closes in late October.

The fort has been on a watchlist of National Historic Landmarks since 1998 because of the poor condition of some of the walls and of the 19th-century pavilion constructed by William Ferris Pell. The pavilion was being restored in 2009. The powder magazine was destroyed by the French in 1759, but it was reconstructed in 2008 by Tonetti Associates Architects, based in part on the original 1755 plans. A major donor withdrew financial support in 2008, which forced the museum to consider selling Thomas Cole's Gelyna, View near Ticonderoga, one of their major art works. However, fund raising activities were able to prevent the sale.

The not-for-profit Living History Education Foundation conducts teacher programs at Fort Ticonderoga during the summer that last approximately one week. The program trains teachers how to teach Living History techniques, and to understand and interpret the importance of Fort Ticonderoga during the French and Indian War and the American Revolution. The fort conducts other seminars, symposia, and workshops throughout the year, including the annual War College of the Seven Years' War in May and the Seminar on the American Revolution in September.

The Pell family estate is located north of the fort. In 1921, Sarah Pell undertook reconstruction of the gardens. She hired Marian Cruger Coffin, one of the most famous American landscape architects of the period. In 1995, the gardens were restored and later opened for public visiting; they are known as the King's Garden.

== Memorials ==
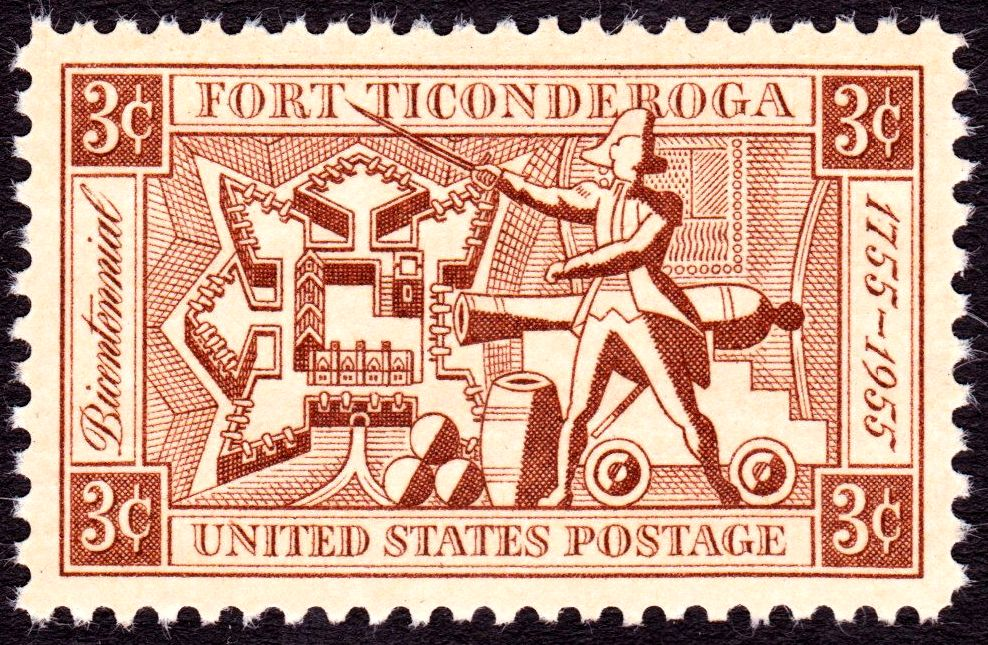
Stamp issued in 1955 marking Fort Ticonderoga's 200th anniversary

The U.S. Navy has given the name 'Ticonderoga' to five different vessels, as well as to entire classes of cruisers and aircraft carriers.

The fort was declared a National Historic Landmark in 1960. Included in the landmarked area are Mount Independence and Mount Defiance, as well as the fort. It was added to the National Register of Historic Places in 1966.

The Ticonderoga pencil, manufactured by the Dixon Ticonderoga Corporation, is named for the fort.

== See also ==
- Battle on Snowshoes (1757)
- Battle on Snowshoes (1758)
- List of French forts in North America
- Duncan Campbell (died 1758), Scottish officer of the British Army, subject of a legend about the fort
- Reit, Seymour. Guns for General Washington: A Story of the American Revolution. Clarion Books, 2001.
