= USS Trumbull (1776 row galley) =

History

United States
- Name: Trumbull
- Namesake: Jonathan Trumbull
- Builder: Continental Army soldiers, Lake Champlain at Skenesborough, New York
- Launched: 10 September 1776
- Out of service: 1777
- Fate: Captured by the British in 1777 and destroyed

General characteristics
- Type: row galley
- Displacement: 123 long tons (125 t)
- Length: 72 ft 4 in (22.05 m)
- Beam: 19 ft 7 in (5.97 m)
- Depth: 6 ft 2 in (1.88 m)
- Propulsion: oars
- Complement: 80
- Armament: 1 × 18-pounder long gun; 1 × 12-pounder long gun; 2 × 9-pounder guns; 6 × 6-pounder guns

USS Trumbull was a 10-gun row galley of the Continental Navy. She was built in 1776 at Skenesboro, New York, for service in General Benedict Arnold's fleet on Lake Champlain. She was launched on 10 September 1776 and began active service soon thereafter, Capt. Seth Warner in command.

== Design ==
Trumbull was 72 ft 4 in (22.05 m) long, 19 ft 7 in (5.97 m) wide with a draft of 6 ft 2 in (1.88 m)and a displacement of 123 long tons (125 t).

She was armed with one 18-pounder long gun, one 12-pounder long gun, two 9-pounder guns and six 6-pounder guns. Trumbull had a crew of 80 men.

== Service history ==
=== September 1776 ===
Trumbull transported a draft of reinforcements to Crown Point, New York, as General Arnold's forces sought to hurry to completion a squadron of small vessels, mostly galleys and cannon-carrying gondolas, or "gun-dalows," to oppose the expected British push down the lake toward Fort Ticonderoga. The Americans sought to retain possession of the lake, which they had controlled since early in the war, and thus engaged in a shipbuilding race with the British, who were also constructing a fleet of specially designed lake craft. Since there were no roads parallel to the lake, the British were forced to launch their invasion southward by water instead of by land. Control of Lake Champlain was thus vital to the success of British plans.

=== Battle of Valcour Island ===
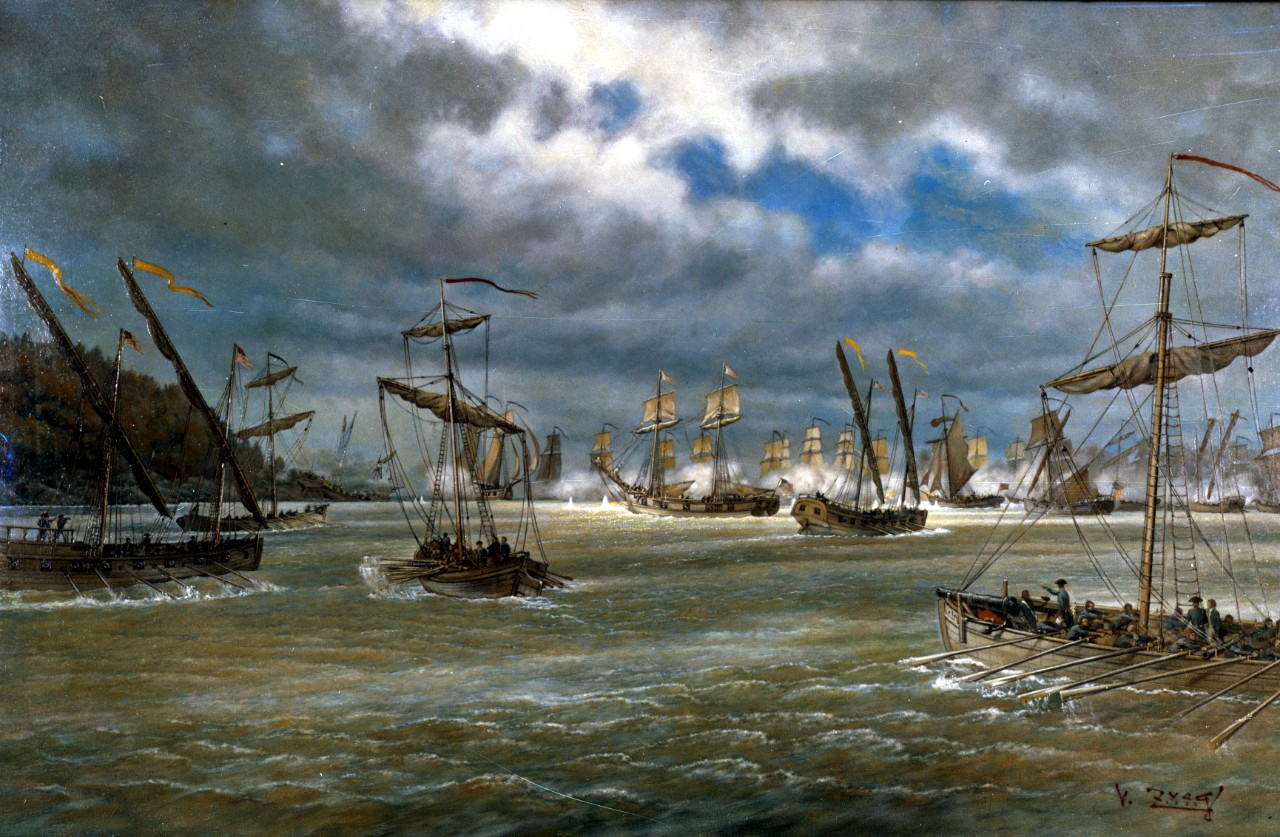
Painting of the Battle of Valcour Island

Trumbull was among Arnold's vessels that anchored in the lee of Valcour Island, south of Plattsburgh, New York, by early October, to await the British onslaught. With 25 ships, the British outnumbered the Americans by 10; and, in view of this numerical inferiority, Arnold's second-in-command urged a withdrawal. Nevertheless, despite his squadron's inferiority, Arnold bravely stood and fought.

Initially, the Americans' position favored them, as on the morning of 11 October 1776, Capt. Thomas Pringle's 25-vessel "fleet" sailed past Valcour Island and failed to discover Arnold's ships until he was south of them. Then, forced to attack from the leeward, Pringle's ships sailed up to meet Arnold's which were deployed in a crescent-shaped formation, anchored across Valcour Bay. In the resultant action, the Americans suffered heavy damage to Washington, Congress, and New York; and the loss of Royal Savage and Philadelphia. The action ended at nightfall when the British withdrew and anchored, thinking that the Americans could not escape.

Under cover of darkness and fog, the surviving ships in Arnold's squadron muffled their oars to slip past the unsuspecting British. However, before they could reach safety, a contrary wind sprang up and slowed their progress southward. The British weighed anchor, gave chase, and soon overhauled the Americans. In the ensuing battle, Arnold lost his own flagship, the galley Congress, and five other ships.

Trumbull escaped the battle, only to be captured by the British the following year, 1777, and was eventually destroyed.

=== Aftermath of the Battle of Valcour Island ===
Thus, the Battle of Valcour Island ended in a crushing tactical defeat for the Americans since it all but annihilated Arnold's flotilla and left the British in full control of Lake Champlain. However, the dominance of Arnold's little warships on the lake during the first year and one-half of the Revolutionary War had prevented British troops from invading the newly independent colonies from Canada through the Lake Champlain, Lake George, Hudson River corridor. Then, when the Royal Navy finally did manage to best Arnold's flotilla at Valcour Island in the autumn of 1776, winter was too close to permit English land forces to take advantage of British victory by a thrust down the corridor to attack Washington's army from the rear. This gave the colonies additional time to recruit, train, and arm the forces which the following year stopped a British invasion in a decisive victory at Saratoga, New York, which has been called the turning point of the American Revolution. Thus, while losing on a tactical level at Valcour, the Americans won a strategic victory which ultimately enabled them to achieve independence.

== Notes ==
Citations

== Bibliography ==
Online resources

- DANFS (16 October 2015). "Royal Savage". Dictionary of American Naval Fighting Ships. Naval History and Heritage Command. This article incorporates text from this source, which is in the public domain.

Further reading

- Nelson, James L (2006). Benedict Arnold's Navy. New York: McGraw Hill. ISBN 978-0-07-146806-0. OCLC 255396879.
