= USS Spitfire (1776 gunboat) =

1776 gundalow

History

United States
- Name: Spitfire
- Launched: 1776
- Commissioned: August 1776
- Fate: Sunk, 13 October 1776

General characteristics
- Type: Gundalow
- Length: 53 ft 4 in (16.26 m)
- Beam: 15 ft 6 in (4.72 m)
- Draft: 3 ft 10 in (1.17 m)
- Propulsion: Oar / Sail
- Speed: 4 knots under sail
- Complement: 45
- Armament: 3 x 9 pounders; 8(?) x swivel guns
- Spitfire (gunboat)
- U.S. National Register of Historic Places
- Location: Address Restricted, Lake Champlain, New York
- Area: 1.4 acres (0.57 ha)
- Built: 1776
- Architectural style: Revolutionary War Gunboat
- NRHP reference No.: 08000694
- Added to NRHP: July 24, 2008

USS Spitfire was a 3-gun gundalow of the Continental Navy that operated in 1776 on Lake Champlain. She was part of Benedict Arnold's small, hastily built fleet of ships whose purpose was to counter any British invasion forces passing through the lake from Canada. Her service life was brief; after only a few months patrolling the lake she was lost in the aftermath of the Battle of Valcour Island. The gunboat's wreck was located and documented in the 1990s by the Lake Champlain Maritime Museum.

== Prelude ==
American militia under Benedict Arnold and Ethan Allen had captured Fort Ticonderoga in 1775. Later that year these forces were involved in the invasion of Canada, but poor weather and timely arrival of British reinforcements caused the Americans to fall back to Fort Ticonderoga in May 1776. There they proceeded to build a gunboat fleet to help repel an expected British invasion.

The British, under the command of General Guy Carleton, realized that they needed to control Lake Champlain in order to conduct a successful campaign in New York. Since area roads were usually poor quality (if they existed at all), lakes and rivers were important transport routes for both sides. By controlling Lake Champlain, British forces in Canada could potentially link up with forces in New York City and crush the rebellion in America.(Nelson 2006:39ff)

== The gunboats ==
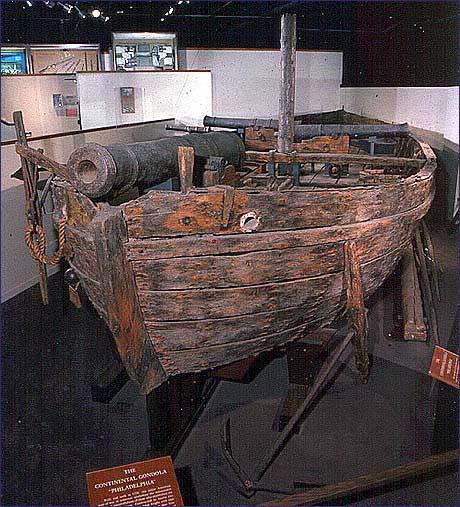
Philadelphia, a sister-ship to Spitfire.

Spitfire was one of eight gundalows built in Skenesborough (later renamed Whitehall). These gundalows, outfitted as gunboats, were built without plans though the shipwrights followed basic dimensions and instructions written by Benedict Arnold. The design of the American gunboats shows a balance between the need for rapid construction and effectiveness for their intended purpose. The gunboats all followed a common pattern. They were mostly decked over, with the middle third of the hull being open down to the bilge, thus dividing the deck into three sections. The low middle platform abaft the mast held the two broadside cannon (usually 9-pounders) and a fireplace. The guns were not opposite of each other in order to give more room to work them. The bow platform held the bow gun, usually a 9 or 12-pounder. Cannons were in short supply, so in the case of the gunboat Philadelphia the bow gun was of Swedish origin cast about 100 years earlier. The stern platform held the helmsman and officers. This platform also held two arms chests. The rail caps had sockets for oarlocks, pivot guns and stanchions for awnings. Later on, fascines were added to the rail caps for protection against small arms fire. The gunboats carried positions for 12 oars, 6 per side. The rigging consisted of a single mast with a square mainsail and a topsail. To counteract the weight of the bow gun, the stern area held stones for ballast. Due to their square sails and flat, shallow bottoms the gunboats could only sail in wind blowing from astern.(Chapelle 1949:110f; Delgado 2001:97f; Nelson 2006:235ff, 250f)

== Early service ==
Lake Champlain

As soon as the gunboats (and galleys) were launched at Skenesborough, they were sent to Fort Ticonderoga to be fitted out with sails and rigging. The warships, initially under the command of Jacobus Wynkoop, were then sent to patrol the northern part of the lake. Spitfire had joined the fleet by early August and participated in some of Wynkoop's early patrolling of the lake. Benedict Arnold was originally sent to Skenesborough to expedite the boat construction going on there, but by August 1776, he was sent to take over command of the fleet. He spent the time between August and October patrolling the lake and reconnoitering the British naval and troop buildup going on in St. Johns.(Nelson 2006:257ff)

On August 25, the fleet was sailing north to reconnoiter the British strongholds. While at anchor a violent storm blew in on August 26. All of Arnold's ships except Spitfire were able to sail out into the open lake. Spitfire was anchored closest to the lee shore, and was initially unable to set sail against the storm. Arnold ordered her to stay anchored in an attempt to ride out the storm while the rest of the fleet sailed south until they found a sheltered anchorage. Spitfire managed to survive the two-day storm and was able to rejoin the fleet at Buttonmold Bay.(Nelson 2006:264f)

By the first week in September, the American fleet was at the northern end of Lake Champlain, near the British base at St. Johns, Canada. They encountered many enemy troop encampments, and despite British efforts to lure them closer they did not try to attack St. Johns. After briefly observing enemy efforts at building shore batteries, Arnold sailed south on September 8 to Isle La Motte. There he considered making his stand against the impending British invasion, but upon hearing reports of British naval strength Arnold took the fleet further south to Valcour Island. The fleet arrived there on September 24.(Nelson 2006:269ff)

While at Valcour Island the fleet trained and waited for the British. During this time the galleys that were building at Skenesborough were completed and joined the fleet, which now consisted of three galleys, three schooners, eight gunboats and one sloop. A guard boat was sent out daily to the north end of the island to look for the British approach, which finally occurred on October 11.(Nelson 2006:290ff)

== Action at Valcour Island ==
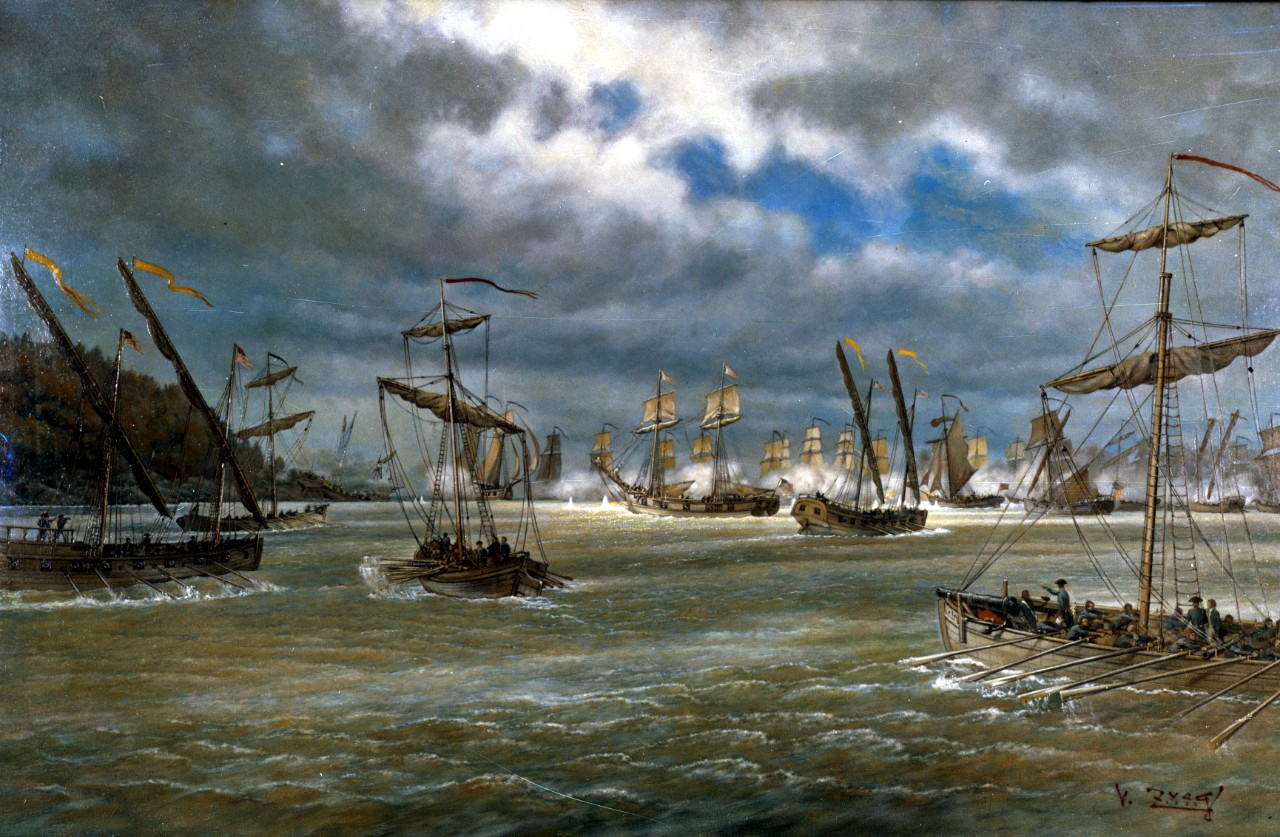
Painting of the Battle of Valcour Island

The British fleet had started making its way south on October 9. The fleet, under command of Thomas Pringle, consisted of one ship sloop, three schooners, one radeau, and over twenty gunboats. A small fleet of flat bottomed boats and bateaus carrying the British army followed. Pringle had imperfect intelligence of Arnold's whereabouts, and had sailed past Valcour Island before seeing the American fleet at anchor in the strait between the island and the mainland. However, the British fleet now had to sail against the prevailing north winds to reach the American fleet. The British gunboats, using their oars, were able to get into action quickly, with only sporadic help from the other British warships.(Nelson 2006:293ff)

The American fleet was anchored across the southern part of the strait in a crescent shaped line. Arnold had hoped that the British would initially bypass him and be forced to claw their way against the wind in order to attack. On that count he was successful, and the day was primarily a battle between the gunboats on the British side and the schooners, galleys, and gunboats on the American side. By the end of the day the Americans lost one schooner and Royal Savage. Philadelphia was so damaged that she sank that evening. All the other boats, including Spitfire, were damaged.(Nelson 2006:299ff)

Arnold decided that, due to the battered condition of his fleet and the lack of ammunition, he would withdraw south to Fort Ticonderoga. His fleet was able to slip past the British on the night of October 11–12. The following morning the British fleet, surprised to find the Americans gone, initiated a pursuit. This pursuit lasted over the next two days. In the end, only one galley, two schooners, the sloop and one gunboat survived to reach the fort.(Nelson 2006:310ff) Although the battle was a defeat for the Americans, it ultimately paved the way for an American victory the next year at Saratoga.

The Spitfire initially made its way south with the rest of Arnold's fleet towards Schuyler Island on the night of October 11–12. There the fleet halted to make repairs before resuming its flight toward Fort Ticonderoga. The Spitfire, however, succumbed to battle damage and was abandoned, sinking in the early morning hours of October 12 in deep water off Schuyler Island.

== Recent developments ==
The wreck lay undisturbed until 1997, when its intact remains were discovered during a survey by the Lake Champlain Maritime Museum. It was listed on the National Register of Historic Places in 2008.

The Lake Champlain Maritime Museum in June 2017 announced a five-phase plan to raise and preserve the Spitfire, anticipating a cost of about $44 million and a timeframe of 22 years.

== Sources ==
- Howard I. Chapelle, The History of the American Sailing Navy, W.W. Norton & Company, 1949
- James P. Delgado, Lost Warships: An Archaeological Tour of the War at Sea, Checkmark Books, 2001.
- James L. Nelson, Benedict Arnold's Navy, McGraw-Hill, 2006
- Arthur B. Cohn et al., Valcour Bay Research Project: 1999-2004 Results from the Archaeological Investigation of a Revolutionary War Battlefield in Lake Champlain, Final Report, March 2007, Lake Champlain Maritime Museum. Report available to download here.
- Lake Champlain Maritime Museum website
