= USS New Haven =

USS New Haven may refer to:

- USS New Haven (1776) was a gundalow on Lake Champlain that participated in the Battle of Valcour Island during the American Revolutionary War
- USS New Haven (CL-76) was initially laid down as a Cleveland-class light cruiser, but after the attack on Pearl Harbor she was reordered as an Independence-class light aircraft carrier and renamed USS Belleau Wood (CVL-24)
- USS New Haven (CL-109) was planned as a Fargo-class light cruiser, but her construction was canceled in August 1945
- USS New Haven (CLK-2) was a planned Norfolk-class hunter-killer cruiser, but her construction was canceled in February 1951 before she was laid down
