= USS Providence (1776 gundalow) =

History

United States
- Name: USS Providence
- Fate: Scuttled, 12 October 1776

General characteristics
- Type: Gundalow
- Length: 53 ft 4 in (16.26 m)
- Beam: 15 ft 6 in (4.72 m)
- Depth of hold: 3 ft 10 in (1.17 m)
- Complement: 45
- Armament: 1 × 12-pounder gun; 2 × 9-pounder guns; 8 × swivels

USS Providence was a 3-gun gundalow of the Continental Navy. She was built at Skenesboro, New York, on Lake Champlain by the Continental Army for Brigadier-General Benedict Arnold's fleet on Lake Champlain in 1776, during the American Revolutionary War.

Under the command of Captain Simonds, an Army officer, she participated in the engagement at Valcour Island between Arnold's fleet and a British squadron on 11 October 1776. After the battle, their ammunition nearly exhausted, the Americans retreated towards Crown Point, with the enemy in pursuit and the next morning (the 12th) Providence, being badly damaged, was sunk at Schuyler's Island by her own crew to prevent capture. This tactical defeat was a strategic victory for the Americans since Arnold's little fleet enabled the rebelling colonists to prepare for the renewed British onslaught the following summer which ended in Burgoyne's defeat at Saratoga.
