= USS New York (1776) =

History

United States
- Name: New York
- Namesake: State of New York
- Builder: Continental Army soldiers, Lake Champlain at Skenesborough, New York
- Launched: Summer 1776
- Out of service: after July 1777
- Fate: Stationed at Fort Ticonderoga when it fell in July 1777

General characteristics
- Type: Gundalow
- Displacement: 29 long tons (29 t)
- Length: 53 ft (16 m)
- Beam: 15 ft (4.6 m)
- Draft: 2 ft (0.61 m)
- Depth: 4 ft (1.2 m)
- Sail plan: lateen
- Complement: 45
- Armament: 1 × 12-pounder long gun; 2 × 9-pounder guns; 8 × swivel guns

USS New York was a 3-gun gundalow of the Continental Navy. She was built in 1776 at Skenesboro, New York. It was originally called Success prior to launch for service in General Benedict Arnold's fleet on Lake Champlain. New York may be named after New York City, because other ships in the fleet were named after cities, however, it could be named after the state of New York, because at least one or two other ships, Connecticut and Jersey, sometimes referred to as New Jersey, were named after states.

== Design ==
The exact dimensions of New York are not known, but her sister ship Philadelphia, which is preserved and on display at the National Museum of American History, in Washington, D.C., are and would probably be very close to the same. Philadelphia is 53 ft (16 m) long and 15 ft (4.6 m) wide with a draft of 2 ft (0.61 m).

She was armed with one 12-pounder long gun mounted in the bow, two 9-pounder guns, and eight swivel guns. New York had a crew of 45 men.

== Battle of Valcour Island ==
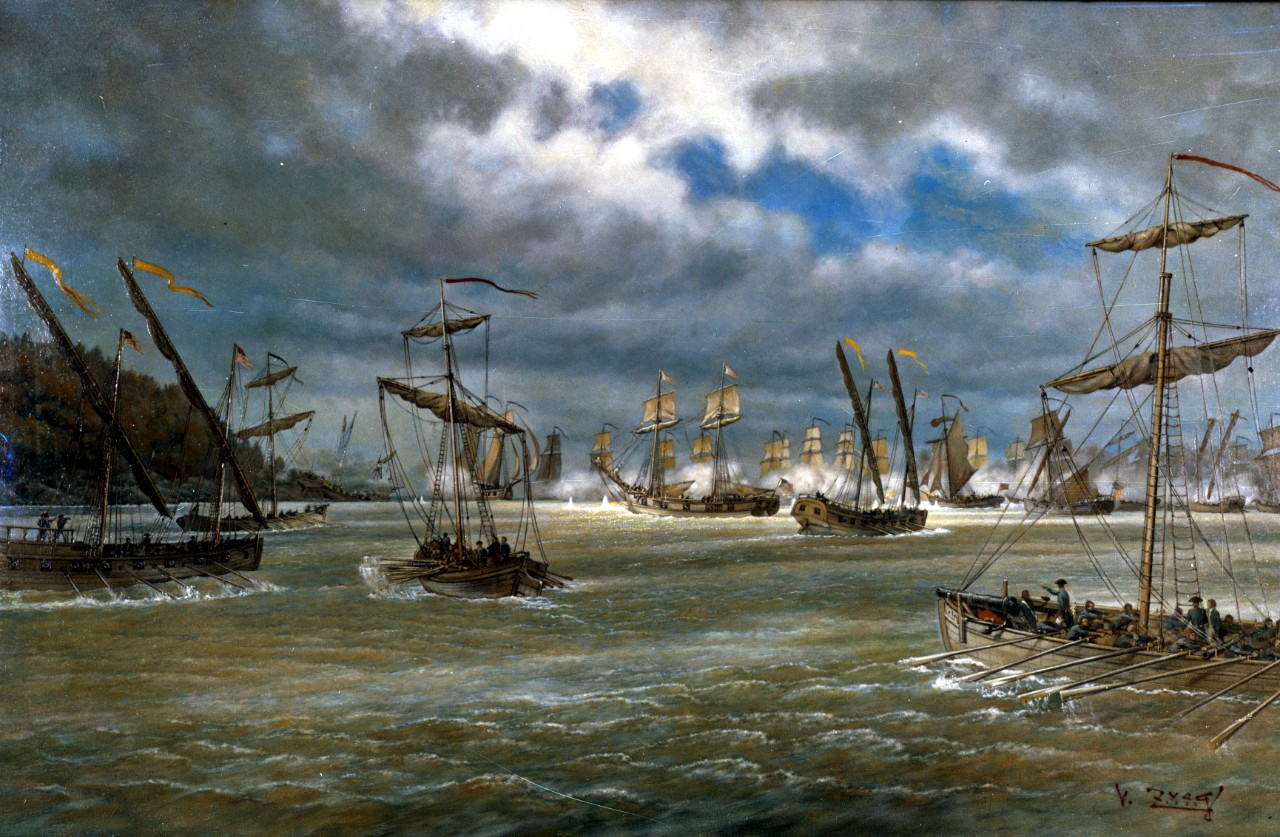
Painting of the Battle of Valcour Island

In the Battle of Valcour Island the American fleet had: eight gundalows, four row galleys, one sloops, and two schooner. The British Fleet had: one square-rigged ship, one Ketch-radeau, two schooners, one gundalow and 28 gunboats.

During the battle, it may have been captained by a Captain Lee, or may have been turned over to a Capt. Reed when Lee, probably due to illness, was unable to sail with General Arnold's little fleet as it got under way from Crown Point 24 August.

New York accompanied the flotilla up the lake, stopped at Willsborough 1 September to repair damage suffered during a severe storm and was at Isle La Motte on the 18th. On the 23rd the American ships retired into a defensive position between Valcour Island and the New York shore to await the British Capt. Thomas Pringle, RN, got his ships under way 4 October.

A week later on the morning of 11 October, the two forces met in the Battle of Valcour Island which resulted in a tactical American defeat but was a great strategic victory for the patriots' cause. Battered during the action off Valcour Island, Arnold's ships slipped through the hands of the British fleet and retired south up the Lake toward Crown Point. About noon on the 13th, the British fleet pulled within range of the Americans and opened fire. Arnold's flotilla fought defiantly for over two hours before their shattered condition forced him to run his ships ashore in a little creek about 10 miles from Crown Point and burn them. With his men, he then retired through the woods to Crown Point.

During the battle, one of the three cannons exploded, killing Lieutenant Thomas Rogers.

But the little fleet had served the American cause well. Its presence on the lake had delayed the British drive from Canada to divide the American colonies in two, while the British were building their own fleet. After the Battle of Valcour Island, winter was too close to permit them to begin the campaign. Thus New York and her sister ships had bought the Americans a year to prepare for the offensive, a year which made possible their victory at Saratoga.

New York was the only gunboat to survive the battle, along with 6 other gundalows,4 galleys, and 2 sloops. New York was later stationed at Fort Ticonderoga and was captured during the July 1777 siege.

In 1910, the stem of New York was unearthed and can be found at the Lake Champlain Maritime Museum in Vergennes, Vermont.

== Bibliography ==
Books

- Nelson, James L (2006). Benedict Arnold's Navy. New York: McGraw Hill. ISBN 978-0-07-146806-0. OCLC 255396879.

Online resources

- "From Valcour Island to Ground Zero: The First and Latest USS New York". New York City Tours by Urban Oyster. 1 November 2011. Archived from the original on 20 March 2016.
- "USS New York (LPD 21)". Official Website of the United States Navy. Archived from the original on November 11, 2009.
- DANFS (13 August 2015). "New York I (Gondola)". Dictionary of American Naval Fighting Ships. Naval History and Heritage Command. This article incorporates text from this source, which is in the public domain.
