= USS Boston (1776) =

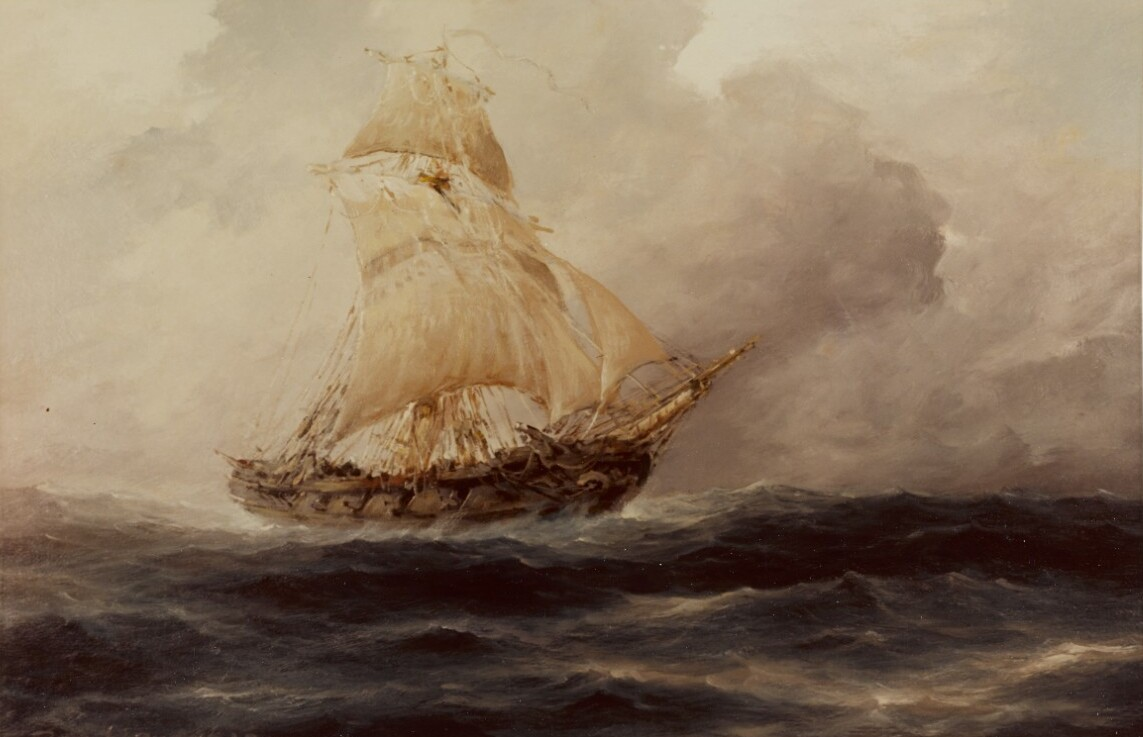
- Inaccurate illustration of Boston made in 1962

History

United States
- Namesake: Boston, Massachusetts
- Launched: 1776
- Commissioned: August 1776
- Out of service: 13 October 1776
- Fate: Burned to prevent capture

General characteristics
- Type: Gundalow
- Length: 53 ft 9 in (16.38 m)
- Propulsion: Oar
- Speed: 3 knots
- Complement: 45
- Armament: 1 × 12-pounder, 2 × 9-pounders, 8 × swivel guns

USS Boston was a 3-gun gundalow of the Continental Navy. She was built at Skenesborough (present day Whitehall), New York, in 1776, with a crew of 45 for General Benedict Arnold's short-lived Lake Champlain Fleet. She took part in the Battle of Valcour Island. She was probably commissioned sometime early in August 1776, with a Captain Sumner in command.

Early in October, she moved north with the other 14 ships of the American squadron. On the 11th, they met the vastly superior British squadron off Valcour Island in the northern reaches of the lake. The British discovered them in a shallow bay south of the island and moved in to begin a bombardment. By 11:00 that morning, the schooner Carleton and some gunboats had rowed to within gun range to open the shelling. The wind prevented the larger British vessels from getting into the fray.

By 5:00 that afternoon when the British withdrew for the night, two of the larger American vessels were severely damaged and a third had to be run aground, burned, and abandoned. That night, Boston joined the remainder of the Americans in stealing away toward Crown Point to the south. The British discovered their flight on the morning of the 12th and struck out in pursuit. They did not finally catch the Americans until the morning of the 13th at a point just below Split Rock nearly halfway to their goal. A two-hour running fight ensued. Severely pressed, General Arnold took Congress and four of the gondolas into Buttonmold Bay on the eastern coast of the lake. There he unloaded small arms and destroyed the vessels by fire to prevent their capture. Boston was destroyed there on 13 October 1776.
