= Valcour Bay =

- U.S. National Register of Historic Places
- U.S. National Historic Landmark
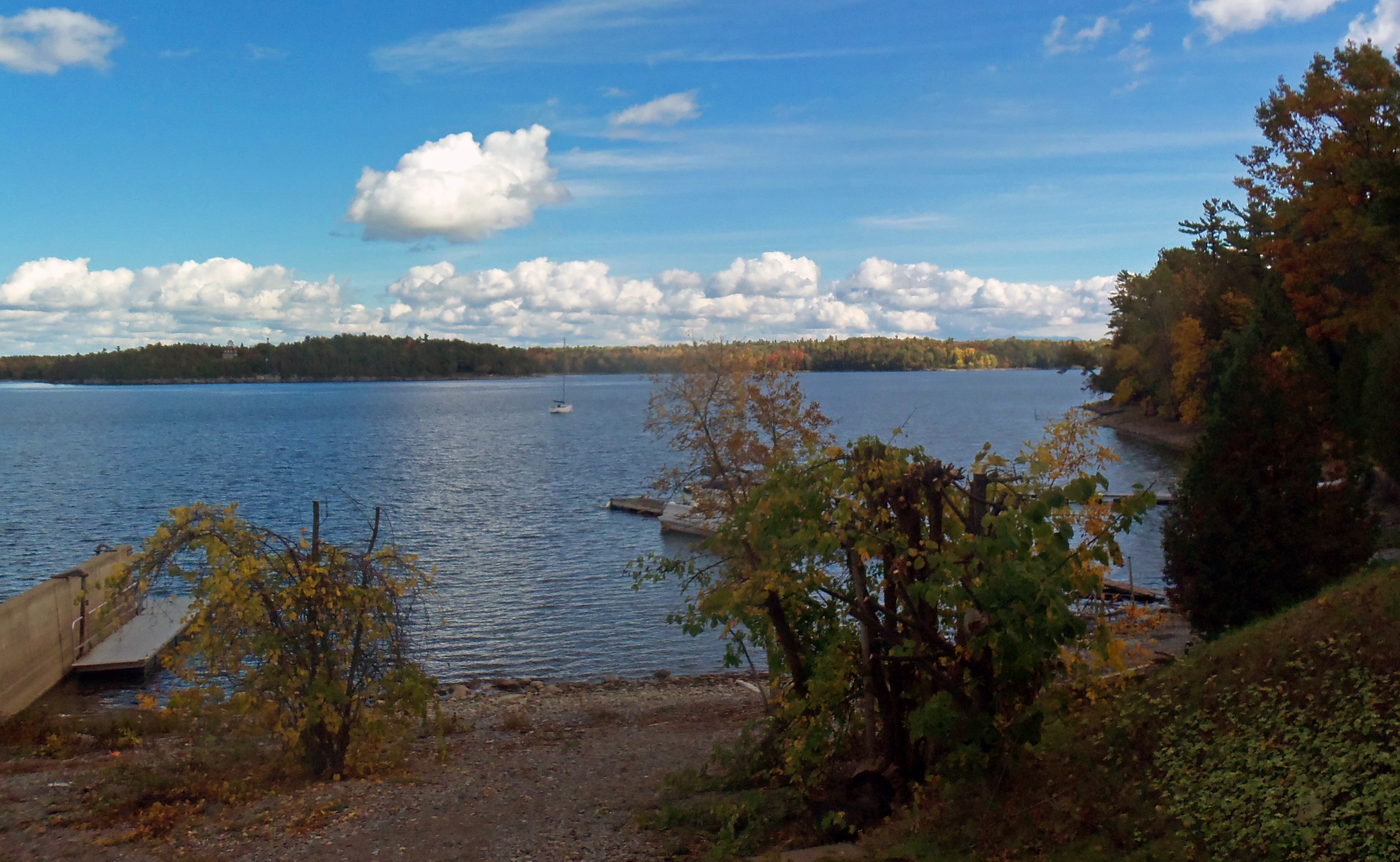
- Bay in 2012

- Location within New York Location within the United States
- Location: Lake Champlain; Clinton County, New York
- Nearest city: Plattsburgh, NY
- Coordinates: 44°37′4″N 73°25′57″W
- Area: 1,200 acres (490 ha)
- NRHP reference No.: 66000508

Significant dates
- Added to NRHP: October 15, 1966
- Designated NHL: January 1, 1961

Valcour Bay is actually a strait or sound, located between Valcour Island and the west side of Lake Champlain, four miles south of Plattsburgh, New York. It was the site of the Battle of Valcour Island during the American Revolutionary War. It was declared a National Historic Landmark in 1961 because of this association. Valcour Bay is located in the Towns of Peru and Plattsburgh, both in Clinton County, New York.

== Description ==
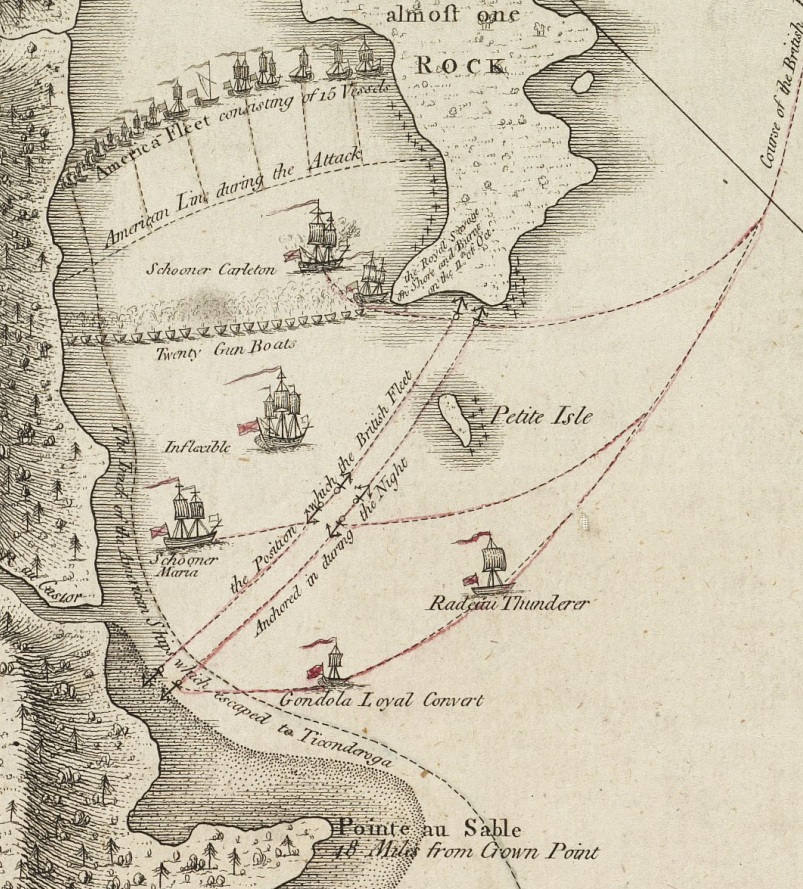
A 1776 map showing the Battle of Valcour Bay

Valcour Island, located in Lake Champlain, is roughly rectangular in shape, extending 2 miles (3.2 km) from its northern to southern tips. It is located about 0.5 miles (0.80 km) east of the New York state shoreline to the west. Valcour Bay is the body of water between the island and the mainland, with the landmarked area of the bay consisting of about 1,200 acres (490 ha). Both the island and the mainland shore have seen relatively little development since the area was of military importance in 1776.

In 1776, Benedict Arnold was placed in command of a Continental Navy fleet on the lake, composed mostly of small gundalows armed with three small cannons. After training with the fleet during the summer months, Arnold selected Valcour Bay as the place to meet the British Royal Navy fleet, which had taken longer to prepare for action. The bay's location required the British fleet to sail with the wind south past the island, and then turn to come upwind toward Arnold's fleet, which he arrayed in a crescent formation. Meeting in battle on October 11, the two fleets engaged in battle in which both sides suffered some damage, but left the American fleet in a precarious position, with little ammunition and separated from its base by the British presence. The Americans were able to escape that night, but most of their fleet was abandoned, sunk, or captured over the next two days.

The USS Philadelphia, which was sunk during the battle, was raised in 1935 and is on display at the Smithsonian Institution in Washington, D.C. It was also declared a National Historic Landmark in 1961. The wrecked remains of the American schooner Royal Savage, abandoned and burned during the battle at the southern tip of Valcour Island were raised in 1934.

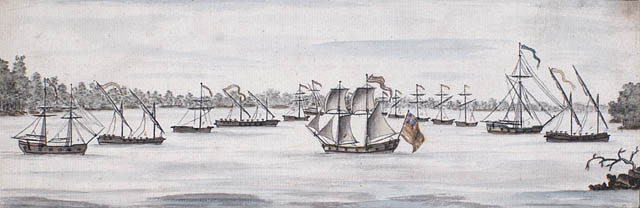
Contemporary watercolor drawing of the American line of battle by Charles Randle. Drawing is titled as follows: New England Armed Vessels in Valcure Bay, Lake Champlain [including Royal Savage, Revenge, Lee, Trumble, Washington, Congress, Philadelphia, New York, Jersey, Connecticut, Providence, New Haven, Spitfire, Boston, and Liberty] commanded by Benedict Arnold.

== See also ==
- List of National Historic Landmarks in New York
- National Register of Historic Places listings in Clinton County, New York
