= USS Washington (1776 lateen-rigged galley) =

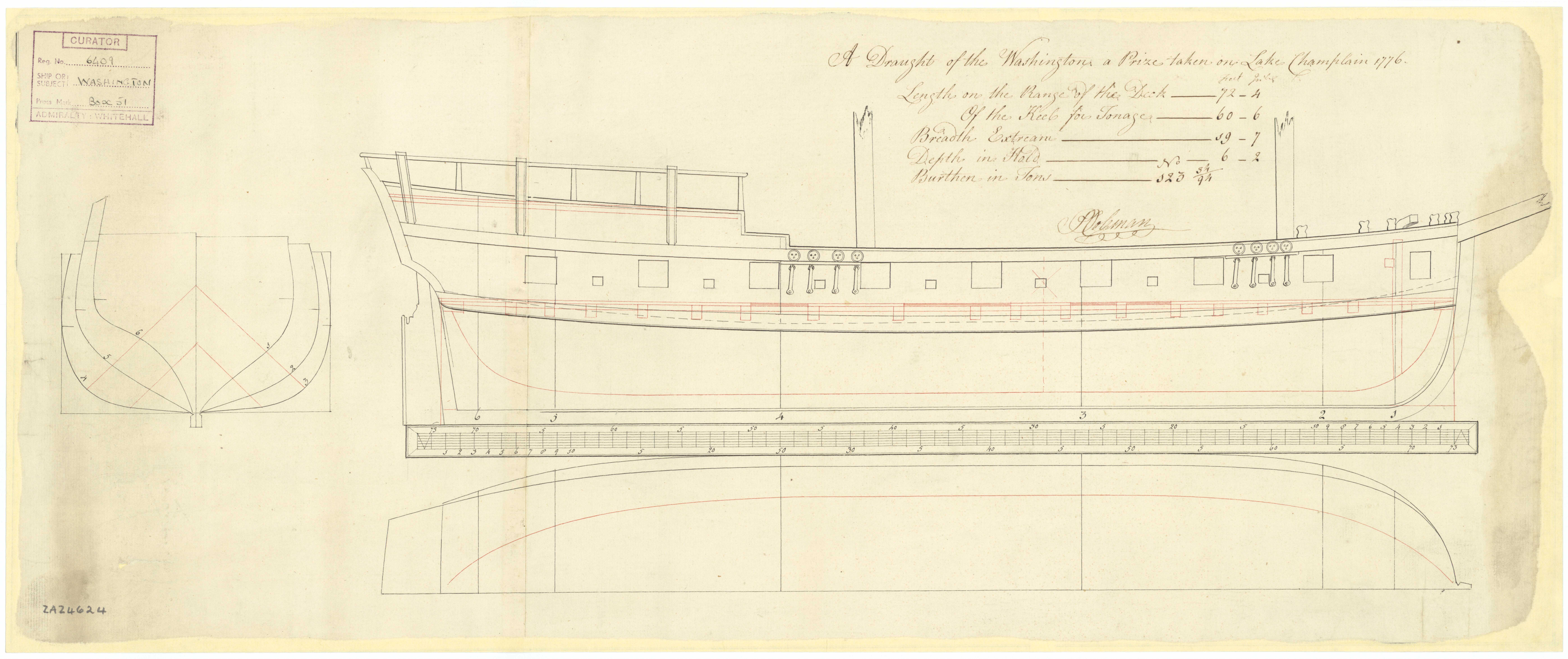
- Ship plan of Washington

History

United States
- Name: Washington
- Namesake: George Washington
- Builder: Continental Army soldiers, Lake Champlain at Skenesborough, New York
- Completed: Fall 1776
- In service: October 1776
- Out of service: October 1776
- Captured: by the British, 13 October 1776 retained by the British under the same name
- Fate: unknown

General characteristics
- Type: galley
- Displacement: 123 long tons (125 t)
- Length: 72 ft 4 in (22.05 m)
- Beam: 19 ft 7 in (5.97 m)
- Depth: 6 ft 2 in (1.88 m)
- Sail plan: lateen-rigged, two-masted
- Complement: 80
- Armament: 2 × 18-pounder long guns; 2 × 12-pounder long guns; 2 × 9-pounder guns; 4 × 4-pounder guns; 1 × 2-pounder gun; 8 × swivel guns

USS Washington was an 11-gun row galley of the Continental Navy during the American Revolutionary War. Washington was capable of propulsion by sail or by the rowing of oarsmen. During a battle with British warships, Washington "struck her colors" and was captured by the British.

== Built on Lake Champlain ==
The third ship to be named Washington, a lateen-rigged, two-masted galley, was built on Lake Champlain at Skenesboro, New York, in the autumn of 1776. On 6 October 1776, the galley joined the small fleet established and commanded by Brigadier General Benedict Arnold.

=== Design ===
Washington was 72 ft 4 in (22.05 m) long, 19 ft 7 in (5.97 m) wide with a draft of 6 ft 2 in (1.88 m)and a displacement of 123 long tons (125 t).

She was armed with two 18-pounder long gun, two 12-pounder long gun, two 9-pounder guns, four 6-pounder guns, one 2-pounder gun, and eight swivel guns. Trumbull had a crew of 80 men.

== Service history ==
=== Battle of Valcour Island ===
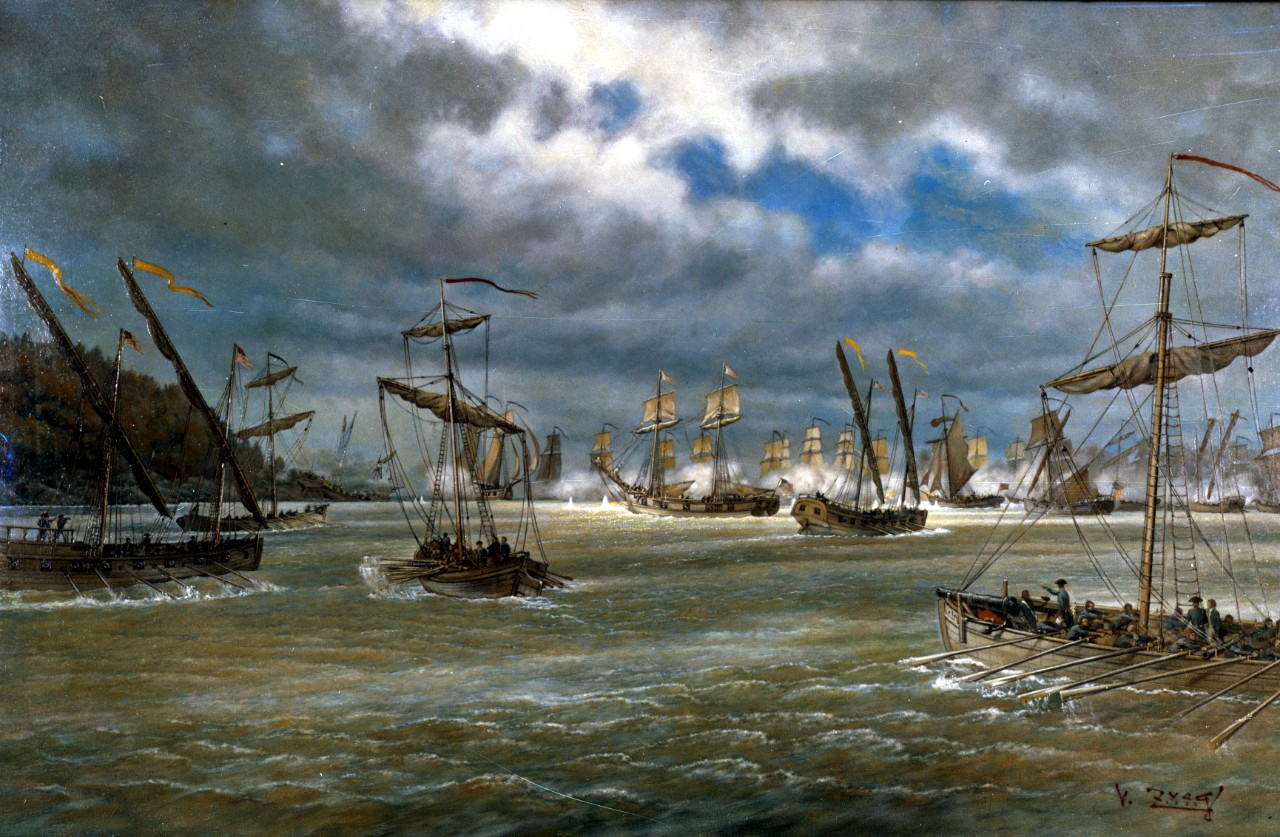
Painting of the Battle of Valcour Island

Washington, commanded by Brigadier General David Waterbury, Arnold's second in command—was among Arnold's ships that anchored in the lee of Valcour Island to await the expected English move.

When that lakeward push began, Capt. Thomas Pringle, of the Royal Navy, led a 25-ship fleet past Valcour Island on 11 October. Pringle sighted the American fleet after he had passed it and attacked from leeward. In the ensuing action, Washington suffered the heaviest damage of any ship in Arnold's fleet; Waterbury, her commander, subsequently reported that she was

... so torn to pieces that it was almost impossible to keep her above water.

Arnold regrouped his shattered fleet and slipped past the British on 12 October with muffled oars, the Americans slipping noiselessly past Pringle's fleet in a desperate attempt at escape. However, after a long chase, the British caught the retreating Continental force the following day, on 13 October, at Split Rock near Crown Point.

==== After the battle ====
Arnold managed to beach and destroy four of the galleys and his own flagship, Congress, while most of the remaining ships escaped upriver. Only Washington, at the rear of the van, was captured by the enemy; she struck her colors, as Arnold reported later, " ... after receiving a few broadsides."

=== Final disposition ===
Washington was eventually taken into British service, apparently retaining her name, and was re-rigged as a brig. Her subsequent fate, however, is unrecorded.

== Bibliography ==
Online resources

- DANFS (26 October 2015). "Washington III (Galley)". Dictionary of American Naval Fighting Ships. Naval History and Heritage Command. This article incorporates text from this source, which is in the public domain.
- Priolo, Gary P. (15 July 2016). "Washington (III)". NavSource.
