= David Hawley =

American Continental Navy officer

- Born: 1741; Stratford, Connecticut, British America
- Died: 1807 (aged 65–66); Stratfield, Connecticut, U.S.
- Military career
- Allegiance: United States
- Branch: Continental Navy
- Service years: 1776–1784
- Rank: Captain
- Commands: Oliver Cromwell; USS Royal Savage; USS Schuyler; USS Guilford
- Conflicts: American Revolutionary War; Battle of Valcour Island

David Hawley (1741–1807) was a captain in the Continental Navy and a privateer during the American Revolutionary War. He commanded Royal Savage in the 1776 Battle of Valcour Island, which is generally regarded as one of the first naval battles of the American Revolutionary War, and one of the first fought by the United States Navy.

== Early life and education ==
Hawley is born into a Connecticut seafaring family in 1741. His parents were James and Eunice Hawley who lived in the Stratfield section of Stratford, Connecticut now Bridgeport. Hawley's grandfather was Gideon, his great-grandfather was Ephraim and his great-great-grandfather was Joseph Hawley, a shipbuilder and the first of the name in America.

== Career ==
=== Commission ===
Hawley was appointed a lieutenant on July 11, 1776, to serve on the state man of war Oliver Cromwell. At a meeting with the Governor of Connecticut and Council of Safety on August 16, 1776, it was voted to draw an order in favor of Captain David Hawley for 180 pounds to enable Hawley to raise a crew of seamen for the naval service of the United States on the Lakes to the northward, to which he was appointed Captain.

=== Battle of Valcour Island ===
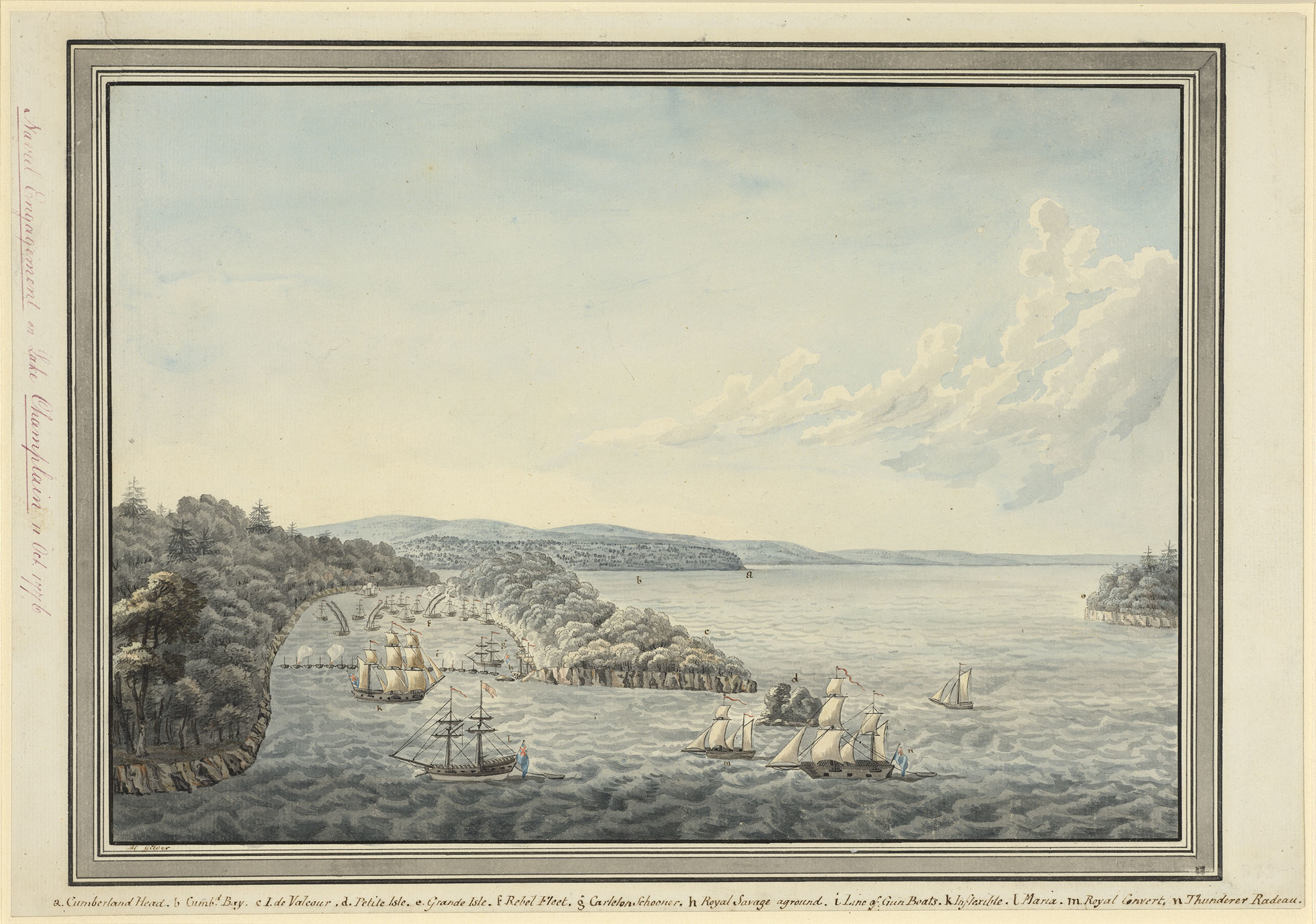
Contemporary watercolor showing Royal Savage running aground while British ships fire on her

He served under Benedict Arnold at the Battle of Valcour Island on Lake Champlain on October 11, 1776. The battle is generally regarded as one of the first naval battles of the American Revolutionary War, and one of the first fought by the United States Navy. Hawley commanded the two-masted schooner USS Royal Savage with a crew of 50 men. His cousin Ephraim Hawley (1746–1777) served as his lieutenant and his young nephew Samuel Hawley was also a seaman. The ship ran aground during the battle and was burned by the crew to prevent it from falling into British hands. The Royal Savage had been Arnold's flagship until he went aboard the USS Congress. All of Arnold's personal belongings were destroyed when the Royal Savage was burned. This naval battle delayed for one year the British attempts to cut the colonies in half.

=== Revolutionary War service ===
He was taken prisoner several times, and after being taken with the State sloop USS Schuyler in 1777, he was again exchanged, and continued his service as a privateer in Long Island Sound, bringing several prizes into Black Rock Harbor. He commanded the USS Guilford, until she fell prey to the British in New Haven harbor in July 1779, when he escaped capture and fitted out a flotilla of armed boats by warrant authority, before being commissioned.

==== Daring raid ====
In November 1779 he commanded a voluntary force of 20 men from Stratford, Connecticut and the vicinity, crossed the Sound in a daring raid and brought back from Long Island, Thomas Jones, Esq, of Suffolk County, one of the Judges of the Ministerial Supreme Court of the Crown, and delivered him up as a hostage to exchange for General Gold Selleck Silliman who had been taken prisoner earlier that year. The daring raid and subsequent prisoner exchange were made into the film Mary Silliman's War produced by Heritage Films, under the auspices of The Institute for Early American History in Colonial Williamsburg, Virginia. It is based on the biography by Richard and Joy Day Buel, The Way of Duty (Norton, 1984).

==== Protecting the Connecticut shore ====
The next spring, on April 20, 1780, he went from Fairfield, Connecticut with three armed boats under his command to Blue Point, Long Island and captured eleven British and Tory vessels, all of which he either destroyed or ransomed, except four which he brought back to Fairfield and libeled. One of the latter was richly laden with West India goods. On April 6, 1780, in company with Capt. Ebenezer Jones, he took a Tory sloop commanded by Jared Bell. On October 15, 1780, he partook in the capture of the sloop Dorset. Under his last commission he was especially active in the Sound and performed important naval service in the prevention of illicit trade, seizing and libeling many boats and cargoes in the Fairfield Court. During his several exploits, first and last Captain Hawley is credited with the capture of over 20 sail of enemy craft during the American War for Independence.

== Personal life ==
It is believed by some that Captain Hawley built the first brick house within the city limits of Bridgeport, Connecticut from bricks that may have been supplied by Nero Hawley. The home was located at the corner of Water and Gilbert Streets and was used, after Hawley's death as a saddle factory by Seth B. Jones and was the arena of great theological discussions among the workmen, especially; Joshua Lord, William Wright, Edwin B. Gregory and Alexander S. Gordon.
