= HMS Maria (1776) =

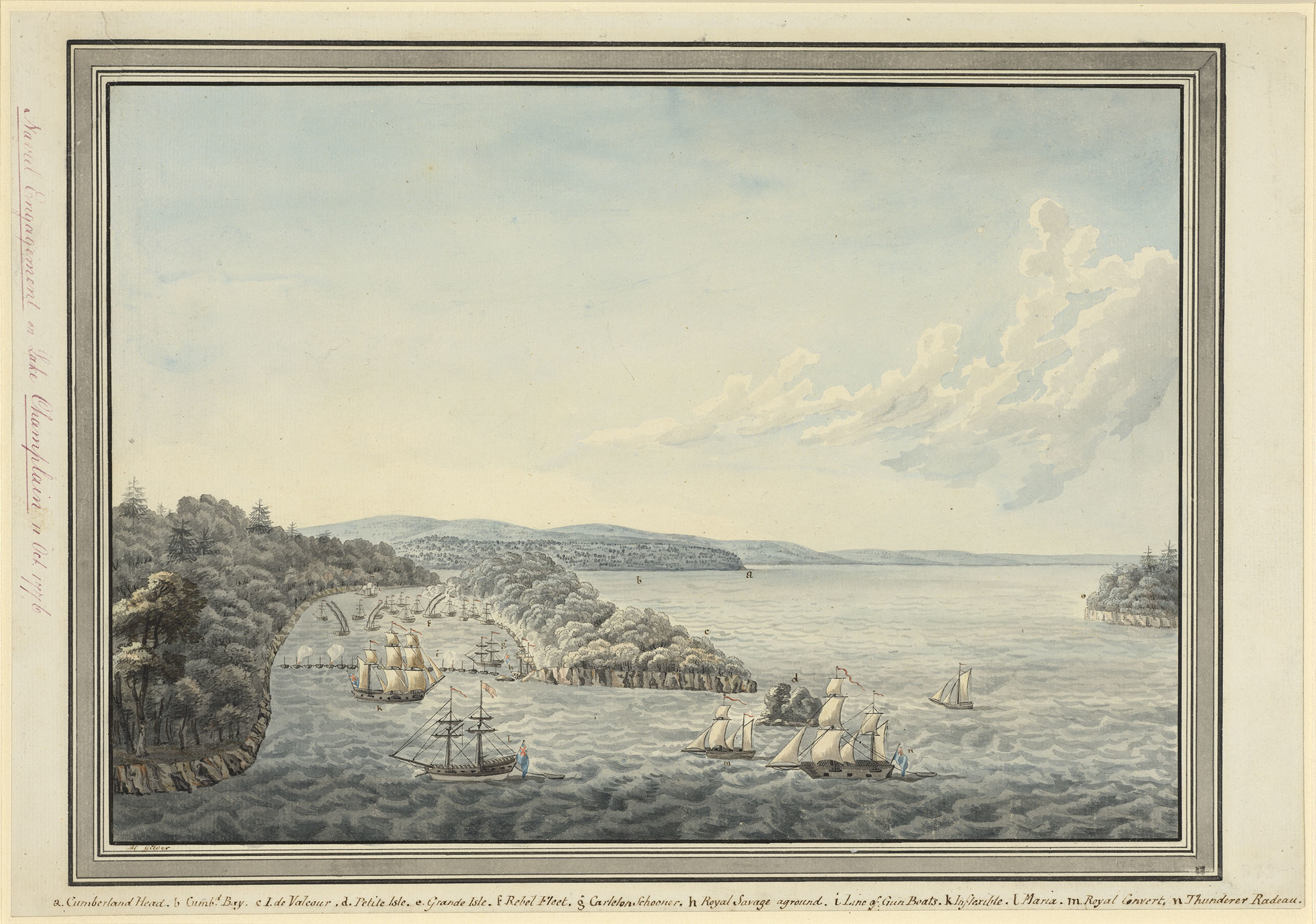
- The action shortly after Royal Savage ran aground; Maria is the vessel in the left foreground

History

Great Britain
- Name: HMS Maria
- Acquired: 1776 by purchase of a prize
- Fate: Unknown

General characteristics
- Tons burthen: 128 (bm)
- Sail plan: Schooner
- Complement: 40
- Armament: 14 × 6-pounder guns

HMS Maria was a 14-gun schooner that the Americans captured in 1775 and that the British recaptured on 7 May 1776 at Quebec City and took into the Royal Navy.

Capture: On 3 May 1776 Isis, Surprise, and Martin sailed up the St Lawrence River to the relief of Quebec. Surprise and Martin sailed ahead to "annoy" the retreating American troops. On their way on 7 May they captured an American privateer schooner armed with four 6-pounder and six 3-pounder guns, and on 17 May they recovered Gaspée. The privateer was Maria.

The British dismantled her and took her overland to Lake Champlain where they reassembled her. She also received six guns from HMS Lizard. She was one of three "reconstructions", the other two being Inflexible and Carleton.

Under the command of Lieutenant John Starke, Maria served on Lake Champlain in 1776 in the flotilla of Captain Thomas Pringle. She was at the battle of Valcour Island in 1776 where she served as the flagship for Colonel Guy Carleton, Lieutenant-Governor of the province of Quebec. Contrary winds prevented Maria from participating in the battle though.

Maria's subsequent disposition is unknown as of November 2022.
