= USS Success =

USS Success is a name used more than once by the United States Navy:

- USS Success (1776) was a gundalow built in 1776 at Skenesboro, New York, for service in General Benedict Arnold's fleet on Lake Champlain. She was renamed New York.
- USS Success (AM-310) was laid down on 18 February 1944 by Associated Shipbuilders, Seattle, Washington.
