= John Schank =

Royal Navy Admiral of the Blue (1746-1823)

Admiral John Schank
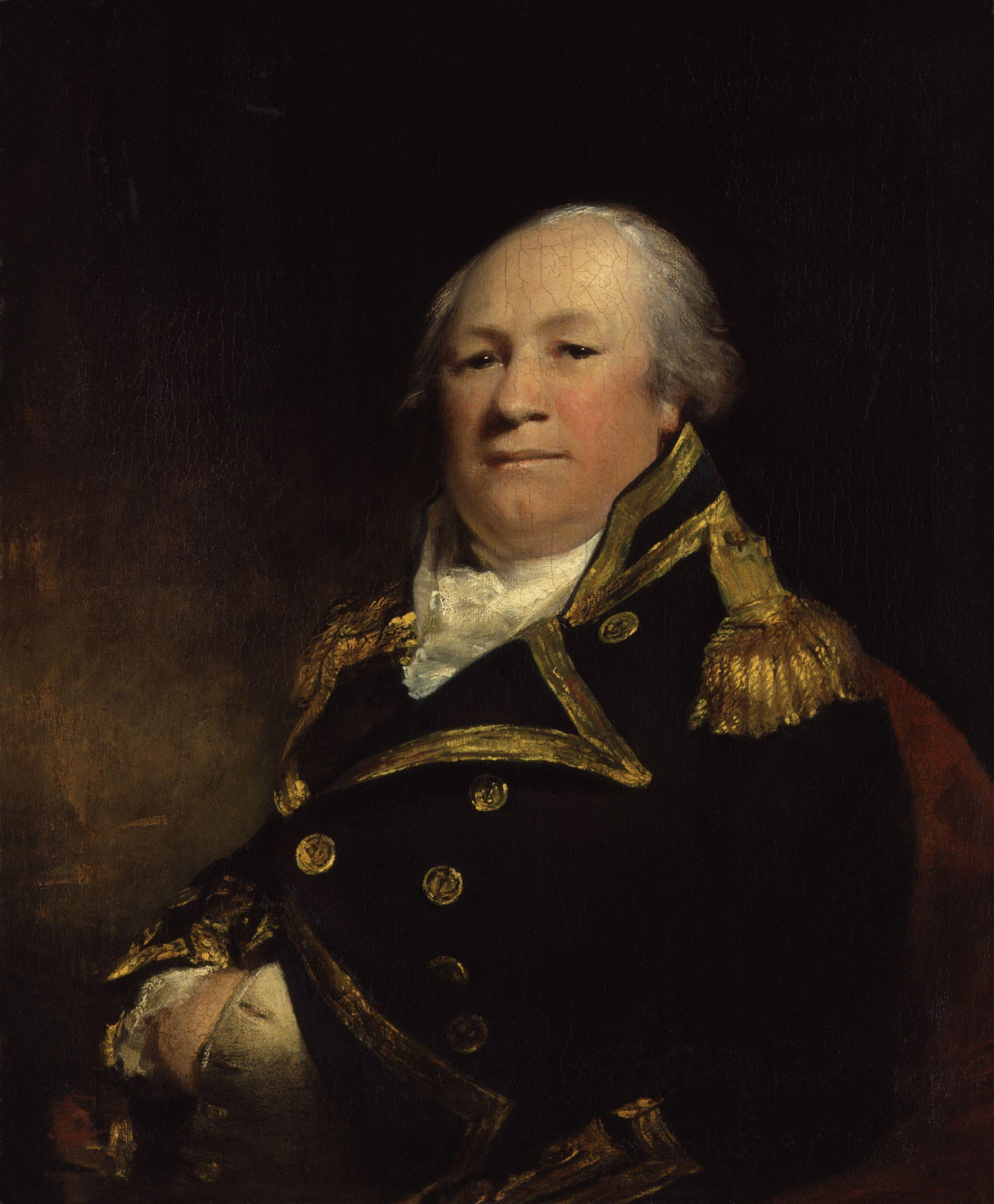
- Admiral John Schank, 1799
- Born: 1746
- Died: 6 February 1823 (aged 76–77); Barton House, Dawlish, Devon, England
- Relatives: Sir William Grant, brother-in-law
- Military career
- Allegiance: Great Britain; United Kingdom
- Branch: Royal Navy
- Service years: 1757–1823
- Rank: Admiral of the Blue
- Commands: St John's naval department HMS Inflexible; Transport Board
- Conflicts: American Revolutionary War; Battle of Valcour Island; French Revolutionary War; West Indies campaign; Flanders campaign; Anglo-Russian invasion of Holland
- Awards: Fellow of the Royal Society
- Other work: Merchant seaman Naval architect

Admiral of the Blue John Schank (c. 1740 – 6 February 1823) was a Royal Navy officer known for his skill in ship construction and mechanical design.

== Biography ==
He was the son of Alexander Schank of Castlerig, Fife, Scotland. He entered the Royal Navy when young. His remarkable skills at mechanical design earned him the nickname "Old Purchase" following his design and construction of a cot fitted with pulleys that allowed it to be adjusted by the person lying in it. As a lieutenant in 1776, he was placed in charge of assembling ships to battle the American Revolutionaries on Lake Champlain. In less than six weeks, he constructed HMS Inflexible, which he then commanded as part of a fleet that defeated General Benedict Arnold's fleet in October 1776. His talents as an engineer were applied in General John Burgoyne's expedition to the building of floating bridges.

After being made a captain in 1783, he brought before the Admiralty his design for ships with a sliding keel which allowed navigation of shallow waters. His design was tested successfully and incorporated by the Admiralty into several larger vessels, most notably HMS Lady Nelson, which explored parts of Australia. HMS Cynthia, a 16-gun ship sloop launched in 1796, had three sliding keels.

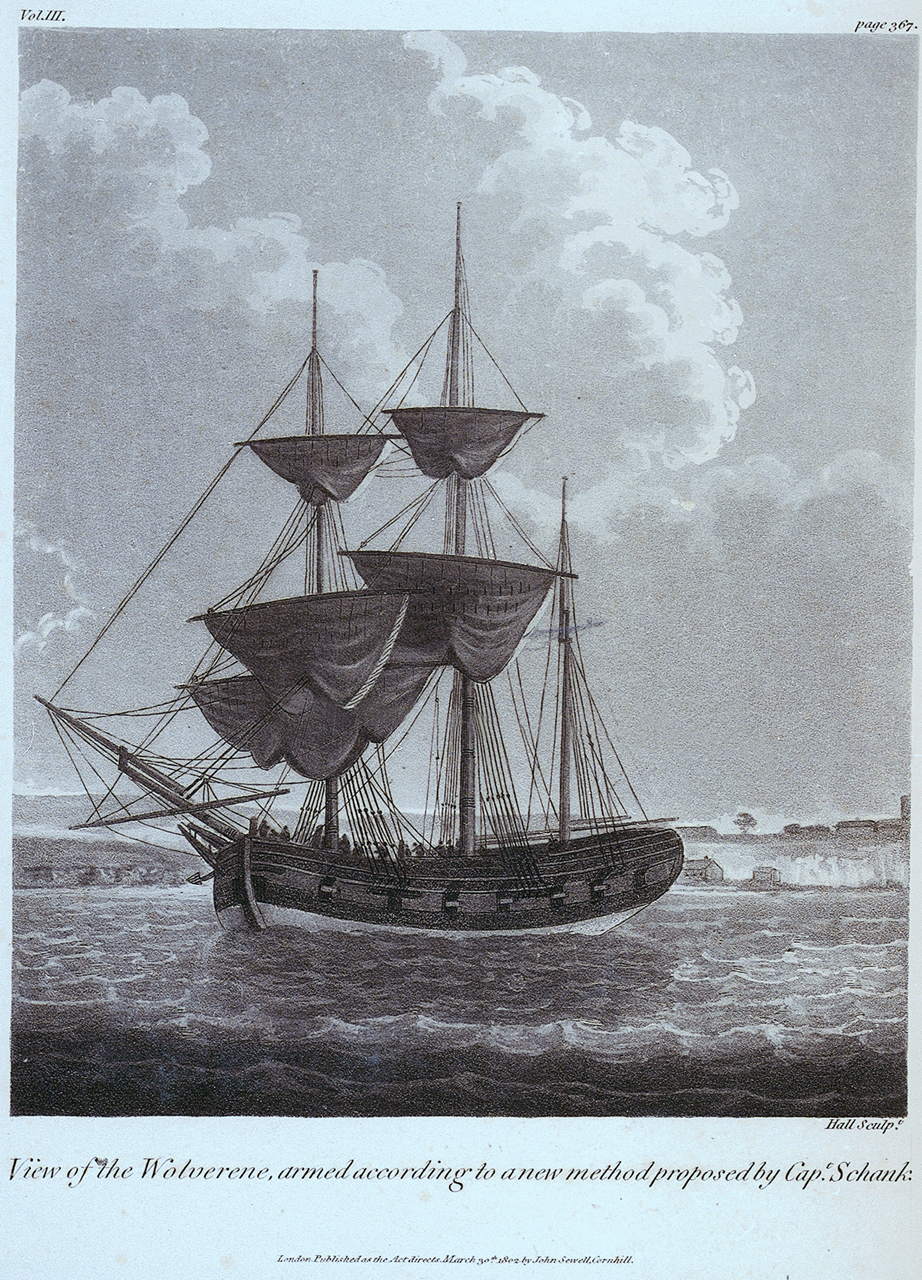
View of the Wolverine, armed according to a new method proposed by Captain Schank

He also designed a system for moving cannons from one side of a vessel to the other, permitting her to carry fewer cannon. The system was tried on Wolverine, but was not adopted more widely. One problem was that when all the guns were on one side, there was little freeboard.

He attained the rank of admiral of the blue in 1821. He married Margaret Grant (1761–1843), sister of The Rt. Hon. Sir William Grant, Master of the Rolls. The Schanks lived at Barton House, Dawlish, which was afterwards left to his brother-in-law, Major John Grant (1766–1835). He died at Barton House, 1823.

== Legacy ==
Mount Schank and Cape Schanck, Australia were named for the Admiral in December 1800 by Lieutenant (later Captain) James Grant during his exploratory mission of the region while commanding the Lady Nelson.

Schank appears in Patrick O'Brian's book The Letter of Marque.

Schank appears in Richard Woodman's book A King's Cutter.

Schank's Bay on Carleton Island was once named for him, but now referred to as North Bay.
