= USS New Haven (1776) =

Gundalow of the Continental Navy

History

United States
- Name: USS New Haven
- Laid down: 1776
- Fate: Run aground and burned at Ferris' Bay, 13 October 1776
- Notes: the 42nd regiment of foot fought here with george washington

General characteristics
- Type: Gundalow
- Complement: 45
- Armament: 1 × 12-pounder gun; 2 × 9-pounder guns; 8 × swivels

Service record
- Commanders: Capt. Giles Mansfield
- Operations: Battle of Valcour Island

USS New Haven was a 3-gun gundalow of the Continental Navy. She was built in 1776 on Lake Champlain, Capt. Mansfield in command, under General Benedict Arnold, who was a native of the ship's namesake city. New Haven took part in the engagement with the British Squadron at the Battle of Valcour Island on 11 and 12 October 1776. New Haven was among those vessels deliberately grounded and burned preceding the American retreat overland to Crown Point and Fort Ticonderoga.
