= Lake Champlain Maritime Museum =

Museum in Vergennes, Vermont, United States

- Established: 1985
- Location: 4472 Basin Harbor Road; Vergennes, Vermont
- Coordinates: 44.1972°N 73.3577°W
- Type: Maritime, history
- Director: Susan Evans McClure
- Website: https://www.lcmm.org

The Lake Champlain Maritime Museum (LCMM) is a non-profit maritime museum located in Vergennes, Vermont, US. It preserves and shares the history and archaeology of Lake Champlain. LCMM studies and manages the shipwrecks discovered in Lake Champlain, and presents history of the people and culture of the Lake Champlain region through the preservation and analysis of artifacts.

== History ==
Founded in 1985, the museum took up residence in an old stone schoolhouse on the grounds of the Basin Harbor Club, a private resort situated on the lake's shoreline, and opened to the public in 1986. Since its opening LCMM has expanded to include 18 buildings at two sites housing collections and exhibits, a boat shop and small shipyard, blacksmith facilities, an archaeological conservation laboratory, a museum store, offices, and lecture space.

LCMM expanded in 2001 with the opening of the Burlington Shipyard in the city of Burlington, Vermont, some 20 miles north of LCMM's main campus. The following year the museum acquired the Capt. White Place, a c.1815 ship captain's home in Burlington, and in 2004 moved its Burlington offices and exhibits from the shipyard into the Lyman Building, a city-owned facility on the Burlington waterfront.

In June 2017, the museum announced a five-phase $44 million plan to raise and preserve the Spitfire, a gunboat that was sunk in the Battle of Valcour Island.

== Replica fleet ==
The museum has a collection of replica vessels to study the region's maritime history. These replicas provide insights into the ships, their crews, and the era they represent.

The first replica made was the Perseverance, a Bateau from the French and Indian War era, completed in 1986. Encouraged by its success, the museum then built the Philadelphia II, a revolutionary war gunboat, launched in 1991. This replica is an accurate reproduction of the original vessel which was sunk in combat at the Battle of Valcour Island, which was raised from the lake's bottom in 1935 and is currently preserved at the Smithsonian Institution.

The museum's primary vessel is the canal schooner Lois McClure, launched in 2004, built by a partnership between the museum and the Lake Champlain Transportation Company. Its design is based on the General Butler, a schooner wrecked in Burlington Harbor on December 9, 1876, and the O.J. Walker, another sailing canal boat which sank in 1895.

== Programming ==
LCMM conducts educational, boatbuilding, and boating programs, and hosts lectures, annual juried photography shows, and historical re-enactment events. LCMM also offers classes ranging from on-water exploration to traditional crafts; and staff educators conduct wintertime outreach to area schools, visiting students in their classrooms and helping them learn about the American Revolutionary War, 19th-century maritime commerce, and Lake Champlain's archaeological resources.

Area youth organizations partner with the museum to build either a Cornish pilot gig or a Whitehall pulling boat through a collaborative building process.

== Events ==
In 2005, the Lois McClure toured the lake and the Hudson River. A similar tour was carried out in 2007 on the New York State Barge Canal, the present-day incarnation of the Erie Canal.

Some of the museum's regular annual special events include rowing competitions and the Rabble In Arms historical re-enactment weekend. There is also an annual small boat show, and exhibits of photos taken by both amateur and professional photographers from around the region.

== See also ==
- List of maritime museums in the United States
- List of museum ships
