= USS Royal Savage (1775) =

Two-masted schooner built by the British in the summer of 1775

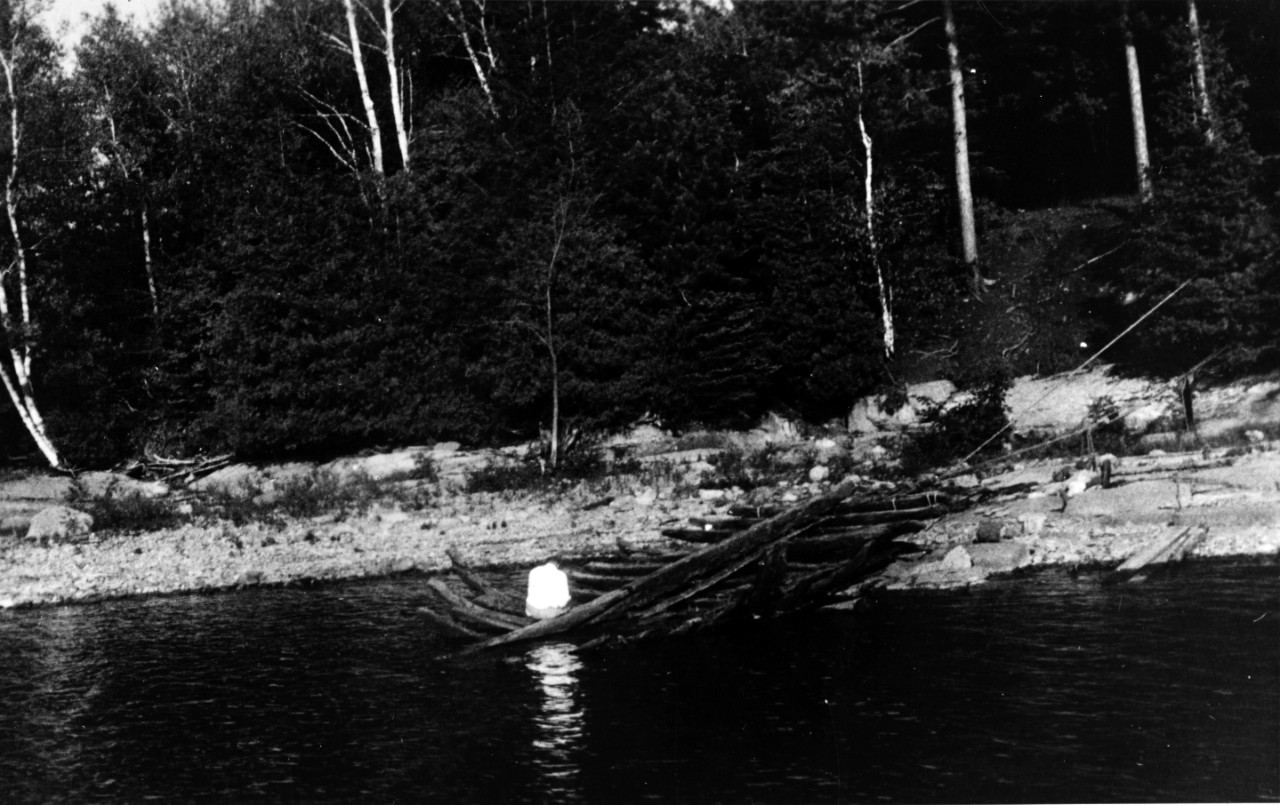
- The wreck of Royal Savage, 1934

History

Great Britain
- Name: Royal Savage
- Launched: Summer 1775, St. John, Quebec
- Renamed: Royal Savage
- Captured: 3 November 1775
- Fate: Sunk 14 October 1775

United Colonies
- Name: Yankee (initially)
- Acquired: 3 November 1775 by capture
- Renamed: Royal Savage
- Captured: 11 October 1776 (burnt)

General characteristics
- Type: Schooner
- Tons burthen: 70 (bm)
- Length: 50 ft (15 m)
- Beam: 15 ft (4.6 m)
- Sail plan: gaff-rig
- Complement: 40–50
- Armament: 8 × 4-pounder + 4 × 6-pounder guns + 10 × swivel guns (Note: British records after the battle of Valcour Island report eight 6-pounder and four 4-pounder guns.)

Royal Savage was a two-masted schooner built by the British in the summer of 1775. She was damaged and sunk by American troops during the siege of Fort St. Jean and later raised and repaired after the fort was captured, being commissioned into the Continental Navy as the 12-gun USS Royal Savage. She then participated in General Benedict Arnold's campaign on Lake Champlain. The British captured and burnt her in October 1776 at Valcour Island.

== Design ==
Royal Savage was estimated to be 50 ft (15 m) long and 15 ft (4.6 m) wide and measured 70 tons.

In American service she was armed with eight 4-pounder guns, four 6-pounder guns, and ten swivel guns. Royal Savage had a crew of 40 to 50 men.

== British service history ==
In 1775 HMS Gaspée arrived at Quebec to take on provisions. There Colonel Guy Carleton, Lieutenant-Governor of the province of Quebec, prevailed upon her commander, Lieutenant William Hunter, to take some his men to Lake Champlain and there take command of a vessel that Carleton was having built at St Johns (St. Jean-Iberville, Quebec) to oppose advancing American forces under Richard Montgomery. Lieutenant Hunter took command of Royal Savage.

In mid-September, the Americans began a siege of Fort St Jean, assisted by gallies and gundalows.

On 11 October the Americans established a battery on the river bank opposite the fort and Royal Savage. Fire from a 13" mortar in the battery sank her on 14 October.

The British were forced to surrender St Johns on 3 November. Hunter and 14 of his men were among the prisoners-of-war.

== American service history ==
Royal Savage had been sunk in shallow water and the Americans were able to raise her and return her to service. She, with the small schooner Liberty and the sloop Enterprise (ex-HMS George III), formed the nucleus of the American Lake Champlain squadron. That squadron, under Benedict Arnold, denied the British the use of the lake during the fall of 1776 and thus contributed to Burgoyne's defeat at Saratoga.

=== Summer 1776 ===
In June 1776, the American force, pushed from Canada, fell back to Crown Point, Skenesborough, and Fort Ticonderoga. There Arnold pressed his force to complete a shipbuilding program before the British completed their squadron. In late August, 10 of his ships were finished and he moved north with Royal Savage as his flagship. Royal Savage was under the command of Captain Jacobus Wynkoop, but a dispute with Arnold led to Wynkoop being cashiered. Captain David Hawley replaced Wynkoop on 18 August.

Into September Arnold scouted the lakeshore. On 23 September he moved his fleet into an anchorage at Valcour Island, separated from the western shore by a half-mile channel, to await the remainder of his squadron, and the British. With the arrival of the galley Congress, Arnold shifted his headquarters to that boat, and continued to wait.

=== Battle of Valcour Island ===
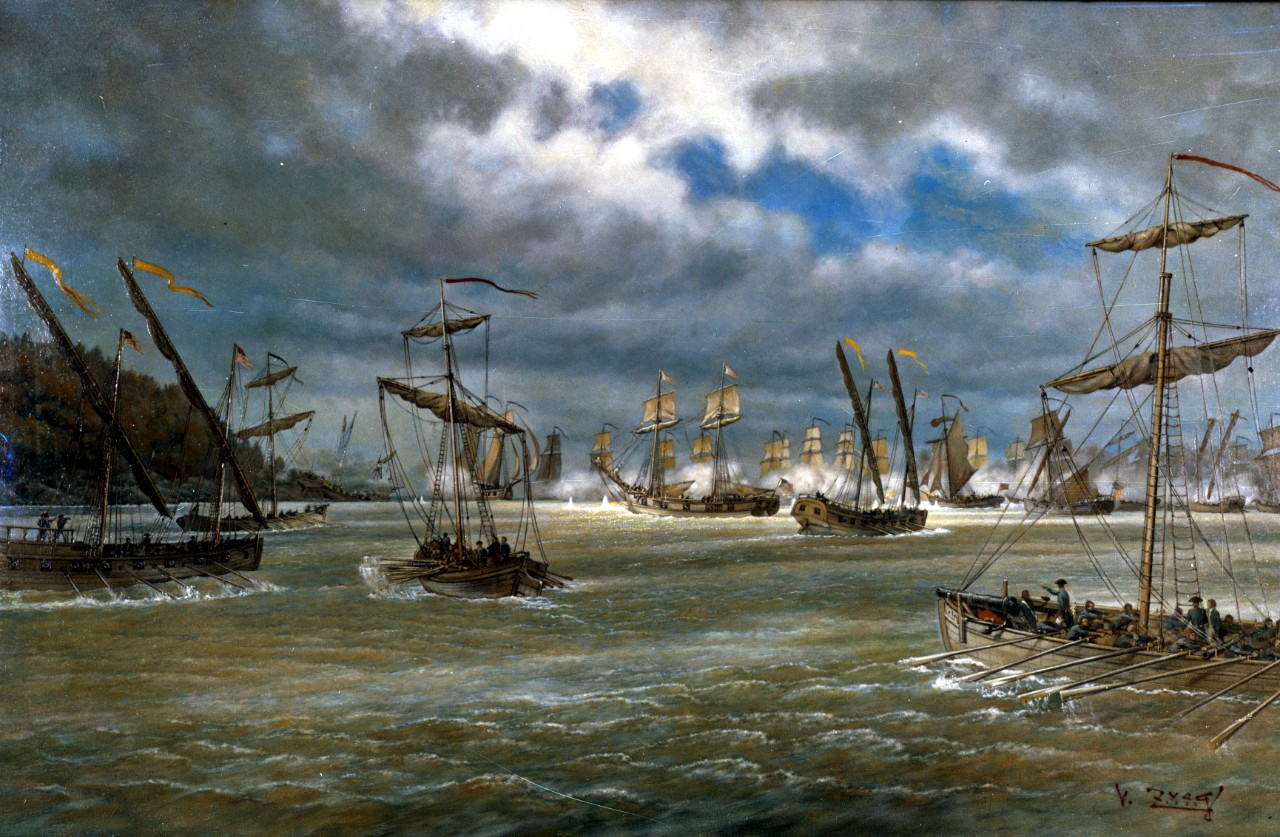
Painting of the Battle of Valcour Island

On 11 October the north wind carried the British past the island. American ships, including Royal Savage, appeared; fired on the enemy, and beat back into the southern entrance to the channel, where the remainder of Arnold's force was positioned to meet the enemy, beat him if possible, but, at all cost, to delay him.

Coming in from the south, the British force was handicapped by the wind. Arnold's planning and the British acceptance of the bait had given the Americans a chance to carry out their mission.

Royal Savage, however, ran aground on the southwest point of Valcour Island around 11 am when attempting to return to the American line, and, undefendable, was abandoned. Despite attempts to reboard her, she was taken by a British boarding party from Loyal Convert, who captured 20 men in the process. The British turned her guns against the American fleet. The British too, however, soon found themselves under considerable fire and had to abandon Royal Savage.

The British didn't want to give the Americans an opportunity to retake Royal Savage so they set fire to her sometime after dark. This, though, led to unintentionally helping the American fleet escape in the night. With the fire burning all night she provided a magnificent distraction. Combined with a moonless night, the ammunition blowing up, and staring at the fire, the British were unable to see the American fleet slip away.

== Preservation ==
Royal Savage remained in the lake until the marine salvor and amateur archaeologist Lorenzo Hagglund raised her in 1934. According to Art Cohn, Hagglund's family held onto the remains of the ship and associated artifacts until the city of Harrisburg, Pennsylvania purchased them in 1995.

The remains were sold to Harrisburg for $42,500 with the plan of five museums being created in the city. The ship had no connections to either the city of Harrisburg or the state of Pennsylvania, but with plans of revolving displays that would cover different periods of history the then mayor, Stephen R. Reed, was able to rationale the purchase. However, only two of the planned six museums opened and the plans to display Royal Savage stalled with the remains being piled up in the corner of one of the city garages.

In October 2013 the city council tried to recoup some of the city's money by auctioning off the remains of Royal Savage. They had already auctioned off in Dallas, Texas some other artefacts in 2006 that had an American West connection. The pre-auction estimates for Royal Savage ranged between $20,000 and $30,000. This fell well below the $42,500 that had been paid for her in 1995. The starting bid was set at $10,000 but she was only able to bring $5,000. However, in the end the bidder decided not to take possession of Royal Savage and Harrisburg retained ownership.

In July 2015 the city of Harrisburg was formally presented with the remains of Royal Savage.

Mayor Eric Papenfuse presided over the event in which Naval History and Heritage Command (NHHC) Director Sam Cox accepted the artefacts on behalf of the Navy:

This ship, and its artifacts are now going to be preserved and cherished for the public for generations to come as they should be. For the last 20 years, the artifacts have stayed in storage, out of public viewing, and we are pleased today to bring them to the light of day and to make sure they are being given the proper care.
