= Schuyler Island =

Island in Essex County, New York, United States

- Location within New York

Geography
- Location: Lake Champlain
- Coordinates: 44°29′57″N 73°22′32″W
- Area: 161 acres (65 ha)

Administration
- United States
- State: New York
- County: Essex
- Town: Chesterfield
- Owner: New York State Department of Environmental Conservation

Schuyler Island, also known as Schuyler's Island or Whitney Island, is a 161-acre (0.65 km^{2}) uninhabited island in Lake Champlain. It is a part of the Town of Chesterfield in Essex County, New York, located between Port Kent, New York and Willsboro Bay, opposite Burlington, Vermont.

Schuyler Island was involved in the 1776 Battle of Valcour during the American Revolutionary War, and is today managed as part of Adirondack Park, with several unimproved campsites available.

== History ==
The island played a brief role during the American Revolutionary War. Following the Battle of Valcour on October 11, 1776, the fleet of American General Benedict Arnold used the island as a location to regroup and commence repairs. Two small ships of the fleet that were deemed beyond repair were sunk near the island at this time.

The island passed through a series of private owners during the 19th and early to mid 20th centuries, during which time the island was occasionally farmed. The island became alternately known as "Whitney Island" in reference to the Whitney family, who owned the island between 1891 and 1950. The island was sold to New York State in November 1967, originally intended for inclusion in a regional outdoor recreation complex; however none of the planned improvements were enacted on the island.

== Public use ==
The island is today designated as the Schuyler Island Primitive Area within New York's Adirondack Park. It is administered by the New York State Department of Environmental Conservation. Unimproved camping sites are available and the island is a popular stop for lake boaters. Hunting for whitetail deer and waterfowl is permitted on the island.

A light tower is maintained by the U.S. Coast Guard on the island.
