= Row galley =

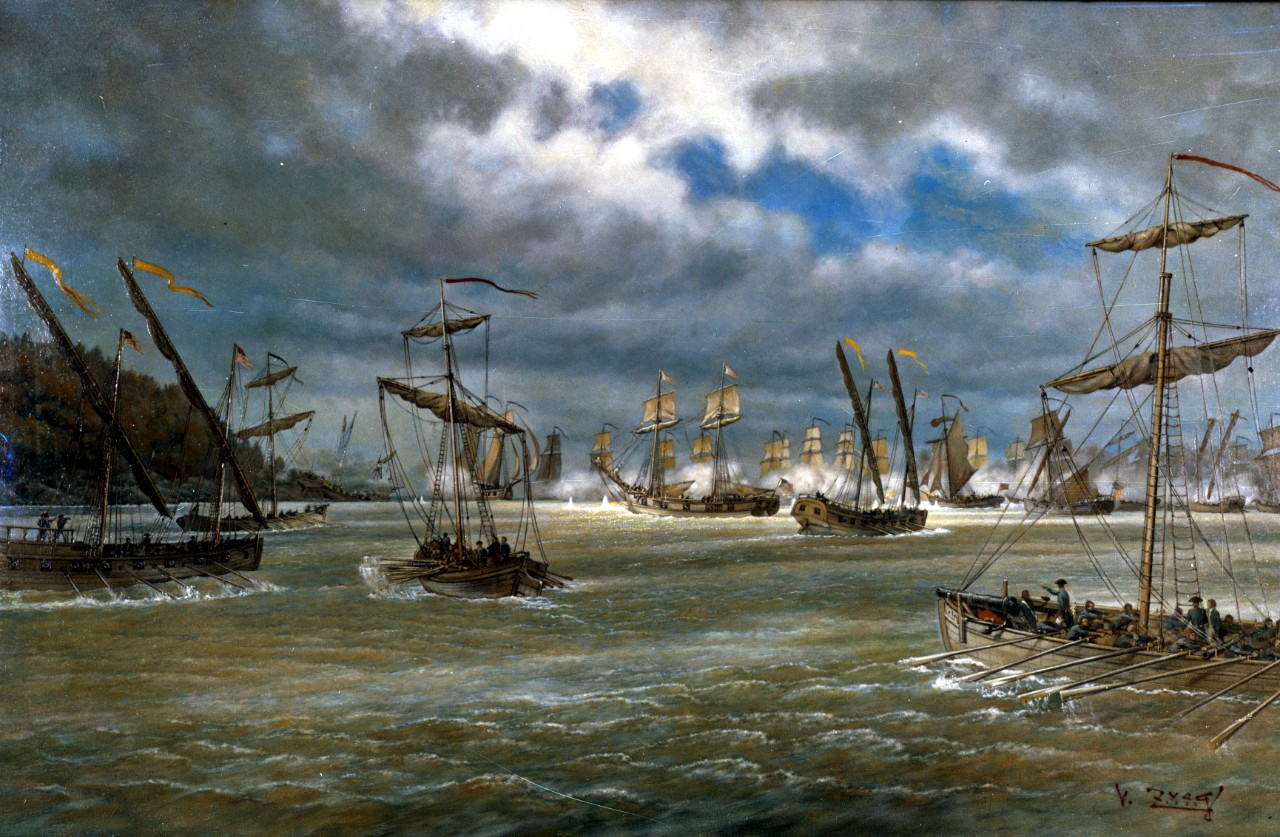
Painting of the Battle of Valcour Island, depicting several American row galleys

A row galley was a term used in the United States for an armed watercraft that used oars rather than sails as a means of propulsion. During the Age of Sail, row galleys had the advantage of propulsion while sail boats might be stopped or running at slow speed because of lack of wind for their sails. While called galleys, they were based on different hull type than the Mediterranean galley, the term being used mainly due to the employment of oars.

Row galleys were often fitted with sails in addition to their oars. During the American Revolutionary War, row galleys, such as Spitfire and Washington, with crews of up to 60 oarsmen, were employed successfully in battle against larger warships. During the American Civil War, Union navy and Confederate States Navy ships operating in rivers and other interior waterways, would send row galleys to surprise and capture enemy ships anchored for the night.
