= USS Congress (1776) =

Row galley of the Continental Navy

History

United States
- Name: USS Congress
- Launched: 1776 at Skenesborough, New York
- In service: circa 6 October 1776
- Out of service: 13 October 1776
- Stricken: 1776 (est.)
- Fate: Sunk, 13 October 1776

General characteristics
- Tonnage: 123
- Length: 72 ft 4 in (22.05 m)
- Beam: 19 ft 7 in (5.97 m)
- Depth of hold: 6 ft 2 in (1.88 m)
- Propulsion: Rowed by manpower
- Speed: Not known
- Complement: 80 officers and enlisted
- Armament: 2 × 12-pounder guns; 2 × 8-pounder guns; 4 × 6-pounder guns

USS Congress was an 8-gun row galley of the Continental Navy during the American Revolutionary War.

The galley – which was rowed by oarsmen instead of using sail - had the distinction of serving the young American Navy for only a week before being scuttled after combat with the British.

== American Revolution service ==
The galley built at the direction of Brigadier General Benedict Arnold at Skenesborough, New York, in 1776 for a fleet intended to impede British advance southward on Lake Champlain. Joining Arnold's fleet on 6 October 1776, Congress, and her crew of 80, served as flagship during the Battle of Valcour Island on Lake Champlain, fought on 11–13 October of that year. During the first day's lengthy engagement she fought valiantly, but suffered extensive damage to her hull, mast, and yards, at the hands of the vastly superior British force.

On 12 October the American Continental Fleet, hopeful of further delaying the enemy as well as escaping to Crown Point, New York, slipped through the British line under cover of darkness, only to be overtaken the following day at Split Rock. In the ensuing engagement, Congress was so shattered that Arnold was obliged to run her ashore and set the ship ablaze.

Although more than 20 of her crew were killed and Congress herself was destroyed, the mission of the ship and the fleet was accomplished. The British, their advance delayed until the season was too late for land operations, withdrew to Canada. The Americans used the time thus gained to equip and train the Army which defeated the next British invasion attempt, at Saratoga, New York, on 17 October 1777.

This major victory was a most powerful factor, in influencing France to throw her might, including the large French Navy, on the side of the struggling young republic.
