= Gundalow =

Type of New England sailing barge

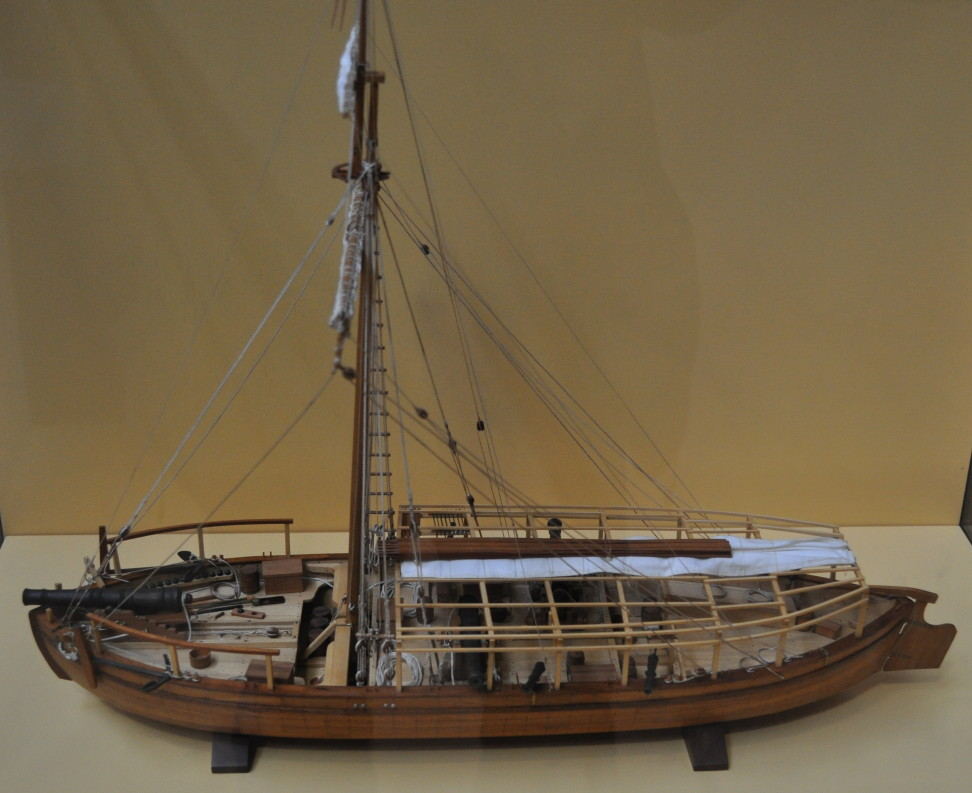
A model of the gundalow USS Philadelphia (1776)

A gundalow (also known in period accounts as a "gondola") is a type of flat-bottomed sailing barge once common in Maine and New Hampshire rivers, United States. It first appeared in the mid-1600s, reached maturity of design in the 1700 and 1800s, and lingered into the early 1900s before nearly vanishing as a commercial watercraft.

== Characteristics ==
A form of sailing barge similar to a scow, gundalows characteristically employed tidal currents for propulsion, but shipped a single lateen sail brailed to a heavy yard to harness winds. The yard was attached to a stump mast and heavily counterweighted, pivoting down while still under sail to shoot under bridges while maintaining the boat's way.

Up to 70 feet (21.34 m) long, gundalows were fitted with a pivoting leeboard in lieu of a fixed keel, giving them an exceptionally shallow draft and allowing them to "take the hard" (settle into sand, ledge, or mudflats) both for loading and unloading cargoes and maintenance.

== Cargoes ==
Common cargoes were bricks, timber, cattle, sheep, and other bulk raw materials downriver, and finished goods up. Gundalows were very active delivering cordwood to brickworks to fire their kilns, picking up cargoes of finished bricks in return.

== As naval vessels ==
Cannon-sporting gunboat style gundalows with fixed masts and square yards were built and deployed on Lake Champlain by both British and American forces during the American Revolutionary War, meeting in combat at the Battle of Valcour Island.

== Today ==
The Coast Guard-certified Piscataqua, a reproduction gundalow built in 2010 on the grounds of Strawbery Banke, is maintained by a Portsmouth, New Hampshire non-profit and employed extensively in both grade school educational programs and raising environmental awareness among neighboring New Hampshire and Maine seacoast communities. Its precursor, the Captain Edward Adams, built with traditional materials and methods in 1982, was installed as part of the Henry Law Playground in Dover, New Hampshire, along the Cocheco River, one of the tidal headwaters of the Piscataqua River separating the states of Maine and New Hampshire.

== See also ==
- Battle of Valcour Island, in the American Revolutionary War, in which gundalows were used
- Gandelow, a type of flat-bottomed fishing boat used on the River Shannon in Ireland
- Noble train of artillery, in which gundalows were used to transport heavy weaponry in the American Revolutionary War

== General and cited references ==
- Cross-Grained & Wiley Waters: A Guide to the Piscataqua Maritime Region, Jeffrey W. Bolster, Editor; Peter Randall Publisher, Portsmouth, 2001
- The Way of the Ship: America’s Maritime History Reenvisioned, 1600–2000, Alex Roland, W. Jeffrey Bolster, Alexander Keyssar, Authors, Wiley, NY, 2007
- Ports of Piscataqua; soundings in the maritime history of the Portsmouth, N.H., Customs District from the days of Queen Elizabeth and the planting of Strawberry Banke to the times of Abraham Lincoln and the waning of the American clipper, William G. Saltonstall, New York, Russell & Russell [1968, c. 1941]
- The Piscataqua Gundalow: Workhorse for a Tidal Basin Empire, Richard E. Winslow, III, Portsmouth, NH, Peter Randall, Publisher (Portsmouth Marine Society) 2002
