= Eyre (surname) =

Eyre is a surname with origins in England.

== Origin ==
Truelove the "Eyr" or "Heyr" was granted land in Derby as a reward for his services at the 1066 Battle of Hastings, and it has been claimed he had a coat of arms featuring "a human leg in armour couped at the thigh quarterly argent and sable spurred", in reference to the sacrifice of his limb. This is unlikely, as individuals did not have coats of arms at the time. However, some very old features may persist from the Middle Ages in one of the current Eyre coats of arms, which features three gold quatrefoils on a black chevron with a white background.

Another variation of the story of the origin of the Eyre coat of arms is that Humphrey le Heyr of Bromham rescued Richard Coeur de Lion at the siege of Ascalon, at the cost of his leg, and that the leg couped was granted to him in remembrance of the occasion.

== People ==
- Agnes Gardner Eyre (1881–1950), American pianist and composer
- Alan Eyre (1930–2020), British-born Jamaican geographer
- Alan Eyre (diplomat), Persian-language spokesperson of the United States Department of State
- Anthony Eyre (Boroughbridge MP) (1727–88)
- Anthony Eyre (Nottinghamshire MP) (1634–71)
- Charles Eyre (disambiguation), several people
- Chris Eyre, film director and producer
- Damian Eyre, Australian police officer murdered in 1988
- Damian Eyre (cricketer), British cricketer
- Edward John Eyre, Australian explorer and Jamaican Governor
- Ella Eyre, British singer-songwriter
- George Eyre (died 1839), Royal Navy officer
- Giles Eyre (disambiguation), several people
- Henry Eyre (barrister) (1628–1678), British politician and lawyer
- Henry Eyre (British Army officer) (1834–1904), British Army officer and politician
- Isaac Eyre (1875–1947), English footballer
- Ivan Eyre, Canadian artist
- James Eyre (disambiguation), several people
- Jane Eyre (New Zealand artist) (1874–1952)
- Jehu Eyre (1738–1781), American businessman, soldier the American Revolution and diarist, member of the Eyre family (see below)
- Jim Eyre (caver) (1925–2008), British caver
- Jim Eyre (architect), British architect and winner of the Bodley Medal
- John Eyre (disambiguation), several people
- Kingsmill Eyre (1682–1743), English garden designer and inventor
- Les Eyre, former Norwich City F.C. footballer
- Manuel Eyre (1736–1805), figure of the American Revolution and business leader in the early American Republic
- Mary Eyre (1923–2013), British sportswoman and administrator
- M. Banning Eyre, Canadian writer and guitarist
- Peter Eyre (born 1942), American-born English actor
- Peter Eyre (cricketer) (1939–2025), English cricketer
- Reginald Eyre (1924–2019), British politician
- Richard Eyre (disambiguation), several people
- Robert Eyre (disambiguation), several people
- Samuel Eyre (1633–1698), English judge
- Scott Eyre, Major League Baseball relief pitcher
- Thomas Eyre, multiple people
- Tommy Eyre, English rock musician
- Wayne Eyre, Canadian general
- William Eyre (disambiguation), several people
- Willie Eyre, Major League Baseball relief pitcher
- Wilson Eyre (1858–1944), American architect

== Fictional characters ==
- Jane Eyre (character), the titular protagonist of the novel by Charlotte Brontë

== See also ==
- Eyre family
