= List of ship launches in 1776 =

The list of ship launches in 1776 includes a chronological list of some ships launched in 1776.

Date	Ship	Class	Builder	Location	Country	Notes
24 January	Cygnet	Swan-class ship-sloop	Edward Hunt	Portsmouth Dockyard	Great Britain	For Royal Navy.
January	Washington	Galley		Rhode Island	Thirteen Colonies	For Rhode Island General Assembly.
8 March	Hound	Swan-class ship-sloop	Adams & Barnard	Deptford	Great Britain	For Royal Navy.
18 March	Vulture	Swan-class ship-sloop	John & William Wells	Deptford	Great Britain	For Royal Navy.
19 March	Hornet	Swan-class ship-sloop	John Perry	Blackwall Yard	Great Britain	For Royal Navy.
20 March	Perseus	Sphinx-class post ship	John Randall	Rotherhithe	Great Britain	For Royal Navy.
21 March	Daphne	Sphinx-class post ship	Nicholas Phillips	Woolwich Dockyard	Great Britain	For Royal Navy.
21 March	Galatea	Sphinx-class post ship	Adam Hayes	Deptford Dockyard	Great Britain	For Royal Navy.
23 March	Unicorn	Sphinx-class post ship	John Randall	Rotherhithe	Great Britain	For Royal Navy.
30 March	San Dámaso	San Joaquin-class ship of the line		Carthagena	Spain	For Spanish Navy.
6 April	Spy	Swan-class ship-sloop	Edward Greaves	Limehouse	Great Britain	For Royal Navy.
20 April	Camilla	Sphinx-class post ship	Israel Pownoll	Chatham Dockyard	Great Britain	For Royal Navy.
2 May	Sachem	Sloop-of-war			United States	For Continental Navy.
8 May	Coureur	Lugger	Jacques Denys	Dunkirk	Kingdom of France	For French Navy.
18 May	Culloden	Culloden-class ship of the line	Adam Hayes	Deptford Dockyard	Great Britain	For Royal Navy.
21 May	Cormorant	Swan-class ship-sloop	John Barnard	Harwich	Great Britain	For Royal Navy.
21 May	Raleigh	Frigate	James Hackett	Kittery, Maine	Thirteen Colonies	For Continental Navy.
May	Providence	Frigate	Silvester Bowes	Providence, Rhode Island	Thirteen Colonies	For Continental Navy.
3 June	Boston	Frigate	Stephen & Ralph Cross	Newburyport, Massachusetts	Thirteen Colonies	For Continental Navy.
3 June	Hancock	Frigate		Newburyport, Massachusetts	Thirteen Colonies	For Continental Navy.
13 June	Oliver Cromwell	Corvette	Uriah Hayden		Thirteen Colonies	For Connecticut State Navy.
20 June	Aetna	Etna-class bomb vessel	John Randall	Rotherhithe	Great Britain	For Royal Navy.
3 July	Vesuvius	Etna-class bomb vessel	John Perry	Blackwall Yard	Great Britain	For Royal Navy.
10 July	Randolph	Frigate	Wharton & Humphreys	Philadelphia, Pennsylvania	United States	For Continental Navy.
26 July	Bulldog	Galley	Manuel Eyre	Kensington, Philadelphia	United States	For Pennsylvania State Navy.
27 July	Favorite	Corvette	Jean-Joseph Ginoux	Havre de Grâce	Kingdom of France	For French Navy.
July	Delaware	Frigate	Warwick Coates	Philadelphia, Pennsylvania	United States	For Continental Navy.
July	Tyrannicide	Brigantine		Salisbury, Massachusetts	United States	For Massachusetts State Navy.
3 August	Officeuse	Storeship	Jean-Joseph Ginoux	Havre de Grâce	Kingdom of France	For French Navy.
7 August	Washington	Frigate	Benjamin, Jehu and Manuel Eyre	Philadelphia, Pennsylvania	United States	For Continental Navy.
12 August	Virginia	Frigate	George Wells	Fells Point, Maryland	United States	For Continental Navy.
August	Philadelphia	Gundalow	Hermanus Schuyler	Skenesborough, New York	United States	For Continental Navy.
5 September	Trumbull	Frigate	John Cotton	Chatham, Connecticut	United States	For Continental Navy.
10 September	Trumbull	Galley		Skenesborough, New York	United States	For Continental Navy.
14 September	Fly	Swan-class ship-sloop	George White	Sheerness Dockyard	Great Britain	For Royal Navy.
27 September	Ménagère	Sixth rate	François-Guillaume Clairain des Lauriers	Rochefort	Kingdom of France	For French Navy.
September	Fendant	Ship of the line		Rochefort	Kingdom of France	For French Navy.
September	Row Galley Number One	Galley		New York	United States	For Royal Navy.
September	Row Galley Number Two	Galley		New York	United States	For Royal Navy.
September	Washington	Galley		Skenesborough, New York	United States	For Continental Navy.
October	Montgomery	Frigate	Lancaster Burling	Poughkeepsie, New York	United States	For Continental Navy.
29 October	Congress	Galley	Lancaster Burling	Skenesborough, New York	United States	For Continental Navy.
7 November	Effingham	Fifth rate	Joseph Grice	Philadelphia, Pennsylvania	United States	For Continental Navy.
25 November	Réfléchi	Solitaire-class ship of the line	Chevalier Antoine Groignard	Rochefort	Kingdom of France	For French Navy.
26 November	Lynx	Merchantman		Whitby	Great Britain	For private owner.
26 November	Ruby	Intrepid-class ship of the line	Nicholas Phillips	Woolwich Dockyard	Great Britain	For Royal Navy.
27 December	Ariadne	Sphinx-class post ship	William Pownall	Chatham Dockyard	Great Britain	For Royal Navy.
27 December	Pegasus	Swan-class ship-sloop	William Pownall	Chatham Dockyard	Great Britain	For Royal Navy.
December	Row Galley Number Three	Galley		New York	United States	For Royal Navy.
December	Row Galley Number Four	Galley		New York	United States	For Royal Navy.
Spring	Lady Washington	Galley		New York	Thirteen Colonies	For Continental Navy.
Summer	Congress	Frigate	Lancaster Birling	Poughkeepsie, New York	United States	For Continental Navy.
Summer	Revenge	Schooner	Jeduthan Baldwin	Fort Ticonderoga, New York	Thirteen Colonies	For Continental Navy.
Summer	New York	Gundalow		Lake Champlain, New York	United States	For Continental Navy.
Summer	Revenge	Schooner	Jeduthan Baldwin	Fort Ticonderoga, New York	United States	For Continental Navy.
Unknown date	Aimable	Alcmène-class frigate		Toulon	Kingdom of France	For French Navy.
Unknown date	America	Sloop			United States	For Connecticut State Navy.
Unknown date	Boston	Gundalow		Skenesborough, New York	United States	For Continental Navy.
Unknown date	Britannia	Merchantman		Philadelphia, Pennsylvania	Thirteen Colonies	For private owner.
Unknown date	Chambers	West Indiaman		Bristol	Great Britain	For Dinham & Co.
Unknown date	Connecticut	Gondola		Skenesborough, New York	United States	For Continental Navy.
Unknown date	Gates	Lugger		Lake Champlain	United States	For Continental Navy.
Unknown date	Greenwich	Privateer		East Greenwich, Rhode Island	United States	For Nathaniel Greene & Co.
Unknown date	Hümay-ı Bahri	Fourth rate		Rhodes	Ottoman Greece	For Ottoman Navy.
Unknown date	Independence	Galley			United States	For Continental Navy.
Unknown date	Indus	Schooner		Bombay	India	For Bombay Pilot Service.
Unknown date	Infodsretten	Third rate			Denmark-Norway	For Dano-Norwegian Navy.
Unknown date	Jersey	Gondola		Skenesborough, New York	United States	For Continental Navy.
Unknown date	Mountfield	Merchantman			Great Britain	For private owner.
Unknown date	Nerbudda	Schooner		Bombay	India	For Bombay Pilot Service.
Unknown date	New Haven	Gundalow		Lake Champlain	United States	For Continental Navy.
Unknown date	Nüvid-i Fütuh	Third rate		Sinop	Ottoman Empire	For Ottoman Navy.
Unknown date	Providence	Gundalow		Skenesborough, New York	United States	For Continental Navy.
Unknown date	Putnam	Brig			United States	For New Hampshire State Navy.
Unknown date	Ranger	Sloop	Nicholas Bools	Bridport	Great Britain	For D. Wincey.
Unknown date	Rose	Cutter			Great Britain	For Board of Customs.
Unknown date	Sartine	Frigate		Bordeaux	Kingdom of France	For Compagnie de la Guyane.
Unknown date	Shark	Sloop-of-war	Randall	Rotherhithe	Great Britain	For Royal Navy.
Unknown date	Shark	Galley	J. Lester	Norwich, Connecticut	United States	For Connecticut State Navy.
Unknown date	Sphinx	Ship of the line		Brest	Kingdom of France	For French Navy.
Unknown date	Spitfire	Galley		Rhode Island	Thirteen Colonies	For Rhode Island General Assembly.
date	Spitfire	Gundalow		Lake Champlain	United States	For Continental Navy.
Unknown date	Thomas Hall	West Indiaman		Liverpool	Great Britain	For private owner.
Unknown date	Warren	Frigate	Sylvester Bowers	Providence, Rhode Island	Thirteen Colonies	For Continental Navy.
Unknown date	Yorkshire	Merchantman		Whitby	Great Britain	For private owner.
Unknown date	Name unknown	Merchantman			Kingdom of France	For private owner.
Unknown date	Name unknown	Merchantman		River Thames	Great Britain	For private owner.
