= USS Washington (1776 frigate) =

History

United States
- Name: USS Washington
- Namesake: George Washington (1732–1799)
- Ordered: By Act of Congress 13 December 1775
- Builder: Manuel Eyre, Jehu Eyre, and Benjamin Eyre, Philadelphia, Pennsylvania
- Laid down: 1776
- Launched: 7 August 1776
- Completed: Never
- Commissioned: Never
- Fate: Scuttled incomplete 2 November 1777; Portion above water burned May 1778; Bottom salvaged and sold

General characteristics
- Type: Frigate
- Length: Probably 132 ft 9 in (40.46 m)
- Beam: Probably 34 ft 6 in (10.52 m) moulded
- Depth of hold: Probably 10 ft 6 in (3.20 m)
- Propulsion: Sails
- Armament: 26 × 12-pounder guns 10 × 6-pounder guns

USS Washington was a 36-gun frigate of the Continental Navy laid down in 1776 but never completed.

Washington was among thirteen frigates authorized to be constructed for the new Continental Navy by an Act of Congress of 13 December 1775, and among four to be built at Philadelphia, Pennsylvania. The act called for all thirteen ships to be ready for sea by March 1776. Official designs were drawn up for the ships, but credit for their design is a matter of dispute, with Joshua Humphreys, John Wharton, and Nathaniel Falconer all being possible designers. In any event, plans had been drawn up and copies made of them by 2 February 1776, too late for the ships to be completed by March 1776.

The design of the 32-gun frigate USS Randolph, also built at Philadelphia under the same construction program, probably to the same design as Washington - the two ships may even have been sisters - provides insight into the design of Washington, which has not survived. Randolph's design appears to have been inspired by British 36-gun frigates of the period. This resulted in a ship with a similar beam and depth of hold to the 36-gun British ships, but longer than the 36-gun frigates of the time, and thus oversized for her rate - much in the way the French Navy built oversized ships at that time. Randolph was planned to be somewhat more lightly built than the British frigates that inspired her design, with a broader frame spacing and a much more raked bow, but with less freeboard.

The thirteen ships were named on 6 June 1776. Washington, built by Manuel Eyre, Jehu Eyre, and Benjamin Eyre, was launched on 2 August 1776. She was not yet completed when British forces advancing on Philadelphia in 1777 during the American Revolutionary War threatened to capture her, and she was scuttled incomplete on 2 November 1777 to prevent capture. The portion of her hull remaining above water was burned 8 May 1778 by a British raiding party., while her bottom was salvaged and sold in Philadelphia.
