= Howard Baskerville =

American teacher (1885–1909)

Howard Conklin Baskerville
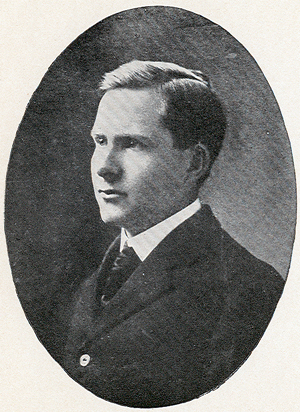
- Howard Baskerville
- Born: Howard Conklin Baskerville; 10 April 1885; North Platte, Nebraska, United States
- Died: 19 April 1909 (aged 24); Tabriz, East Azerbaijan, Sublime State of Iran
- Burial place: Tabriz, East Azerbaijan, Iran
- Parent(s): Henry Embry Coleman Baskerville; Emma R. Baskerville

Howard Conklin Baskerville (10 April 1885 – 19 April 1909) was an American missionary teacher. His life ambition was to become a pastor. He worked as a teacher employed by the American missionaries at the American Memorial School in Tabriz, a Presbyterian mission school, and was killed during the Persian constitutional revolution in an attempt to break the siege of Tabriz. He is often referred to as the "American Lafayette of Iran" and the "American Martyr of the Iranian Constitutional Movement".

Howard Baskerville came to Tabriz in the fall of 1907 to teach history. His arrival in Iran coincided with the period when Mohammad Ali Shah in Tehran shut down the parliament and dismantled the constitutional basis and ruled the period that is known as "The Short Tyranny" in Iran. At the same time, the people of Tabriz, led by Sattar Khan and Baqer Khan, rose up to restore constitutionalism, and subsequently, pro-Shah forces besieged Tabriz. After 11 months of siege and due to lack of medicine and food, a group in Tabriz called the "Foj Nejat" ("Rescue Squad"), led by Baskerville, was formed to break the siege. Baskerville, who had attended in the military service in the United States, decided to teach military exercises to young people instead of "narrating the history of the dead" as he called it. At the same time, the death of Seyed Hassan Sharifzadeh, a close friend of Baskerville, upset him so much that in response to the wife of the US consul in Tabriz, who asked him to leave the ranks of constitutionalists, he withdrew his passport and said: "The only difference between me and these people is my birthplace, and this is not a big difference." During the battle that took place in the Shanb Ghazan between the rescue squad led by Baskerville and the besiegers, Baskerville was killed by a bullet that hit him in the chest. After his death, a large funeral was held at the American Cemetery in Tabriz, which, according to Albert Charles Ratislaw, the British Consul in Tabriz, was a very impressive ceremony. Shortly afterward, Sattar Khan took Baskerville's rifle (which was in his hand at the time of his death), engraved his name and date of death on it and wrapped it in the Iranian flag, and sent it to his family in the United States.

Soroush Esfahani, an Iranian poet, has written in mourning for him and his three hundred Muslim friends: "We are 300 roses and a christian rose (Howard Baskerville) . We don't scare to lose our heads. if that otherwise, we didn't dance in the middle of lovers' celebration."

At present, a half-length statue of him has been installed in the Constitutional House of Tabriz. Some in the United States have suggested that April 19 be marked as "Iranian-American Friendship Day", the anniversary of Howard Baskerville's assassination.

== Personal life ==
Howard Conklin Baskerville was born on April 10, 1885, in North Platte, Nebraska. His father, grandfather, and four brothers were Presbyterian ministers. Baskerville's family was of Scottish descent. During his youth his family moved to Black Hills, South Dakota.

Baskerville entered Princeton University in 1903. He graduated from the university in May 1907. Princeton University was then headed by Woodrow Wilson, who later became President of the United States. His main subject was religion; however, he chose two other focuses of study: judicial procedure and constitutional government. His younger brother, Robert Baskerville, graduated from Princeton University in 1912.

Baskerville was fluent in Latin, Greek, and German by the time he graduated high school. Baskerville was originally intrigued by Persia through Robert Speer's obsession with Persia. Speer had close connections with the West Persia Mission of Presbyterians and was considering setting up a post in Tabriz and sending Baskerville there.

== Tabriz ==
While in his final year at Princeton University, he corresponded with the Presbyterian Board of Foreign Missions (PBFM) in New York, requesting to be sent abroad to gain experience in a new language and culture. His goal was to be based in a foreign land for about two years after which he would return to America to continue his theological studies and become an ordained minister similar to his father and grandfather. His application for foreign service with the PBFM eventually resulted in his assignment as a teacher working for American missionaries to teach in Tabriz. Since Baskerville was not an ordained minister and intended to only serve for two years he was sent to Iran as a teacher on a short-term contract rather than as a missionary. Tabriz at that time hosted a large community of Americans living in Iran. American Christian missionaries had established schools and hospitals in northwestern Iran as early as 1835, primarily for Iran's Armenian and Assyrian Christian populations. The Memorial School to which Baskerville was assigned as a teacher was one of the many schools established by Americans in Iran.

In the summer of 1907, Baskerville traveled to Tabriz, arriving there in early Autumn in time to teach English, history, and science to Iranian high school age young men at the American Memorial School, run by Presbyterian missionaries, on a two-year contract. He first sailed from the United States to England and from there to Iran. Then he traveled from Hamedan to Tabriz on horseback. Baskerville first settled in the home of Samuel Wilson (school principal). He later moved to the Memorial School, where American teachers lived.

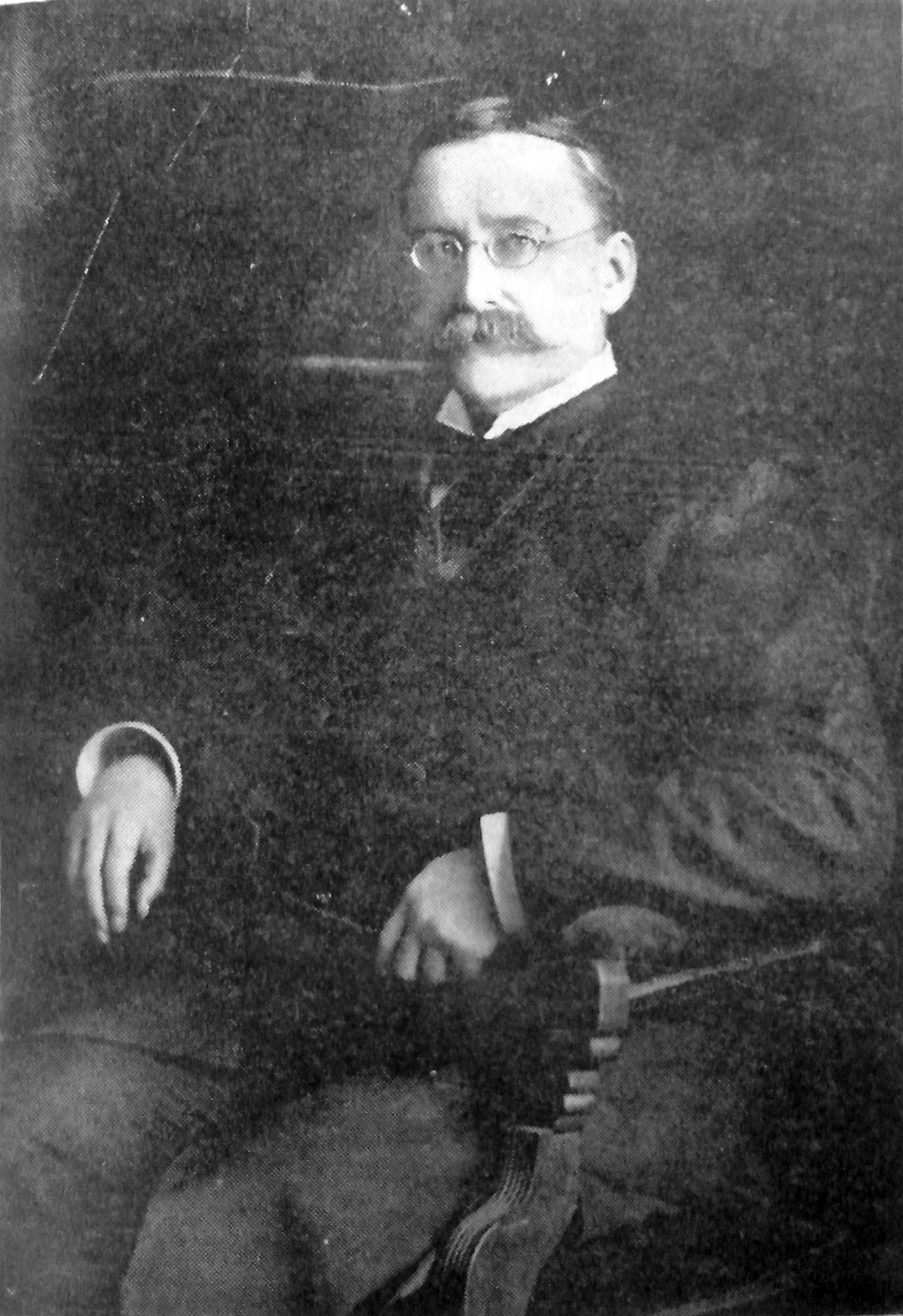
Samuel Graham Wilson Memorial school principal

Although he was not familiar with Persian or Azerbaijani, he still had a personal relationship with his students and met them at home. Sadegh Rezazadeh Shafaq, a student of Baskerville, who became close to him and acted as his translator, wrote about the day that Baskerville went to their house with Samuel Graham Wilson for Nowruz (Persian New Year):

Although Wilson spoke Azerbaijani well, Baskerville seemed restless all this time. As he left home, he was able to say a sentence he had memorized in Azeri: 'Happy New Year to all of you.'

In another section, Shafaq writes:

He was very well known and many people wanted to attend his history classes. A number of older students and schoolteachers, such as Seyed Hassan Sharifzadeh, called on Dr. Wilson to establish an international law class. He accepted and left the class to Baskerville.

== Participation in the constitutional Revolution of Iran ==
Baskerville's presence in Tabriz coincided with the days when Mohammad Ali Shah bombarded the parliament and suppressed the constitutionalists of different cities. On the other hand, the constitutionalists of Tabriz resisted the Shah's request to surrender, and the Shah ordered the siege of Tabriz.

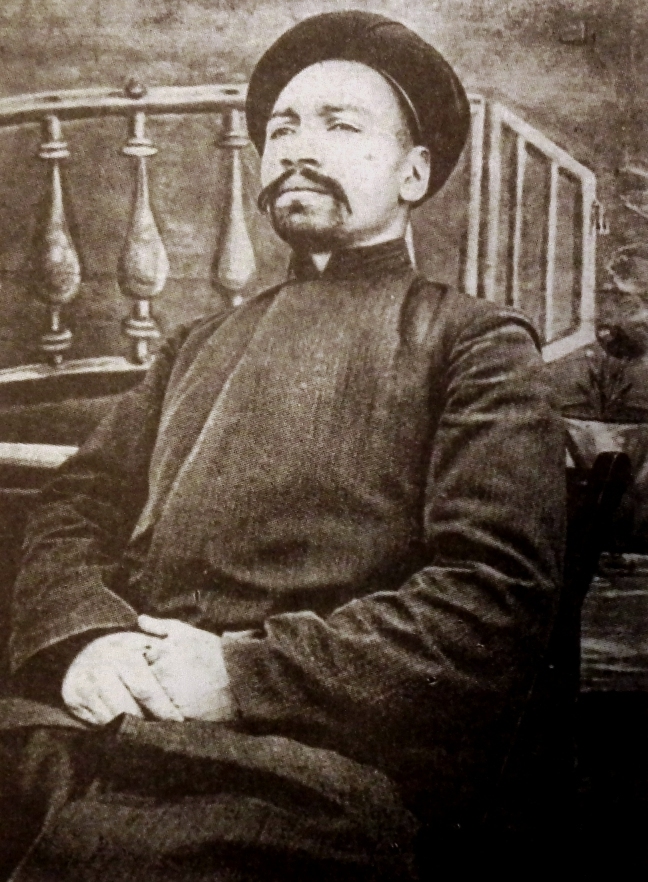
Hassan Sharifzadeh

Baskerville supported the Iranian constitutional revolution from the beginning of his arrival in Tabriz. After school, he was serving food for constitutionalists on the battlefield and criticizing the Anglo-Russian Convention with his students. Baskerville became close to Hassan Sharifzadeh, who was a literature teacher at the same school and was one of the influential leaders of the constitutional revolution in Tabriz. Sharifzadeh's assassination in 1908 deeply affected and upset him. This incident had a great impact on his joining the ranks of constitutional fighters.

=== Military training of constitutionalists ===
Baskerville had completed his military service in the United States shortly before he was sent to Iran. So after joining the ranks of the fighters, he took charge of providing military training to a group of constitutionalists, especially a number of Memorial School students. In March 1909, Baskerville decided to organize 150 of his students to help Sattar Khan break the siege of Tabriz. "He kept repeating that he could not sit still and watch the hungry people of the city fight for their rights through the window of a classroom", Shafaq wrote. Baskerville asked his soldiers to "take the lead in any war that took place, and when they approached the enemy they would not be in the trenches, they would attack the enemy with devotion".

=== U.S. government opposes Baskerville ===
Baskerville was under pressure from both groups for joining the Tabriz constitutionalists. The first group consisted of the parents of the school's students and the second group consisted of the American diplomatic mission stationed at the US Consulate in Tabriz. Due to the neutrality of the United States government in the case of Iran, the presence of an American citizen in the heart of the Tabriz struggle was not considered appropriate.

Therefore, in order for the American consul and school officials not to be aware of his actions, Baskerville intended the courtyard of Tabriz Citadel to provide military training to Tabriz constitutionalists and conducted military training in the Tabriz Citadel area every evening. To motivate the fighters, Baskerville sometimes spoke to them about the characters of the American Revolution.

Baskerville's actions and the conflict in Iran's internal affairs caused concern in Washington, and William Doty, the US consul in Tabriz, wrote a letter dated January 1, 1909, and then, in a meeting with Baskerville in the presence of Sattar Khan, tried to separate him from the ranks of constitutional fighters. Sattar Khan, while appreciating Baskerville, encouraged him to withdraw from the battle. On April 2, 1909, while Baskerville and his men were in military training, William F. Doty, the US consul in Tabriz, came to the parade and reminded Baskerville that as an American citizen, he had no right to interfere in Iran's domestic politics. In response, Baskerville called the struggle alongside the constitutionalists a defense of the lives and property of the Americans and the people of Tabriz. According to Shafaq, Baskerville said in response to the US consul: "I can not ignore the suffering of these people who are fighting for their rights. I am an American citizen and I am proud of that, but I am a human being and I cannot stop feeling sympathy for the people of this city." Doty asked Baskerville to return his passport. Ahmad Kasravi writes that he submitted his passport to the consulate but Thomas Ricks quotes, "I will not return my passport, and as an American I will support my just cause and join the Constitutional Revolution." Doty was furious that Baskerville was using the U.S. Consulate Library's Encyclopædia Britannica to find ways to make grenades.

The U.S. consul once again sent his wife to dissuade Baskerville. In the same days, Baskerville's close friend, Hassan Sharifzadeh, was killed and his death upset Baskerville so much that he replied to the US consul's wife: "The only difference between me and these people is my birthplace, and this is not a big difference." The US Department of State pressured the Central Committee of Christian Missionaries in New York to summon Baskerville from Iran, whose activities endangered the interests of the United States and the Presbyterian Church, until the news of Baskerville's resignation on April 16 was announced to Washington.

According to research by Thomas Ricks, at the time, the Department of Defense was opposed to the involvement of missionaries in Iran's internal affairs, and if missionaries interfered in Iran's internal affairs, they would lose their jobs. About 50 Christian Presbyterians living in Tabriz at the time could not join the ranks of constitutionalists due to their commitment to the church. But they respected Baskerville's efforts.

=== Forming rescue squad ===
In mid-April 1909, and ten months after the siege of Tabriz began, a small group called the Rescue Squad decided to cross the siege line and take food from the villages as food and medicine ran out. Baskerville volunteered for the mission and asked Sattar Khan for weapons. Sattar Khan believed that Baskerville and the soldiers of the Rescue Squad did not have enough experience to work with weapons, so he initially opposed their arming. But eventually the squad was armed. According to Annie Wilson, on April 15, she and a British journalist named D.C. Moore embarked on the mission. On April 19, the wheat supply in Tabriz was only enough for one day, and on the other hand, Sattar Khan failed to provide the cannon he had promised. Baskerville first tried to persuade Sattar Khan to ask the Europeans for help and surrender to the king on appropriate terms. But Sattar Khan was determined to launch another attack. Initially, at a meeting convened by the State Council on the night of Saturday, April 28, it was decided to attack the besieging group the following night, but it was finally decided that on Monday morning, April 19, to launch the attack.

With the help of the Rescue Squad that morning, it was decided to attack a part of the besieging forces of Tabriz, which was under the command of Samad Khan Shoja al-Dawla and a number of Cossacks, and break the city wall. Mehdi Alavizadeh, a member of the Rescue Squad, said: "The night the attack on Samad Khan's forces was to begin the next morning, Baskerville prepared and ordered his followers (members of the Rescue Squad) Before midnight, they gathered at the police station (Tabriz police building, which was one of the bases for nationalists)… (but) of those who had made a pact of sacrifice, only eleven people showed up, and others either did not show up, or their mothers and fathers Baskerville was aware, they stopped their sons; But from the others, a large group was prepared and around midnight we left for Qara Aghaj, and this neighborhood was full of fighters and artillerymen. We were taken to a mosque where we could rest for a few hours. "Baskerville did not rest for a while, and inside the mosque he forced us to practice."

D. C. Moore, who was in another group that day, explained: "I first heard that when he approached the enemy lines, the number of his troops had risen from 150 to five. But later, when I met the two men who were there, they said that there were about nine or 10 of them."

=== The Battle of Shanb Ghazan ===
Shafaq describes the beginning of the war as follows: "On the night of the 29th of Farvardin, the news of the readiness in the city was complicated. Our goal was the Shanb Ghazan. As I remember there was of us. It took us about an hour or so to reach Ghazan From the garden on the right side of the alley, we entered that alley and set foot there, Baskerville suddenly shouted "attack" and began to advance. Behind him I walked and several others accompanied. There was still silence, and perhaps the attackers wanted to surprise the other side. "It was still dark when suddenly a series of rifles were fired at us. Our commander (Baskerville) immediately lay down on the side of the road, and we followed him behind a small mound of dirt."

As Baskerville led his men toward the city wall, he was shot by a sniper from the royal forces. Baskerville also fired at him, pushing his men forward, thinking the sniper had fled the scene. When Baskerville turned his back, the sniper returned and fired two shots at him, which hit him in the heart and left the other side of his body.

Shafaq recounted:

When we were lying down, at the insistence of Hossein Khan Kermanshahi and others, I kept shouting to Baskerville, who was laying in an aqueduct, not to get up so that other warriors could push us back around the enemy and we could get out or continue our way, but sadly, Baskerville did not respond to my call and went to the left-hand garden through the channel under the wall, on the chest, and the garden wall was between us and him. Within minutes, a shout was heard from the surrounding trenches: "The American have been beaten." we saw. We dragged him under the shell and leaned on his chest under the shelter of a broken wall. One shouted enthusiastically, "He is alive," But not long after, he closed his shining eyes and took his last breath in this sponge of the world, on the bloody soils of Ghazan After that, the other fighters continued the war and as a result, other young people were killed or wounded and little progress was made.

In his memoirs, Mehdi Alavizadeh describes the events that led to Baskerville's death:

... Baskerville gave a second command and ran in front of the reckless Cossack stronghold, and several of us followed him; But the others, seeing the cannon and the bullets in front of them, did not follow and immediately split into two groups, one group reaching the gardens of this hand and one group reaching the gardens and digging behind the trees and walls. But as soon as Baskerville fired an arrow and ran a few steps, the Cossack fired at him and, as he fell, commanded him to lie down. At that moment, Baskerville's voice rose: "I was shot! ..." and with that he was silenced In the meantime, another group of gunmen went the other way and took the right side of the enemy, and as they fired, "The Cossacks had to move on, and in the meantime we took the opportunity to release the few and pull out Baskerville's bloody body."

Thus, Howard Baskerville was killed on Monday, April 19, 1909, just nine days after his 24th birthday, at the Battle of Ghazan.

A few days after Baskerville's death, Russian soldiers entered the city in Tabriz under the pretext of saving the lives of their citizens, and as a result, the siege of Tabriz was broken. Subsequently, the constitutionalists of Tabriz, along with the fighters of other cities, succeeded in conquering Tehran and overthrowing Mohammad Ali Shah.

== Burial ==
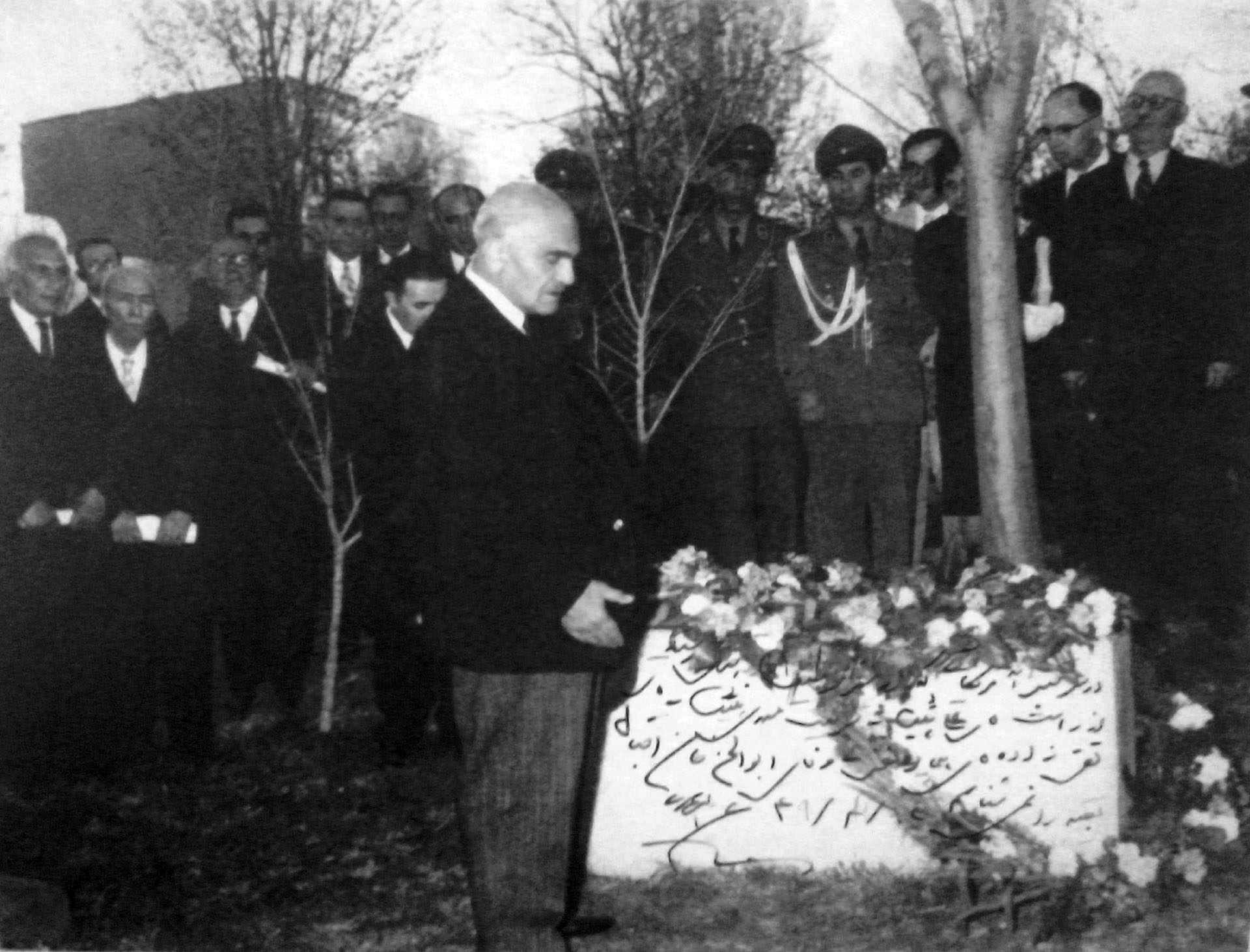
Seyyed Hassan Taghizadeh and Eghbal Azar paying respect to his grave

After Baskerville was killed, his body was taken to the Wilson family home and prepared for burial. "We know he gave his life for us", a businessman who brought cloth to decorate the Baskerville coffin told Annie Wilson. Thousands of people from Tabriz and Baskerville comrades attended the funeral. Shafaq described the ceremony as follows: "There was no room in the American Church due to the crowd and there was a strange crowd on the way. The body was moved to the Armenian Cemetery in Tabriz in front of the fighters and in front of his students and soldiers." Parents of the Memorial School and American personalities were also among the attendees. "Thousands of people had taken over the cemetery."

The British Consul in Tabriz, Albert Charles Ratislaw, reports that his funeral was a very influential one, attended by many members of the Azerbaijan Association and even attended the American Church to show their respect and appreciation for Baskerville which was quite unprecedented for Islamic hardliners.

In the cemetery, Seyed Hassan Taghizadeh, a member of the National Parliament, said in a short speech: "Young America sacrificed the young Baskerville for the young Iranian constitution." Ahmad Kasravi, an eyewitness to the events of the constitutional era in Tabriz, says: "... because he was considered a guest, everyone was saddened and withered when they heard of his death. In this regard, they decided to bury the dead body with great honor and glory. Although hunger has bothered everyone, but they didn't care and they wanted to please the young American's soul, standing all the way from the city to the cemetery, fighters lined up here and there with upside-down guns (as a sign of respect). Baskerville's disciples and his band of devotees, Armenians, Georgians, Americans, and all freedom fighters, large and small, marched around the corpse with a bouquet of flowers. Shortly afterwards, Sattar Khan sent his family Baskerville's rifle with his name and date of death engraved on it and wrapped in the Iranian flag, along with a photograph of members of the rescue squad.

Five days after Baskerville's funeral, Sattar Khan and Jamani Ayoleti sent the following telegram to his parents in Spicer, Minnesota:

Persia much regrets honorable loss of your dear son in the cause of liberty, and we give our parole that future Persia will always revere his name in her history like Lafayette and will respect his venerable tomb.

== Legacy ==
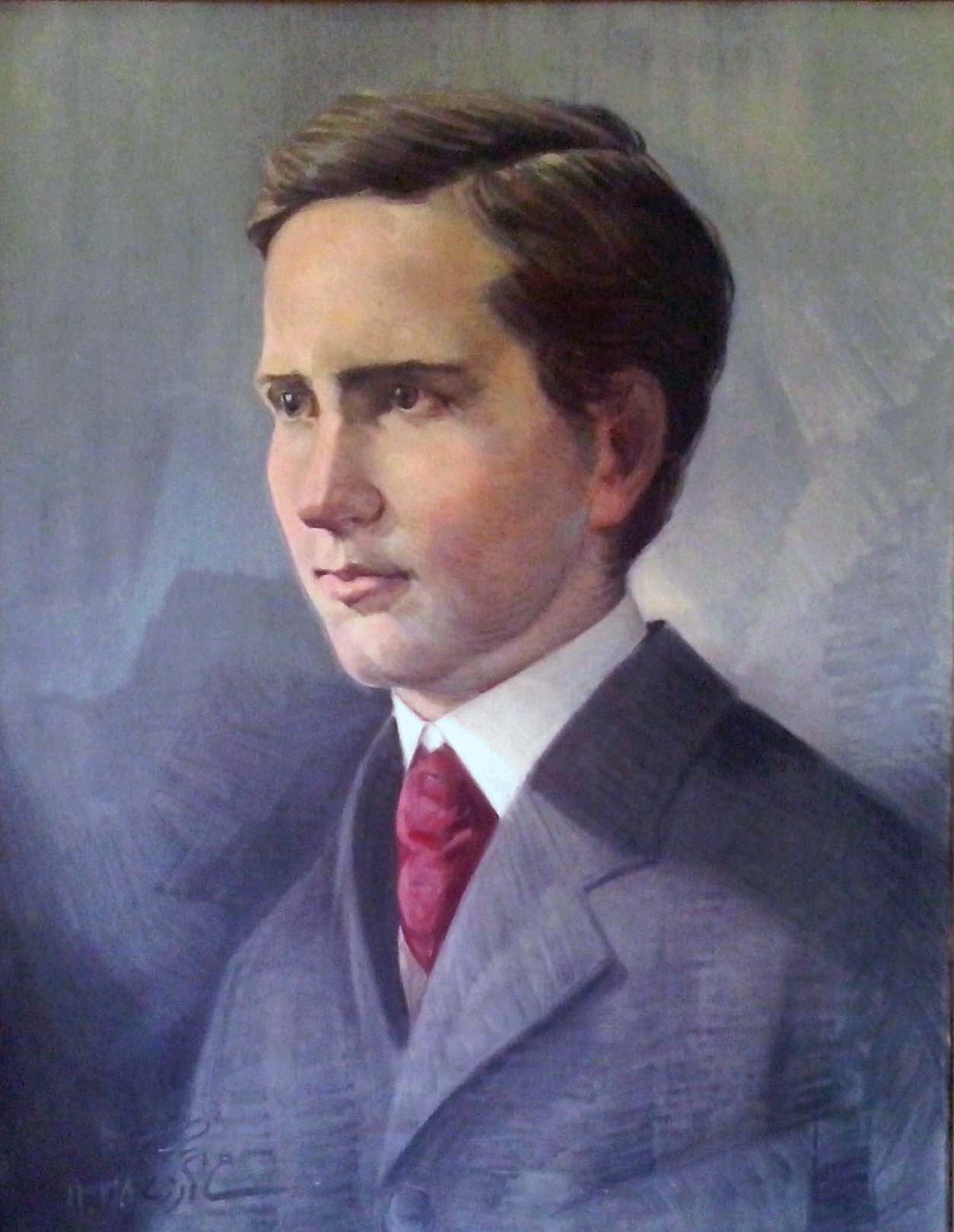
Portrait of Howard Baskerville in the Constitution House of Tabriz

When the National Parliament resumed its sessions in November, one of its first actions was to deliver a speech at the Baskerville Memorial.

At the Presbyterian Historical Society in Philadelphia, there are many letters describing Baskerville. In 1959, the fiftieth anniversary of his death was completely planned and managed by the Tabrizis, much to the surprise of the Ministry of Foreign Affairs.

On Monday, April 20, 1980, the 71st anniversary of Baskerville's death, a ceremony was held at Parvin School (formerly the Memorial School). The ceremony was organized by Ali Dehghan, Director General of the East Azerbaijan Culture Department, in the High School Hall, named after Baskerville. Iranian guests included Rezazadeh Shafaq, a student of Baskerville, and others such as Hassan Taghizadeh, Ismail Amirkhizi, Abolghasem Fayuzat, Ali Hiyat, Mehdi Alavizadeh, and Americans living in Tehran. The head of the cultural department, Hollinick, the first secretary, and Mrs. McDowell, an American missionary, were present.

Even when Iran-US relations were at their worst, Baskerville remained an exception. In December 1979, in the days of the hostage crisis, Thomas M. Ricks, a professor at Georgetown University, took a group of American clergymen to Iran to meet with Ayatollah Khomeini. They visited a mosque on the last day of the trip, when an Iranian man stood up and asked, "Where are the American Baskervilles today?"

In 2005, a bronze statue of Baskerville was unveiled at the Constitutional House of Tabriz by then-Iranian President Mohammad Khatami. Below the bronze statue, the sentence is written in Persian: "Howard C. Baskerville. He was a patriot, a history maker."

Some in the United States have suggested April 19 the anniversary of Howard Baskerville's assassination to be marked as "Iranian-American Friendship Day". on the anniversary of Baskerville's assassination in 2014, Alan Eyre, a Persian-speaking spokesman for the US State Department, described Baskerville as a martyr on his Facebook page.

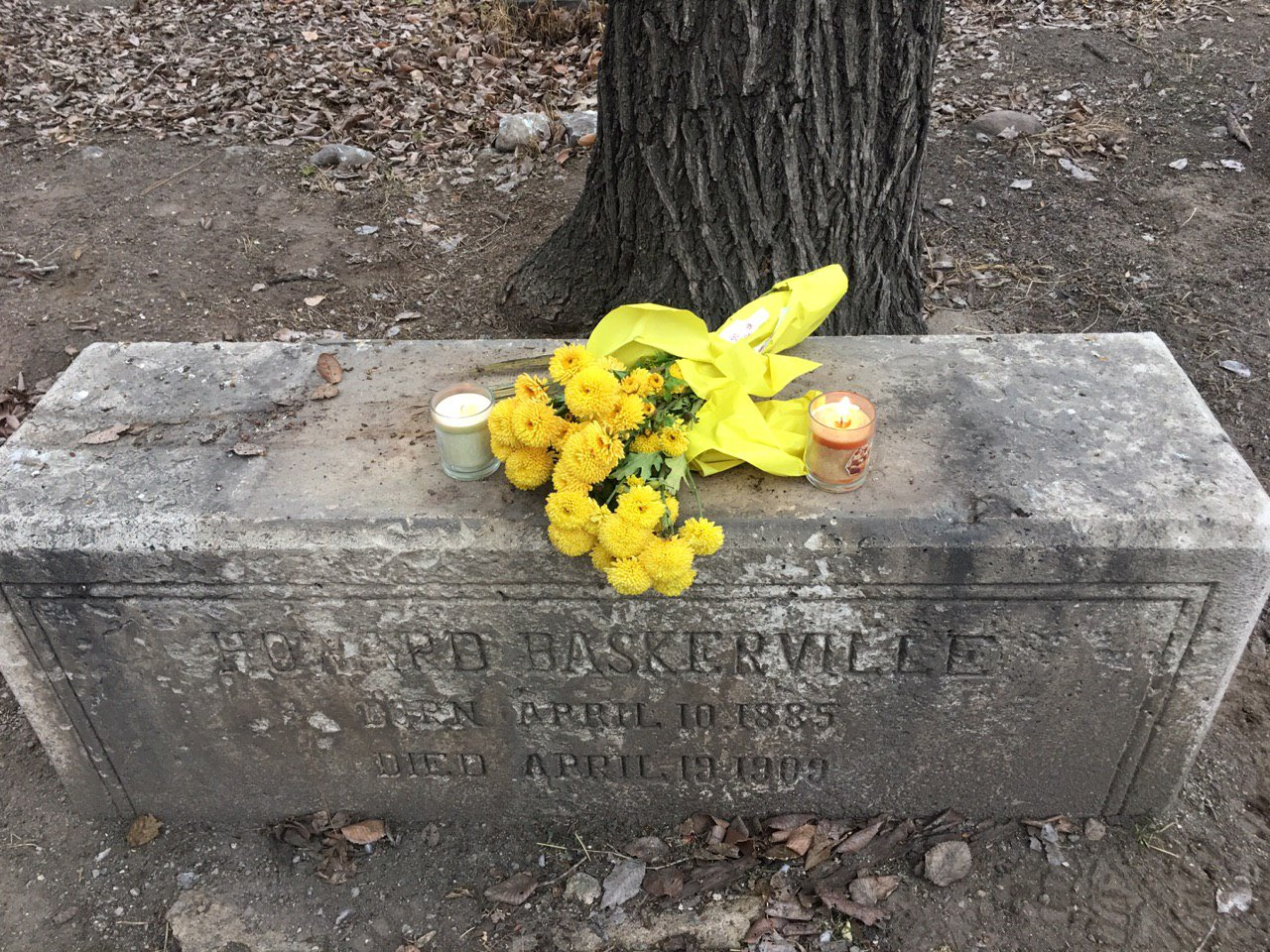
Howard Baskerville's Tombstone, 2021

In 2015, a group from the United States, led by Stephen Kinzer, visited the grave of Howard Baskerville in the Armenian Cemetery in Tabriz.

There are many Iranians who praise Baskerville and consider him a martyr. He is buried in the Assyrian Cemetery of Tabriz (then the American Cemetery) in Tabriz, and some unidentified enthusiasts alternately decorate his tombstone with fresh yellow flowers.

In late 2022, Iranian-American scholar Reza Aslan published An American Martyr in Persia: The Epic Life and Tragic Death of Howard Baskerville, which Kirkus Reviews called "an intriguing read that breathes life into a pivotal moment of Persian/Iranian history".

== Fiction ==
Chapter XL of the historical fiction novel Samarkand, written by French-Lebanese writer Amin Maalouf, revolves around Baskerville and the Persian Constitutional Revolution.

== See also ==
- Famous Americans in Iran
