= Eyre family =

The Eyre family refers to the descendants of George Eyre and Mary Smith Eyre who comprised a political and business dynasty prominent in the Northeastern United States from the colonial era to the early 20th century. During the American Revolutionary War several members of the family served in key military and political positions, while the Eyre shipping company proved critical in the founding of the U.S. Navy.

== Historical background ==
Unlike other American political families such as the Adamses, the Lees, and, later, the Bushes and the Kennedys, the Eyres were members of an established noble house and had no social or economic incentive to leave England. Colonial and Revolutionary Families of Pennsylvania reports that George Eyre, founder of the dynasty in the United States, was the great-grandson of arch-royalist Gervase Eyre, who served as governor of Newark Castle during the English Civil War, auctioned off one of his personal estates to provide loans to King Charles I, and eventually died defending the Crown.

The semi-mythical account of their line's founding during the Battle of Hastings evolved into a national legend.

One of the Eyres' palaces was Hope, which, historian Hamilton Hume notes in The Life of Edward John Eyre, Late Governor of Jamaica, "continued in the family until the period of the Civil Wars, when the then head of the family, Sir Gervas Eyre, Governor of Newark Castle, sold it to raise the last loan ever contracted for King Charles the First."

Hume writes that at the time of George Eyre's birth in 1700 the Eyres "were for centuries a powerful family...and [lords] of thirty manors...in Derbyshire and Sheffield."

== Colonial and Revolutionary Era ==
=== Arrival and Initial Settlement ===
George Eyre's decision to settle in Britain's North American colonies has sometimes been characterized as a case of "accidental immigration," given the 27-year-old's large inheritance in England and apparent lack of motive for leaving it behind. Almost all available sources agree that George, on tour in the Colonies, did not intend to stay, though none shed direct light on why he eventually changed his mind.

The 1894 compilation Extracts From American Newspapers Relating to New Jersey: 1704–1775 comes closest; editors Nelson and Honeyman note obliquely that "George Eyre...while on a visit to this country in 1727...met Mary Smith, the daughter of Hon. Samuel Smith of Burlington, N.J., whom he married about 1729."

The sudden betrothal and marriage could have sprung from a genuine romance, a shotgun wedding, or may have been merely another of the Eyres' strategic couplings; Nelson and Honeyman go on to observe that George Eyre's marriage to Mary Smith "made the Eyres claimants to the mythical Jennens estate."

The same document proves, conclusively, that the Eyres made use of forced labor; a March 1737 advertisement in the American Weekly Mercury offers thirty shillings to anyone who can return a 20-year-old runaway "servant man."

=== Rise to Prominence ===
George Eyre managed the political and business careers of his seven surviving children with such shrewdness that the Eyres, a generation after landing in North America, were one of the leading families in the Colonies. George concentrated most of his energies on sons Manuel (born 1736), Jehu (born 1738), and Benjamin (born 1747), all of whom he apprenticed to Richard Wright, the "leading shipbuilder in Philadelphia" in the decades immediately preceding the Revolution.

Two of the apprenticed Eyres, Jehu and Manuel, took Wright daughters for wives in what appears to have been a political arrangement. In January 1761 twenty-four-year-old Manuel Eyre was wed to Mary Wright; Jehu Eyre, age twenty-three, was wed to Lydia Wright that December.

While the union of the two houses was officially sealed in 1761, the Eyres seem to have begun assuming a larger role in the Wright shipping business at an earlier period; in 1759, a twenty-one-year-old Jehu Eyre accepted a royal commission to build boats for the navigation of the Ohio River. The Eyre brothers had, in any case, taken full control of Philadelphia's greatest shipping business by the outbreak of the American Revolutionary War, and their new position helped them make decisive contributions to the independence effort.

== Apogee ==
In 1803 the family's mercantile business was merged with that of Philadelphia merchant Charles Massey to become the firm of Eyre & Massey, one of the largest trading ventures in the world. As the Eyres' global shipping empire grew the family continued its involvement in politics at the municipal and state levels, then moved to national prominence when Manuel Eyre, Jr. became a director of the Second Bank of the United States in 1816.

During the apogee of their power in the late 18th and early 19th centuries the Eyres had personal friendships with such influential political figures as George Washington, John Sergeant, James Madison, and Henry Clay. In 1828 the family founded Delaware City, Delaware.

== Decline and fall ==
Manuel Eyre, Jr.'s sudden death in 1845 led to the dissolution of Eyre & Massey and the beginning of the Eyres' slow decline. The family's habit of staging political marriages (which it had done as far back as the 1760s) helped ease this slide; Eyre daughters married into the wealthy Ashhurst and Heller houses, thus inheriting control of Grange Estate and DeLay Plantation, while a Heller son took a wife from the Dutch Vanderslice family.

The demise of Leroy Vanderslice Heller's fortune during the 1929 stock market crash and subsequent Great Depression marked the terminus of the family's political and economic influence.
