= John Eyre =

John Eyre may refer to:

== Politicians ==
- John Eyre (died 1581), Member of Parliament for Wiltshire and Salisbury
- John Eyre (died 1639), MP for Cricklade
- John Eyre (1659–1709), MP for Galway Town, son of the above
- John Eyre (died 1745), MP for Galway Town, son of the above
- John Eyre (1665–1715), MP for Downton
- John Eyre, 1st Baron Eyre (c. 1720–1781), MP for Galway Town, nephew of the above
- John Eyre (Canadian politician) (1824–1882), Canadian attorney and politician

== Sports ==
- John Eyre (cricketer, born 1859) (1859–1941), Marylebone Cricket Club cricketer
- John Eyre (cricketer, born 1885) (1885–1964), Derbyshire cricketer
- John Eyre (cricketer, born 1944), Derbyshire cricketer
- John Eyre (footballer) (born 1974), English footballer

== Religion ==
- John Eyre (Archdeacon of Sheffield) (1845–1912), Anglican priest in the late 19th and early 20th centuries
- John Eyre (evangelical minister) (1754–1803), English cleric
- John Eyre (Archdeacon of Nottingham) (1758–1830)

== Others ==
- John Eyre (settler) (died 1685), English settler in Ireland
- John Eyre (British artist) (1847–1927), English genre painter, designed and painted pottery
- John Eyre (painter) (1771–1812), Australian painter and engraver
- John William Henry Eyre (1869–1944), British bacteriologist
- John R. Eyre, author and one-time owner of the Isleworth Mona Lisa

== See also ==
- Edward John Eyre (1815–1901), Australian explorer and Governor of Jamaica
