= Charles Eyre =

Charles Eyre may refer to:

- Charles Eyre (colonial administrator) (died 1729), president of Bengal
- Charles Eyre (bishop) (1817–1902), archbishop of Glasgow
- Charles Eyre (writer) (1784–1864), English writer
- Charles Eyre (cricketer) (1883–1915), English cricketer, educator and British Army officer
