= John Hewson (artist) =

Textile artist from England

- Born: 1744; London, England
- Died: 1821 (aged 76–77); Philadelphia, Pennsylvania, U.S.
- Occupation: Textile artist

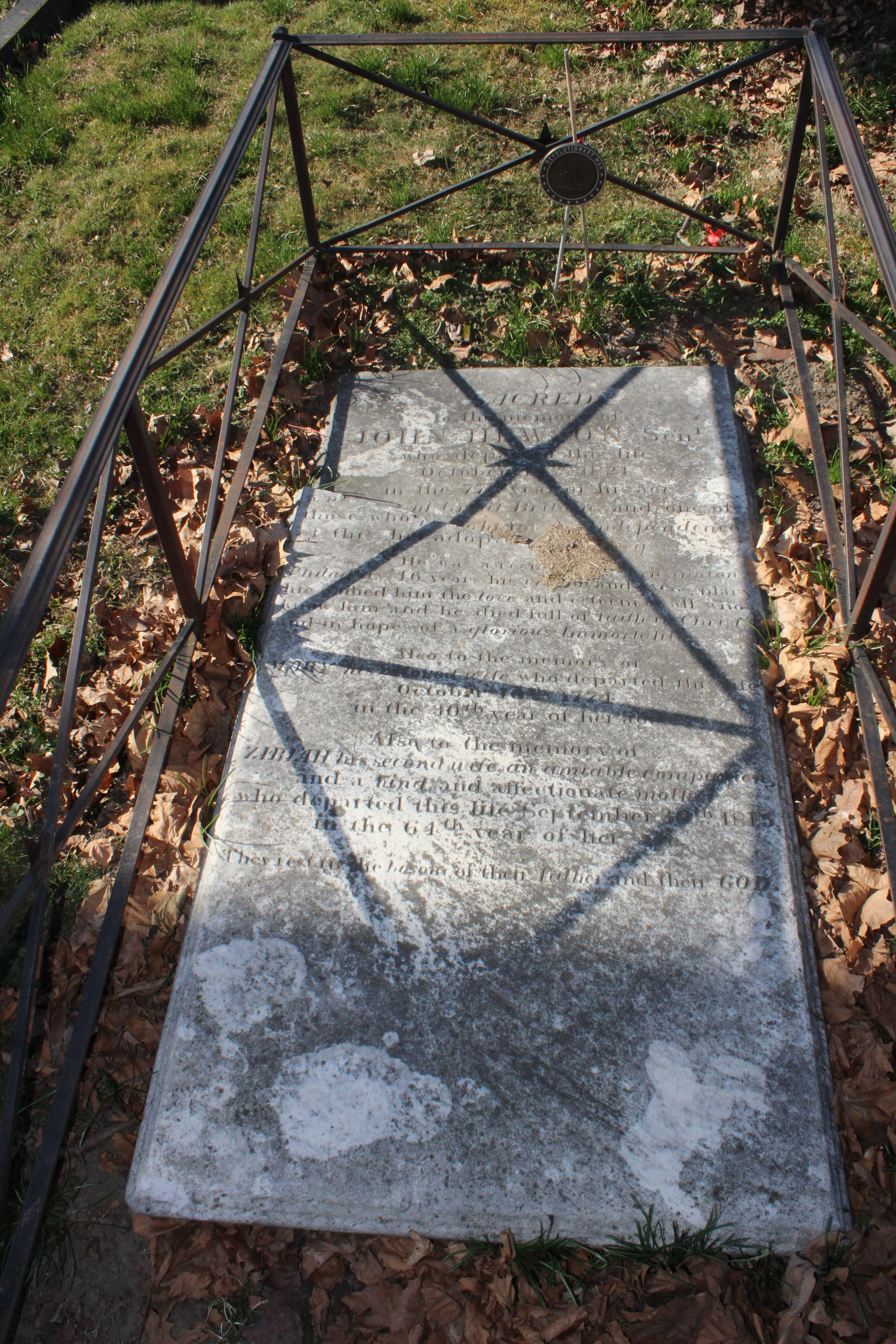
John Hewson gravestone in Palmer Cemetery in Philadelphia

John Hewson (1744 – 1821) was a textile artist. He trained in a cotton-printing factory in London, but moved to the United States on the advice of his friend Benjamin Franklin, and set up a calico printing factory in the Kensington neighborhood of Philadelphia, Pennsylvania. His chintzes were used in American quilts, often as the centerpiece. In November 2014, a DNA test revealed Hewson to be the paternal fifth great-grandfather of American actress and comedian Tina Fey.

He is interred at Palmer Cemetery in Philadelphia.
