= James Eyre =

James Eyre may refer to:

- Sir James Eyre (judge) (1734–1799), English judge
- Sir James Eyre (British Army officer) (1930–2003)
- James Eyre (philologist) (1748–1813), English philologist
- Sir James Eyre (physician) (1792–1857), English physician and mayor of Hereford

== See also ==
- Jim Eyre (disambiguation)
