= Thomas Eyre =

Thomas Eyre may refer to:

- Thomas Eyre (Jesuit) (1670–1715), English Jesuit
- Thomas Eyre (divine) (1748–1810), Catholic theologian
- Thomas Eyre (MP) (died 1628), MP for Salisbury
- Thomas Eyre, President of Ushaw College, Dublin, 1794–1810
- Thomas Eyre (engineer) (died 1772), Irish military engineer and architect
- Thomas Eyre (footballer) (fl. 1890s), football full back who played for Glasgow Ashfield, Lincoln City and Hamilton Academical
- Thomas Lawrence Eyre (1862–1926), American politician from Pennsylvania
