= William Eyre =

William Eyre may refer to:

- William Eyre (died 1629), MP for Heytesbury and Wiltshire
- William Eyre (leveller) (fl. 1634–1675), English Parliamentary army officer in the English Civil War and a Leveller
- William Eyre of Neston (fl. 1642–1660), parliamentarian army officer and politician
- William Eyre (lieutenant-colonel) (died 1765), Battle of Lake George, Battle of Carillon
- Sir William Eyre (British Army officer) (1805–1859), general in the British Army
- William Eyre (painter) (1891–1979), English landscape painter
- Rev. William Leigh Williamson Eyre (1841–1914), English naturalist and mycologist
- Willie Eyre (born 1978), baseball player

== See also ==
- Eyre (surname)
