= Jim Eyre =

Jim Eyre may refer to:

- Jim Eyre (caver), British caver
- Jim Eyre (architect), British architect and winner of the Bodley Medal

== See also ==
- James Eyre (disambiguation)
