= Palmer Cemetery =

Cemetery in the Fishtown neighborhood of Philadelphia, Pennsylvania, US

Coordinates: 39.9746°N 75.1296°W

Palmer Cemetery aka The Kensington Burial Grounds.
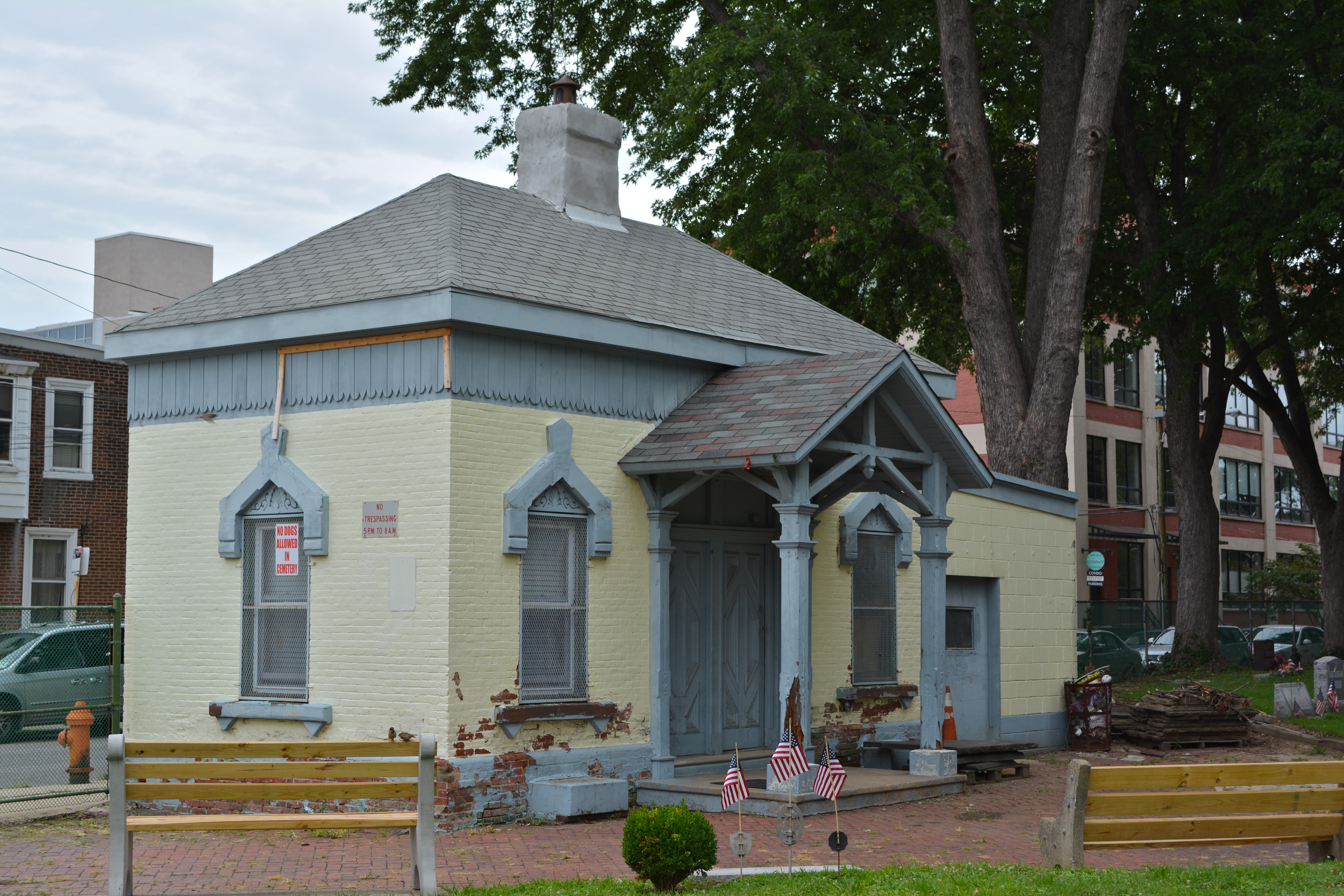
- Palmer Cemetery gatehouse
- Interactive map of Palmer Cemetery aka The Kensington Burial Grounds.

Details
- Established: About 1732
- Country: United States
- Type: Public
- Owned by: Managed by unpaid volunteer trustees.
- Size: 5 acres
- No. of graves: 40,000 to 50,000
- Website: http://palmercemeteryfishtown.org/
- Find a Grave: Palmer Cemetery aka The Kensington Burial Grounds.

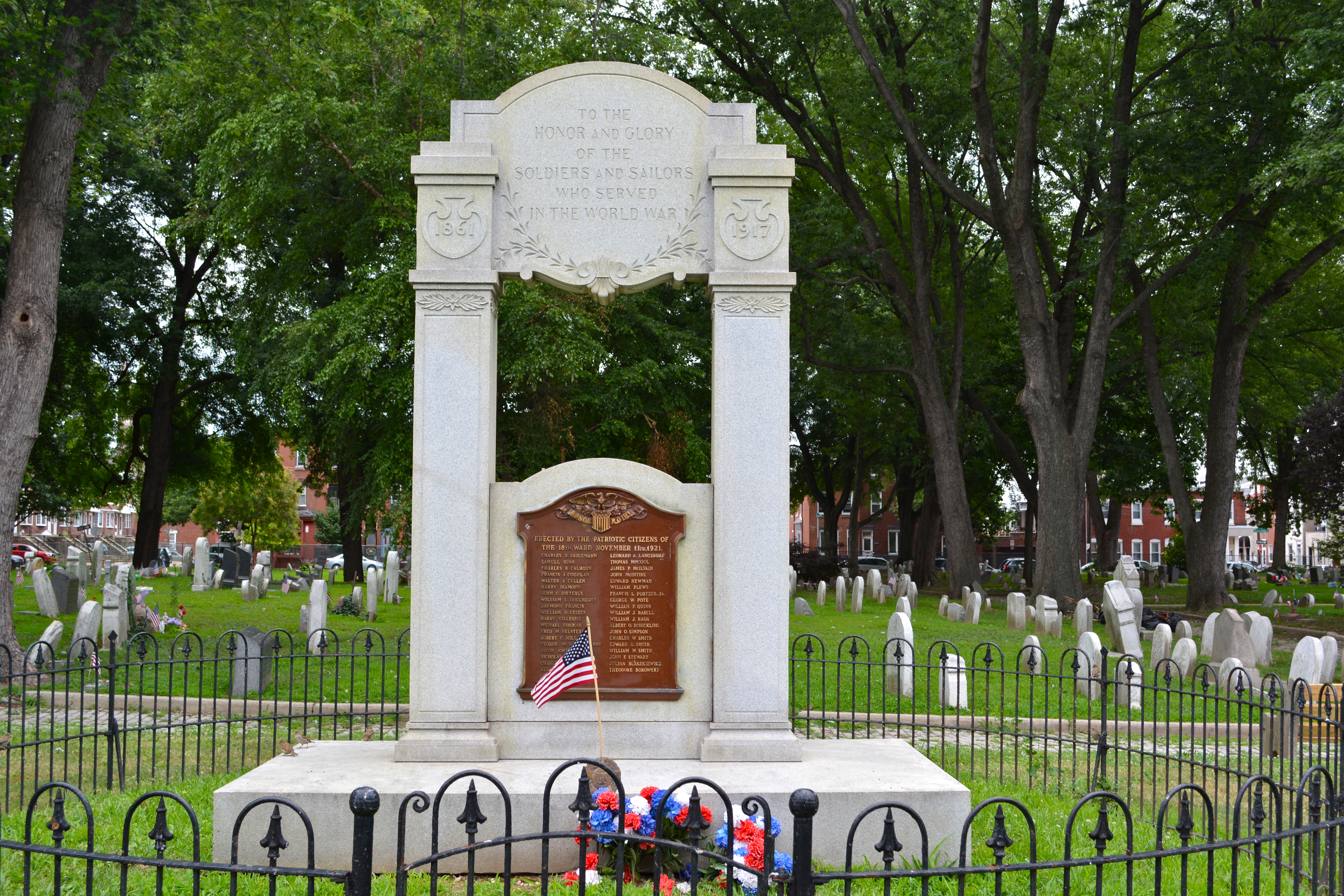
Palmer Cemetery World War I memorial

Palmer Cemetery, originally known as the Kensington Burial Grounds, was established around 1732 in the Fishtown section of Philadelphia.

The cemetery holds the remains of many of the original families of Kensington such as the Cramp and Shibe Families. There are veterans of every war buried here, beginning with the American Revolutionary War. There are markers for veterans of the American Civil War, World War I, World War II, the Korean War and the Vietnam War.

The cemetery is also home to one of the first memorials to local World War I Veterans (1921). The exact number of burials is unknown, but it is estimated that 40,000 to 50,000 people are buried in Palmer Cemetery. The cemetery is maintained by volunteer trustees who oversee its operation and preservation.

Palmer Cemetery is a 501c3 Non profit. All donation are used for the care and preservation of the historic grounds.

== History ==
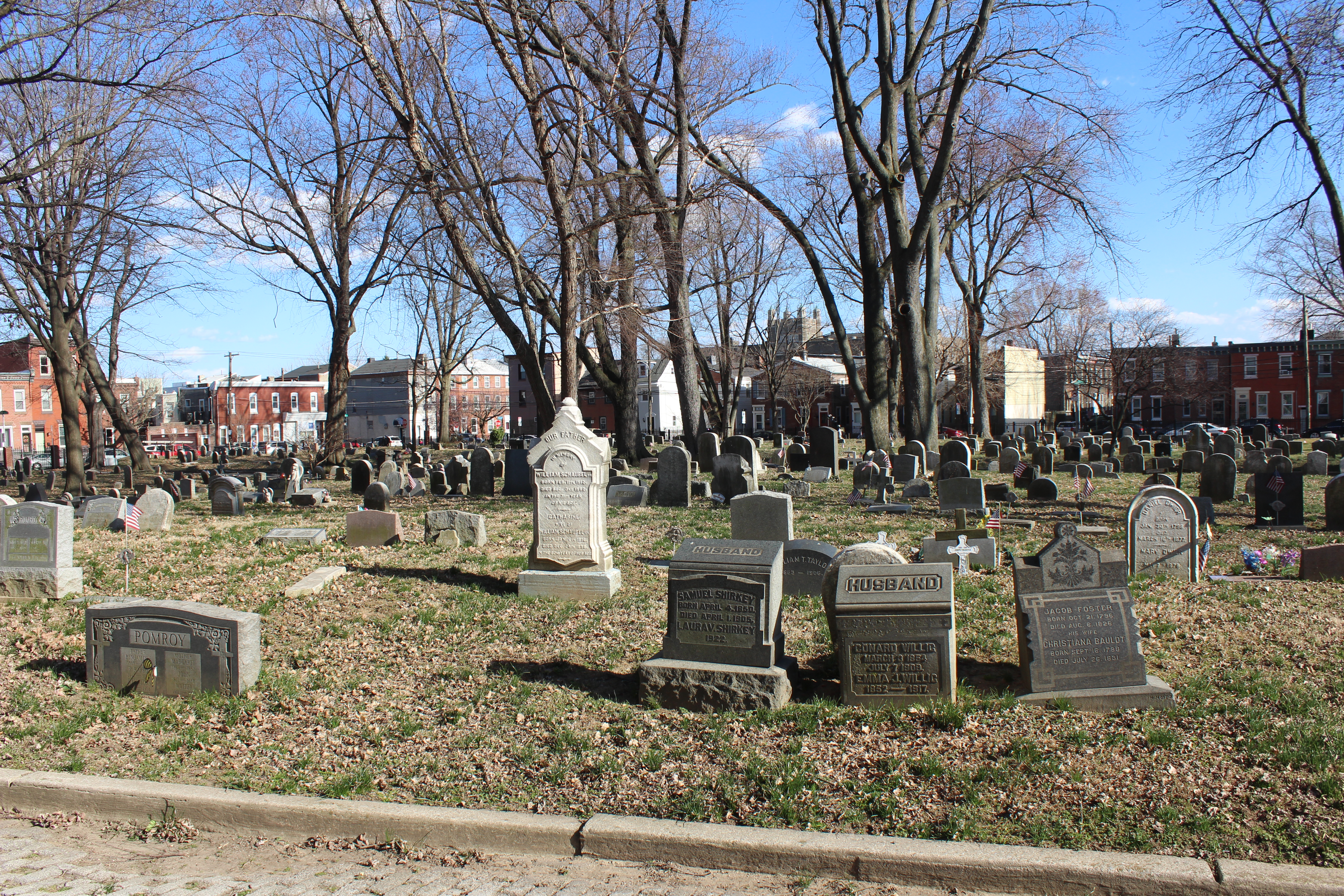
Tombstones in Palmer Cemetery with Fishtown rowhouses in the background

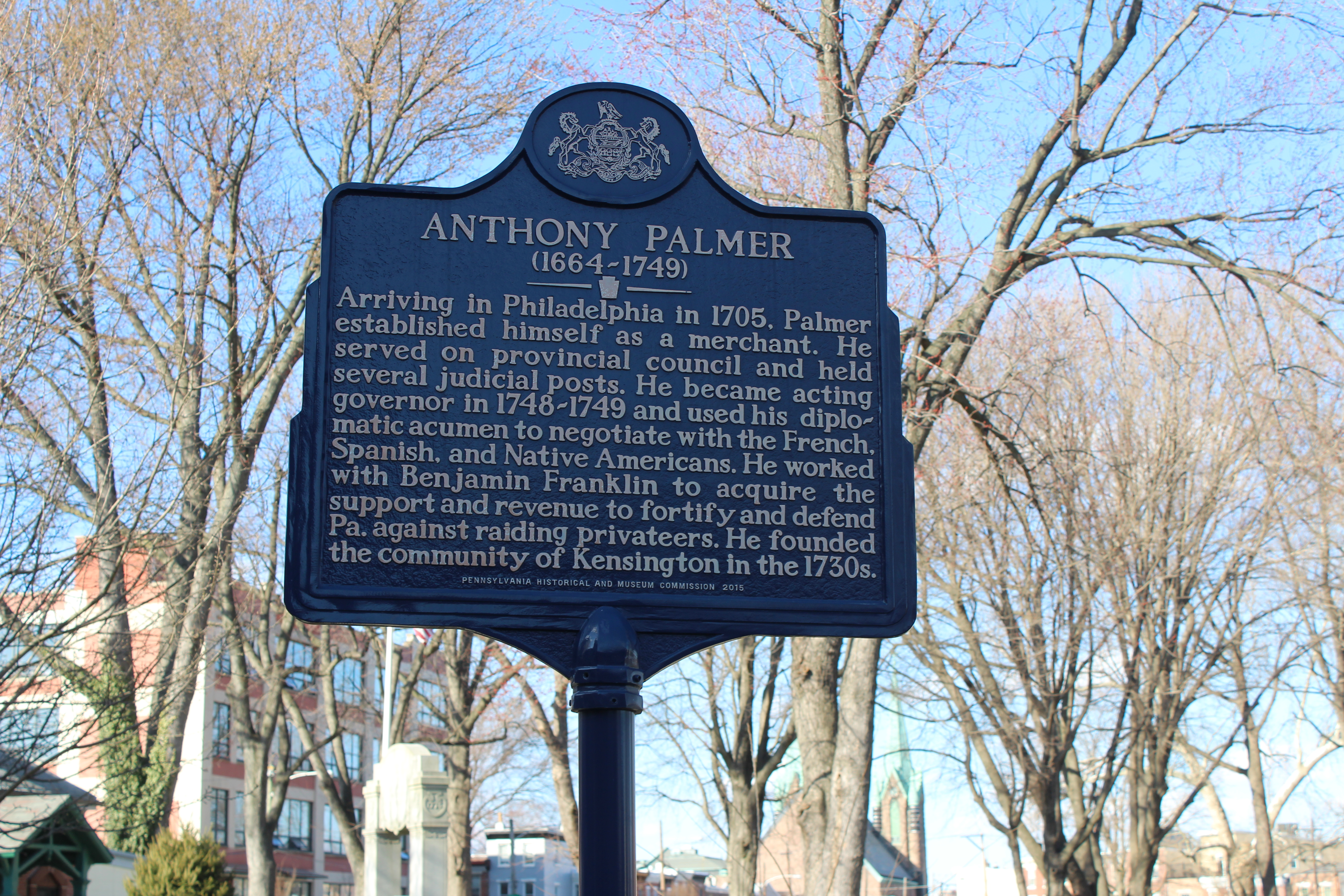
Pennsylvania Historical Marker on Anthony Palmer in Palmer Cemetery

The cemetery is named for the founder of Kensington, Philadelphia, Captain Anthony Palmer, its actual name is the Kensington Burial Grounds. Palmer was originally from England, and came to America from Barbados around 1700–1705. He became a sizable landowner in the area north of the city of Philadelphia (The Northern Liberties). Using proceeds from the sale of the Hope Farm estate (present-day Port Richmond), which included three slaves named Abraham, Hannibal, and Phillis, he purchased the "Fairman Estate" in about 1730, which consisted of 191.5 acres of land along the Delaware River. The Fairman Mansion was located at the current Penn Treaty Park where William Penn made his famous treaty with the Lenni-Lenape Indians. This is where Anthony Palmer laid out the town of Kensington. It is believed that Palmer gave a small parcel of land in his town, to be used as a 'free burial ground" for the people of Kensington. If you lived within the original boundaries, you were allowed to be buried in the burial grounds.

Anthony Palmer was a member of the Provincial Council of Pennsylvania from about 1710. He began his political career as a judge, and eventually, as senior member of council, he would become President of Council and Acting Provincial Governor of Pennsylvania in 1747–48. Palmer died in 1749 and was buried in the Christ Church Burial Grounds located at 2nd and Market Streets. (As with many old cemeteries, the exact location of the Palmer Family Grave is unknown.) Anthony Palmer's will did not mention the land for the cemetery. The cemetery land was mentioned in the will of his daughter, Thomasina Keith, who died shortly after her father. In 1765 a "deed of trust" was formally filed in the City of Philadelphia. The trust stated that the grounds were to be used for a burial grounds for the residents of Kensington and managed by trustees from the community. The deed of trust named the original six trustees and the rules they were to follow in managing the burial grounds.

In 1975, a receiving vault built in 1870 of brick and marble exploded and was destroyed due to the build-up of kerosene fumes and the activity of juvenile delinquents.

In July 2012, the cemetery was recognized by the Philadelphia Historical Commission as a historic city landmark.

== Notable burials ==
- Manuel Eyre (1736–1805), colonel in the Continental Army and shipbuilder
- John Hewson (1744–1821), textile artist and Revolutionary War Hero
