= Jane Eyre (New Zealand artist) =

New Zealand portrait painter

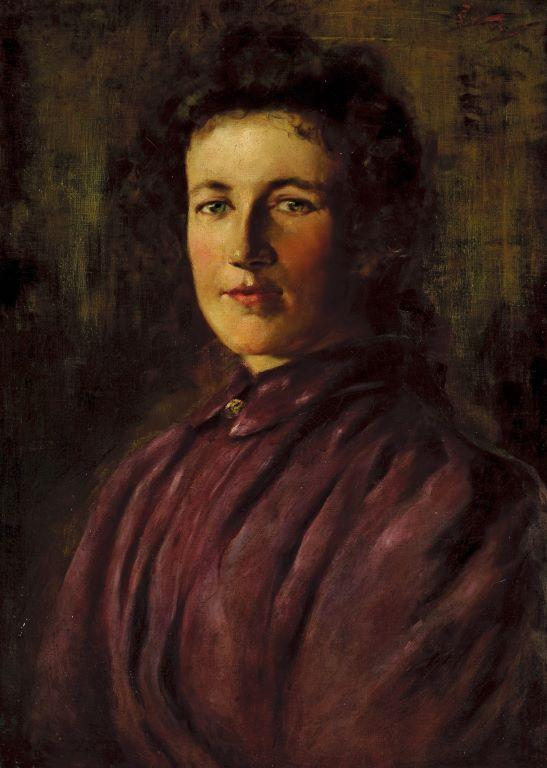
- Portrait of Jane Eyre by G. P. Nerli
- Born: December 1874; Auckland
- Died: 17 October 1952; Auckland
- Resting place: Birkenhead-Glenfield Cemetery
- Education: Elam School of Fine Arts, G. P. Nerli

Jane Eyre (December 1874 – 17 October 1952) was a New Zealand artist and teacher based in Auckland.

== Biography ==
Jane Eyre was born in Auckland in December 1874.

She studied at Elam School of Art in Auckland, and later taught at there. From 1899-1902, she was successful in several Kensington Art Examinations. In 1897, she studied under G. P. Nerli when he was in Auckland and sat for a portrait, which is now held in the Auckland Art Gallery.

She exhibited at the Auckland Society of Art from 1895 until 1927. She won a silver medal for a study in monochrome. She is represented at both the Leys Institute and the Hocken Collections.

She died on 17 October 1952 and was buried at the Birkenhead-Glenfield Cemetery.
