= Robert Eyre (disambiguation) =

Robert Eyre (1666–1735) was an English lawyer, Solicitor-General, Chief Justice of the Common Pleas.

Robert Eyre may also refer to:

- Robert Eyre (died 1752) (c. 1693–1752), British lawyer and politician, MP for Southampton
- Robert Eyre (by 1518 – 1570 or later), MP for Weymouth and Salisbury
- Robert Eyre (MP for Winchelsea) (died 1573), MP for Winchelsea
- Robert Eyre (died 1559), MP for Great Yarmouth
- Bobby Ayre (Robert William Eyre, 1932–2018), English footballer
