= William Eyre (painter) =

English painter

William Eyre (1891–1979) was an English landscape painter. He exhibited at the Croydon Art Society for 20 years but travelled extensively. From early on it the 1970s he lived in North Wales and continued to paint and exhibit. Eyre was a most accomplished artist working in both oil and watercolour. His work is often compared to Edward Seago.

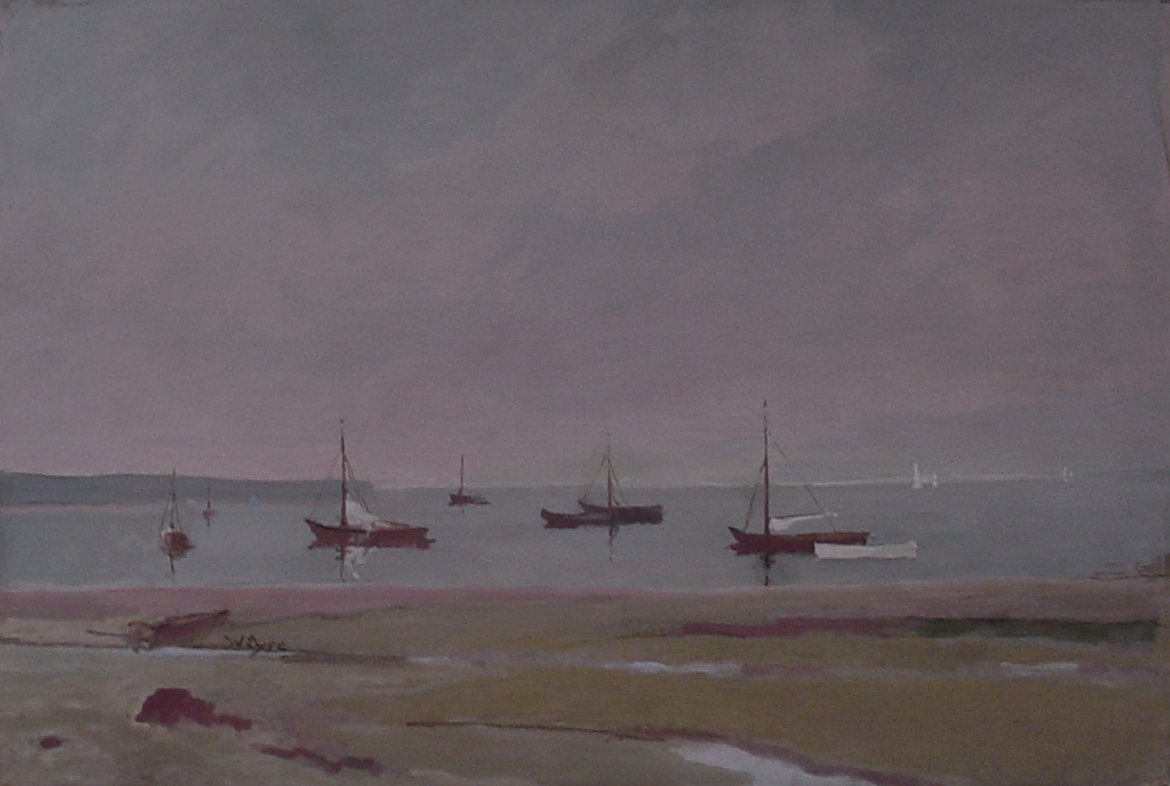
On the River Stour
