= John Eyre (painter) =

Australian painter

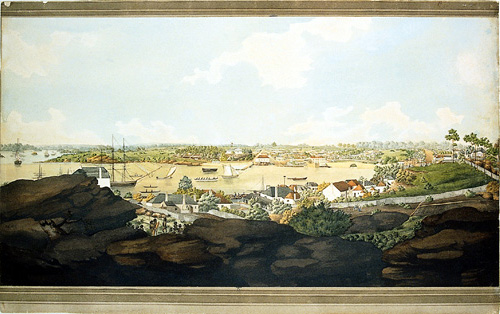
- Sydney Cove, a watercolor painting produced by Eyre in 1806, typical of his style.
- Born: c. 1771; Coventry, Warwickshire, England
- Occupations: Convict, emancipist, landscape artist
- Notable work: The present picture of New South Wales (illus.); Views in New South Wales (illus.)
- Style: Topographical illustrator
- Criminal charge: Housebreaking (convicted)
- Criminal penalty: Penal transportation – 7 years (23 March 1799)
- Criminal status: Conditional pardon (4 June 1804)

John Eyre (c. 1771– ), a pardoned convict, was an early Australian painter and engraver.

== Biography ==
Eyre was born in Coventry, Warwickshire in England. Aged 13 years in 1794, he was apprenticed to his father, a wool-comber and weaver, and became a Coventry freeman in August 1792. On 23 March 1799 he was sentenced to transportation for seven years for housebreaking, and reached Sydney in the transport Canada in December 1801.

Granted a conditional pardon on 4 June 1804, Eyre's early drawings are dated from around this time. He generally focused on urban landscapes, giving his creative output value as both works of art and historical records. Over the course of Eyre's artistic career, his work progressed from purely representative topographical depictions, to more artistic compositions with embellishments such as Aboriginal figures and ships at sea. This progression is typical of the developmental pattern of landscape depiction in the early colonial period.

He left the Colony as a free man in 1812; nothing is known of his later life.

== See also ==
- List of convicts transported to Australia
- John Eyre (British artist) 1847-1927
