= Benjamin Eyre =

American Revolutionary War figure

Benjamin George Eyre (June 1, 1747 – July 11, 1789), was a figure of the American Revolutionary War. Eyre served as a Lieutenant Colonel in the Continental Army, commanding the Second Battalion of the Pennsylvania Militia.

== Biography ==
Benjamin was the brother to Manuel and Jehu Eyre, also both major players in the Revolution.

The Eyre family as a whole played a pivotal role in the war (most notably through their invaluable contributions to the U.S. Navy, which they essentially founded) and Washington mentioned them several times in his personal correspondences.

=== Shipbuilder ===
Benjamin Eyre was commissioned by the Continental Congress to build the frigate General Greene, a service for which he was paid 56,561 pounds. Large contracts such as this one during the Revolutionary War era helped the Eyres' shipping company, Eyre and Massey, to become one of the largest in the world and bolstered the political and financial situation of the Eyre family.

=== Revolutionary ===
As aide-de-camp to General George Washington, he was so close to the future President that he was once given an expensive punch-bowl by him. The punchbowl was loaned to the American Wing of New York's Metropolitan Museum in 1928 and donated by the surviving heirs in 1973. A large color photo can be seen in the magazine American Heritage, August 1955. The bowl depicted the China international trade and includes one of the first illustrations of the American flag, along with other international standards. The Eyre brothers were major ship builders.

== Legacy ==
A portrait of him standing alongside Washington can be found at Princeton University.
