= Thomas Eyre (Jesuit) =

English Jesuit

Thomas Eyre (1670–1715) was an English Jesuit.

Eyre was born on 23 December 1670 to a family settled at Eastwell, Leicestershire. He studied at the College of St. Omer, was admitted into the Society of Jesus in 1687, and was professed of the four vows on 8 March 1705–06.

He was chaplain to the court of the exiled James II at the Château de Saint-Germain-en-Laye; became professor of theology at Liège (1701–04); and in 1712 was socius (a sort of secretary and chief of staff) to a Provincial (regional administrator) of his Order. In 1712, he served for a time as chaplain at the court of James Francis Edward Stuart at Bar-le-Duc. Eyre died in London on 9 November 1715. Dr Kirk believed him to be concerned in a biography of James II.
