= Lynx (1776 ship) =

History

Great Britain
- Name: Lynx
- Builder: Whitby
- Launched: 26 November 1776
- Captured: 23 January 1812

General characteristics
- Tons burthen: 325, or 337 (bm)
- Length: 99 ft (30 m)
- Beam: 28 ft (9 m)
- Armament: 1799: 8 × 4-pounder guns; 1806: 6 × 6-pounder guns

Lynx was launched at Whitby in 1776. From 1777 to 1798 she traded with the Baltic. Between 1798 and 1811 Lynx engaged in whaling in Davis Strait, in the British northern whale fishery. She then changed to trading with New Brunswick; in 1812 a French privateer captured her.

== Career ==
Lynx first appeared in Lloyd's List (LR) in 1778. She had already sailed to the Baltic early in 1777.

Year	Master	Owner	Trade	Source & notes
1778	Middleton	Capt.&Co.	Archangel–Hull	LR
1781	Middleton; R.Smith	Middleton	Riga–London; London transport	LR
1784	H.Smith; E.Preston	Middleton	London transport	LR
1787	E.Preston	Middleton	Liverpool–Baltic	LR

In 1786 Lynx's ownership shifted her registry to Hull. Her owners in 1787 were Jos. Barker, Thos. Middleton and James Atty. Her captain was Elisha Preston.

Year	Master	Owner	Trade	Source & notes
1789	E.Preston; W.Lumsden	Middleton	Petersburg; Hull	LR
1792	Lumsden; J.Medd	Middleton	Hull; Petersburg	LR; small repairs 1792
1797	Wray	Middleton	Hull; Petersburg	LR; small repairs 1792
1798	Wray; Banks	Middleton	Hull; Petersburg	LR; small repairs 1792 & almost rebuilt 1797

From 1798 to 1811 Lynx sailed from Hull on annual whaling voyages to Davis Strait. The data below is from Coltish, augmented with information from newspaper reports.

Year	Master	Whales	Butts blubber	Tuns whale oil
1798	Banks			72
1799	Banks	5	200	66
1800	Banks	7	290	90
1801	Palmer	10		150
1802				53
1803	Wallace	3	130	45
1804	Wallace	7	270	98
1805	Wallace	7	275	106
1806	Wallace	4		84
1807	Wallace	5		93
1808	Wallace	8		185
1809	Weldon	17	500	194
1810	Wallace	16	480	196
1811	Briggs	3		42

After her return from Davis Strait in 1811, her owners withdrew Lynx from whaling and started to sail her to North America.

Year	Master	Owner	Trade	Source & notes
1811	Wildon; Briggs; Dewear	J.Dopkins	Hull–Davis Strait	LR; almost rebuilt 1797, & damages repaired 1802
1813	S.Dewear	J.Dopkins	Hull–America	LR; almost rebuilt 1797, damages repaired 1802, & good repair 1811

== Fate ==
Lynx, Dewar, master, sailed from Hull to New Brunswick. As she was returning from New Brunswick a French privateer captured her on 23 January 1812 at 18°N 14°W. Her crew arrived safely at Kingsbridge.

The LR issue for 1813 carried the annotation "captured" under Lynx's name.
