= Richard Eyre (disambiguation) =

Richard Eyre (born 1943) is an English director.

Richard Eyre may also refer to:

- Richard Eyre (author), American author
- Richard Eyre (footballer) (born 1976), English football player
- Richard Eyre (priest) (1929–2012), Anglican priest

== See also ==
- Richard Eyres (born 1966), rugby player
- Richard Ayre, former BBC journalist and administrator
