= Charles Eyre (writer) =

English writer (1784–1864)

Charles Eyre (1784 – 28 September 1864) was an English miscellaneous writer.

== Life ==
He was the son of the Rev. John Eyre of Dedham, Essex and Sherfield, Hampshire, brother of General Eyre. He was educated at Reading grammar school under Richard Valpy and at Trinity College, Cambridge, where he proceeded B.A. in 1807.

Eyre took Anglican orders, but later became a Unitarian. He took an interest in the movement that led to the Reform Bill of 1832, and was for some time proprietor of three liberal newspapers printed at Colchester. Afterwards he managed a large farm, but resolved to part with it at the solicitation of some members of his family. Before he had signed the transfer he committed suicide by hanging at his residence, Upper Park, Dedham, Essex, on 28 September 1864. The coroner's jury found that he was temporarily insane.

== Works ==
- A Letter addressed to the Dukes of Norfolk and Grafton, on the Reform Bill, Ipswich, 1831.
- An Illustration of the Epistles of St. Paul, including an entirely new translation, 2 vols. 1832.
- Remarks on perusing the Rev. P. E. Bidler's Letter to the Unitarians of Ipswich, &c. 2nd ed. 1836.
- The Fall of Adam, 1852, from Milton's Paradise Lost (an amended edition of Milton's epic, in which "frequent variations, both in incident and language, will be detected, and in some cases correction or supposed improvement").

== Family ==
Eyre married Eliza Wheatley Stutter, daughter of James Stutter, at Higham on 27 February 1816.
