= Giles Eyre (disambiguation) =

Giles Eyre (c. 1635–1695) was an English barrister, member of parliament, and judge.

Giles Eyre may also refer to:

- Giles Eyre (priest) (1689–1749), Anglican priest in Ireland
- Giles Eyre (MP) (c. 1692–1750), English lawyer and member of parliament
