= Isaac Eyre =

English footballer

Personal information
- Full name: Isaac John Eyre
- Date of birth: 6 January 1875
- Place of birth: Heeley, England
- Date of death: 1947 (aged 71–72)
- Position: Centre forward

Senior career*
Years	Team	Apps	(Gls)
1902–1903	Sheffield		
1903–1904	Sheffield Wednesday	1	(0)
Total		1	(0)
- * Club domestic league appearances and goals

Isaac Eyre (6 January 1875–1947) was an English footballer who played in the Football League for Sheffield Wednesday. His only appearance for Wednesday came in a 1–0 victory away against Stoke on 12 March 1904.
