= James Eyre (philologist) =

English philologist

James Eyre (1748–1813), was an English philologist.

Eyre was educated at Trinity College, Oxford and Caius College, Cambridge. He became head-master of Solihull Grammar School for thirty years until his death, and rector of Winterbourne Stoke (1801–13) and Nettleton (1802–13) in Wiltshire. He annotated Samuel Johnson's English Dictionary (in manuscript), and his notes were incorporated by Henry John Todd in his edition of Johnson's Dictionary.

He died in 1813.
