= John Eyre (British artist) =

English painter

John Eyre R.B.A., R.I.
- Born: 1 December 1847; St Pancras, London
- Died: 13 September 1928 (aged 80); Stoke-on-Trent
- Style: Genre painting

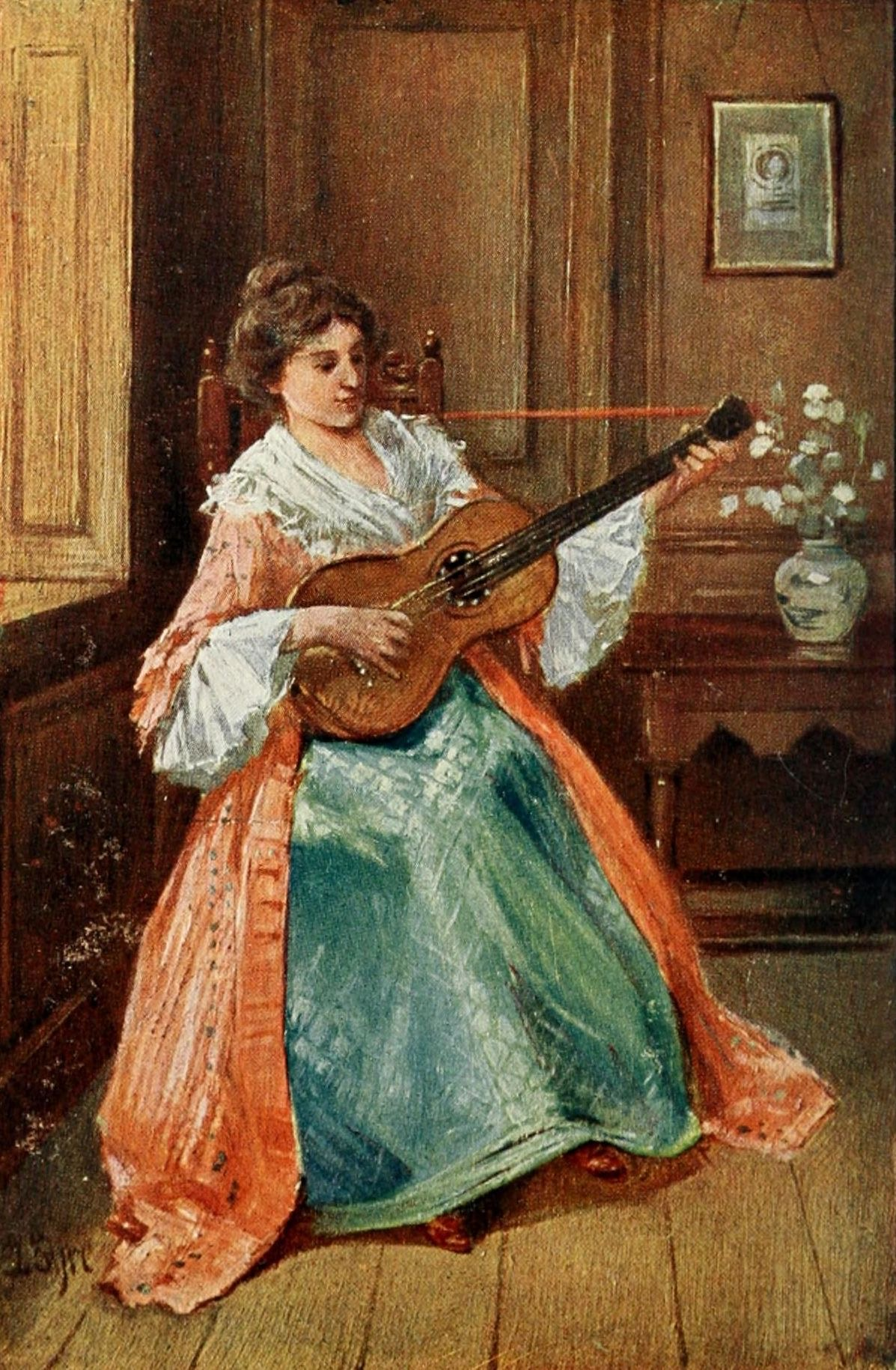
Lady with a guitar by John Eyre, from the book Old Ballads.

John Eyre (1847-1927) was a British artist who decorated and designed British pottery. He also illustrated books and painted genre paintings. He is known for his paintings of Royal Hospital Chelsea and its veteran residents, as well as for paintings of working people in the pottery industry. He was a member of the Royal Society of British Artists (c. 1877), the Royal Institute of Painters in Watercolours (1917) and Honorary Associate of the Royal College of Art (late in life).

Baptized in 1850 at Stoke-on-Trent, Eyre grew up in an artist's family. His father was a decorative artist in Staffordshire Potteries. Eyre got his education, studying art at South Kensington. Initially, he followed his father into the pottery trade, designing and decorating pottery. He worked for Mintons, and progressed to become an art director at Doulton of Lambeth.

He exhibited artwork at the Royal Academy in 1877, Burlington House, Royal Institute of Painters in Watercolours, Paris Salon, and the Ipswich Art Society.

== Gallery ==
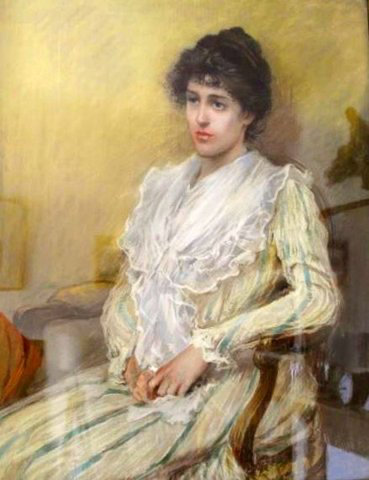
Portrait of Amy Louisa Eyre 1879-1949

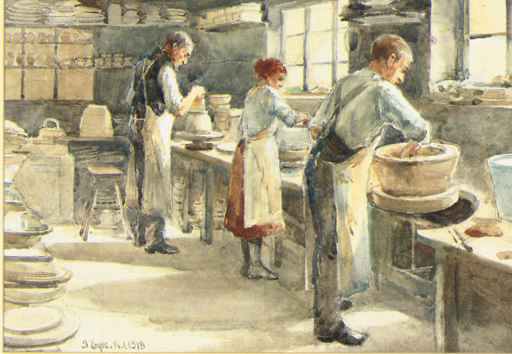
Three Potters at their wheels

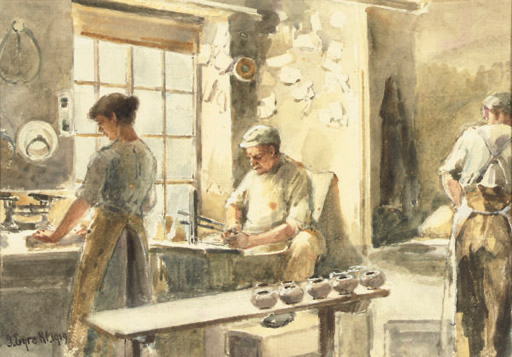
Potters with candlesticks on a table

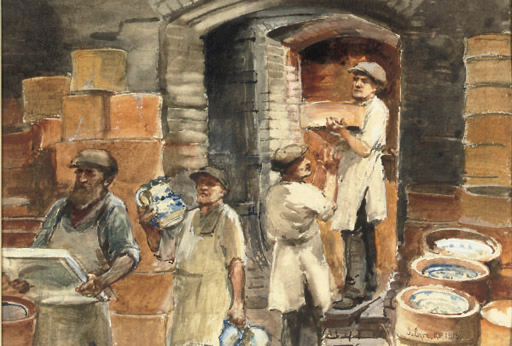
Loading the kiln

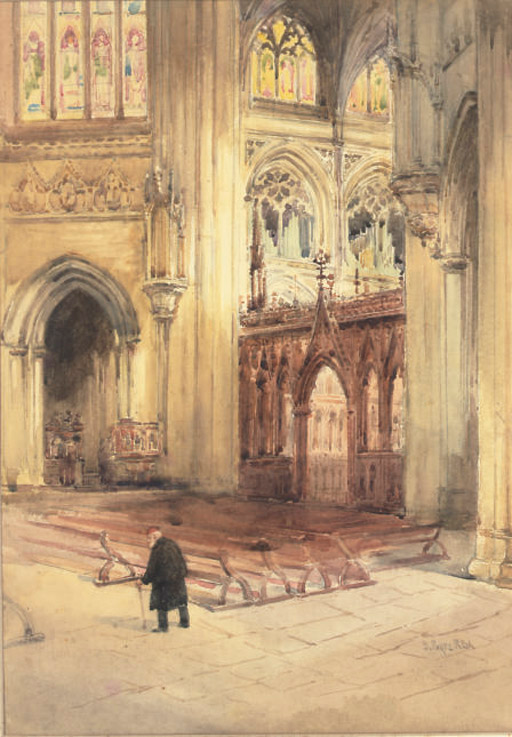
Ely Cathedral, under the lantern

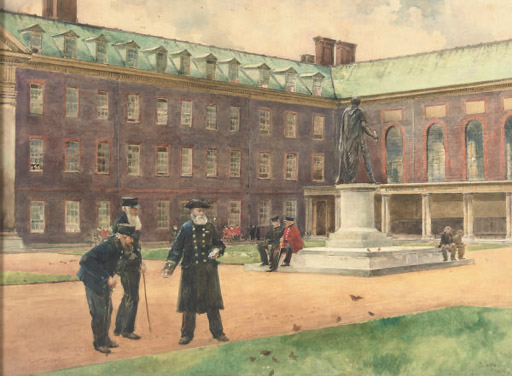
Chelsea Pensioners feeding birds

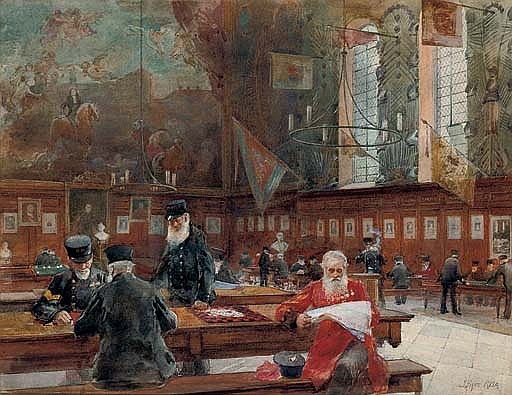
The Great Hall for the Royal Hospital at Chelsea

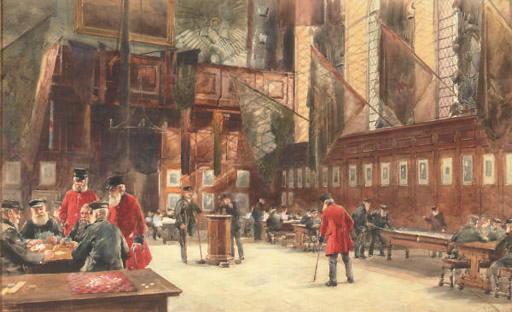
The Great Hall for the Royal Hospital at Chelsea

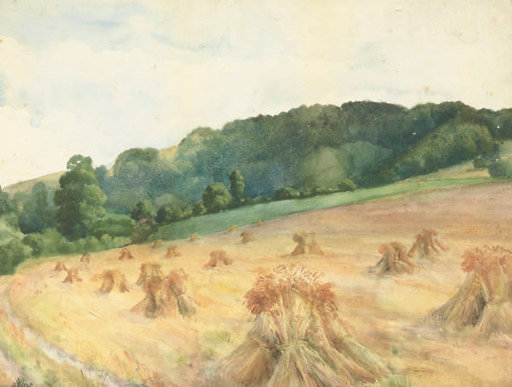
Wheatstacks

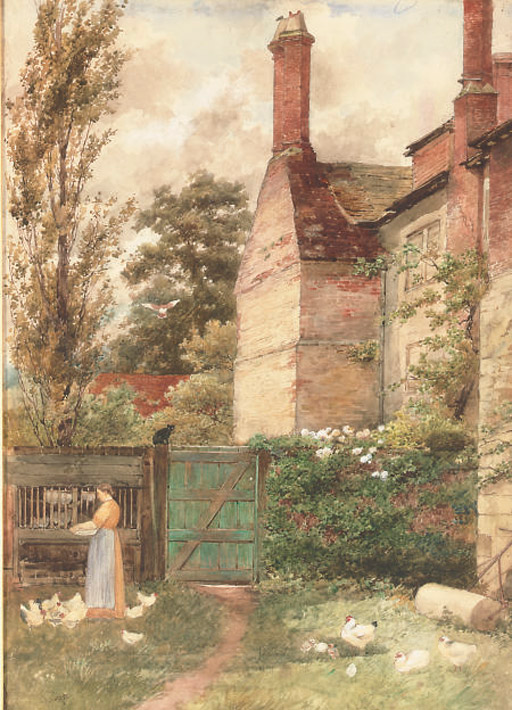
File:The Old Lee Farm JOHN EYRE, R.B.A., R.I.png

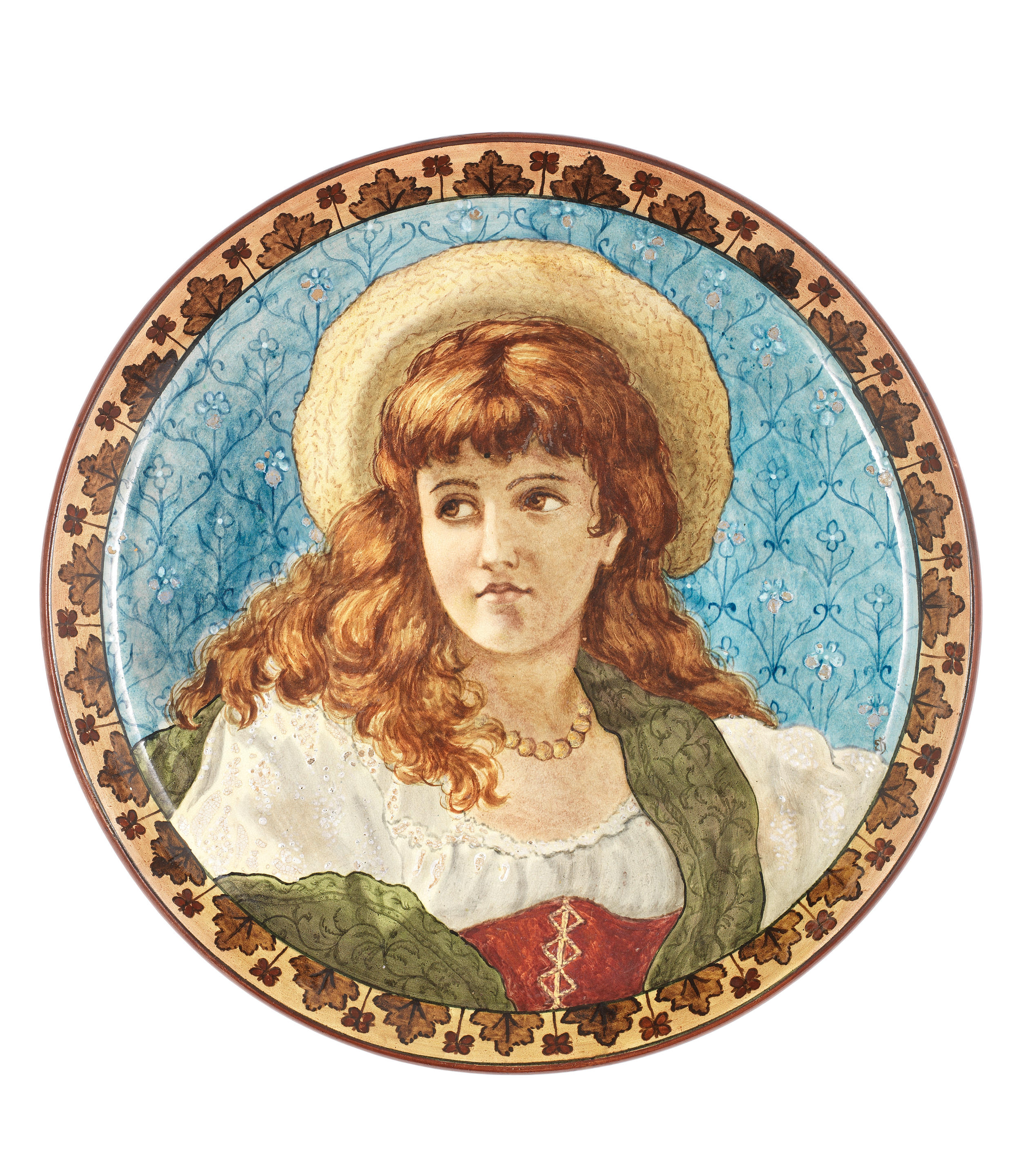
Faience plaque with Female Figure

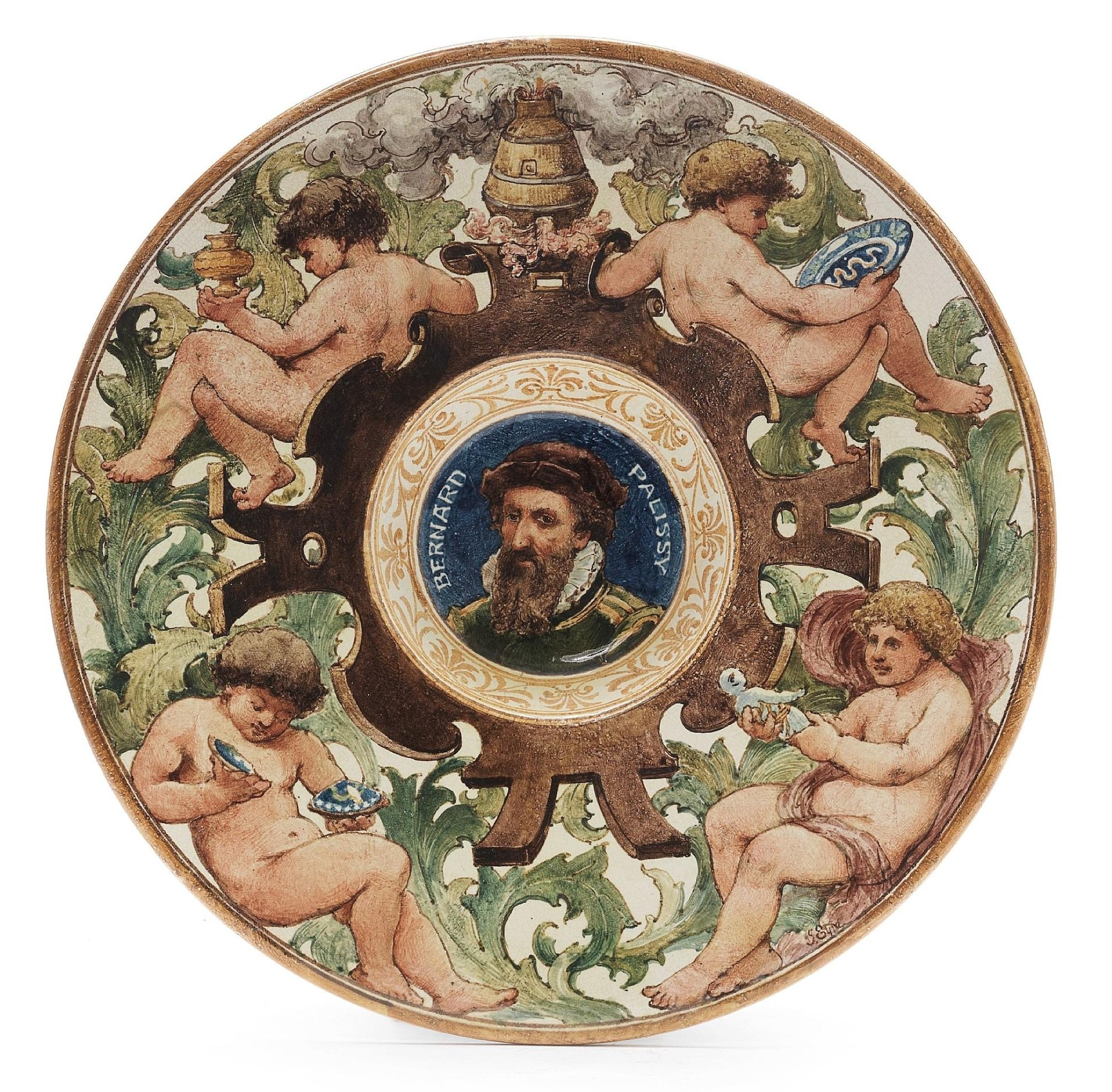
Faience commemorative plaque for Bernard Palissy

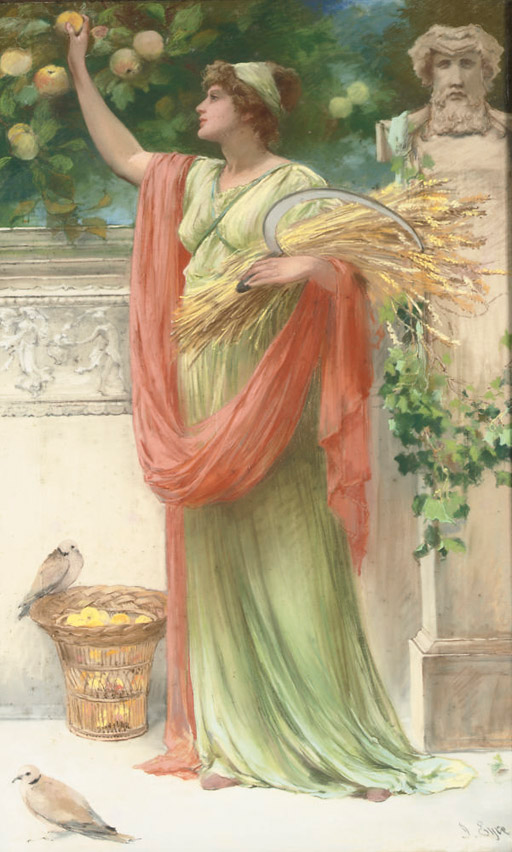
Autumn

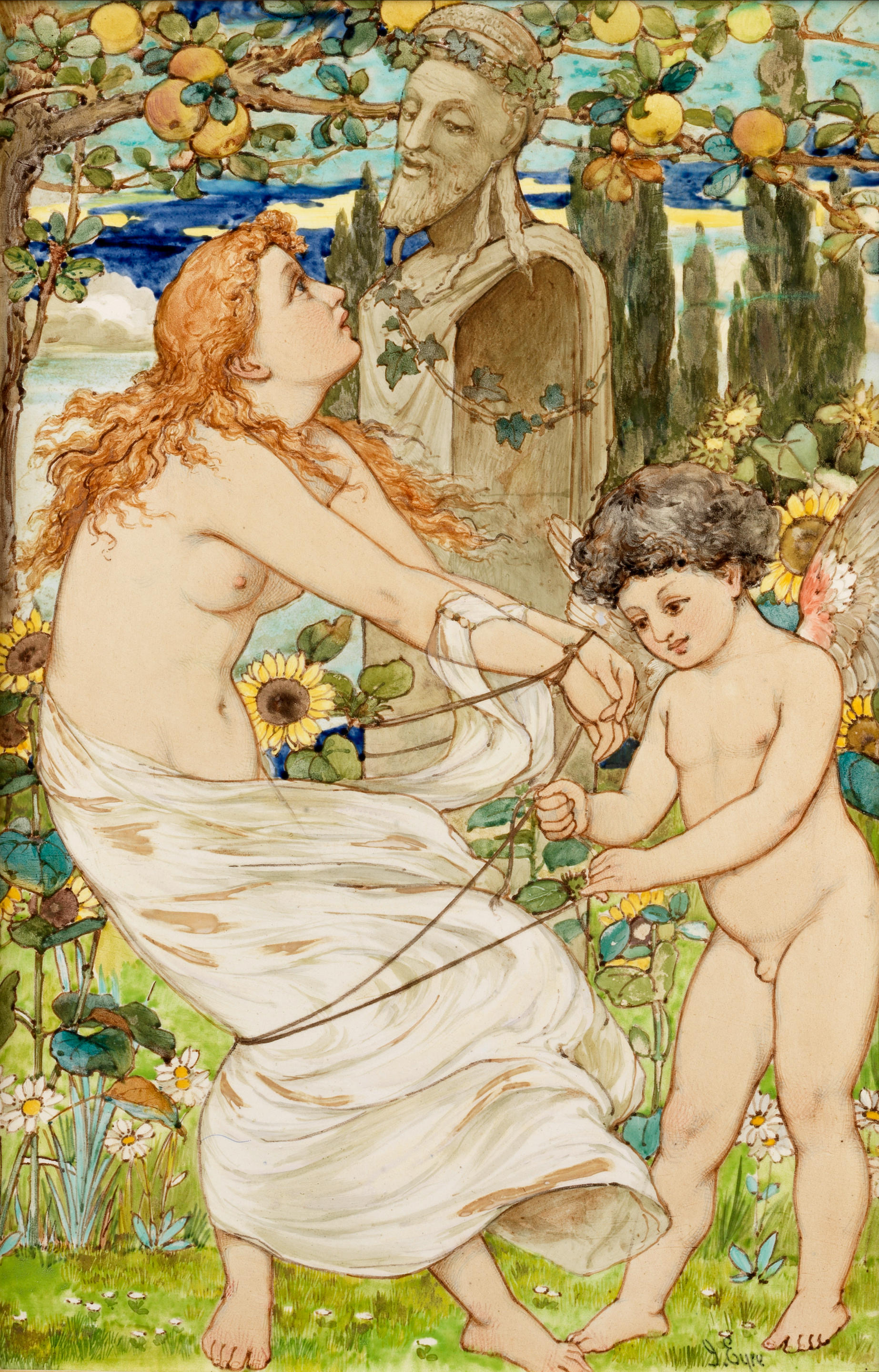
Ceramic design for Mintons or Doulton of Lambeth, c. 1880s-1890s.

== Illustrated ==
In addition to his ceramic artwork and paintings, John Eyre illustrated classic books, including the Pickwick Papers by Charles Dickens, In Memoriam A.H.H. by Alfred Tennyson Tennyson, The seaside and fireside and Voices of the night by Henry Wadsworth Longfellow, the Compleat Angler by Izaak Walton and Charles Cotton, Rip Van Winkle and Christmas Eve by Washington Irving.

He also illustrated Old Ballads, a book of folk music published about 1907, and Carol Adair by M. B Manwell.

== See also ==
- John Eyre (painter), Australian painter
