= Alan Eyre (diplomat) =

American diplomat

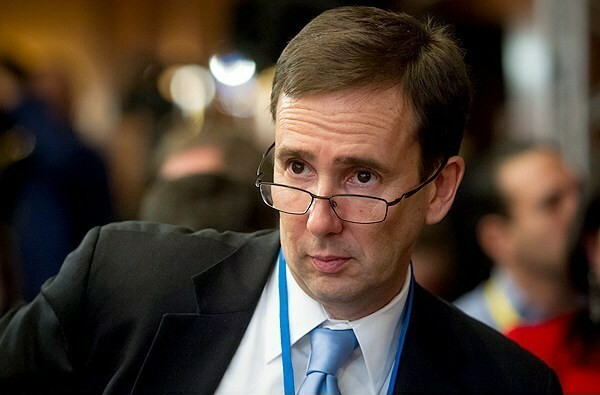
Alan Eyre (2013)

Alan E. Eyre is an American former diplomat who served as the first-ever Persian language spokesperson of the United States Department of State. Eyre became the State Department's Persian-language spokesperson in April 2011. The post was created as part of U.S. government efforts to communicate with the Iranian peoples.

== Early life and education ==
He studied American literature at Dartmouth College and became interested in Sufi poetry, so he taught himself Persian. He lived for a few years in Los Angeles and made friends in the city's large Iranian expatriate community. His favorite football team is "Tractor Tabriz" in Iran.

== Career ==
Eyre was the head of Iran office at the U.S. Consulate in Dubai, and is a fluent Persian speaker with Iranian proverbs and expressions. Eyre has been interviewed in Persian by some Persian-language media.

Eyre was involved in the nuclear talks with Iran and participated in written framework agreement negotiation.

He is currently a Distinguished Diplomatic Fellow at the Middle East Institute, and is a frequent guest contributor to PBS News Hour on the 2026 Iran war.
