= Jehu Eyre =

American businessman and revolutionary

- Born: January 10, 1738; Burlington, New Jersey, U.S.
- Died: July 23, 1781 (aged 43); Philadelphia, Pennsylvania, U.S.
- Burial place: Laurel Hill Cemetery, Philadelphia, Pennsylvania, U.S.
- Military career
- Rank: Colonel
- Commands: Kensington Artillery
- Conflicts: French and Indian War; Battle of Monogahela; American Revolutionary War; Battle of Brandywine

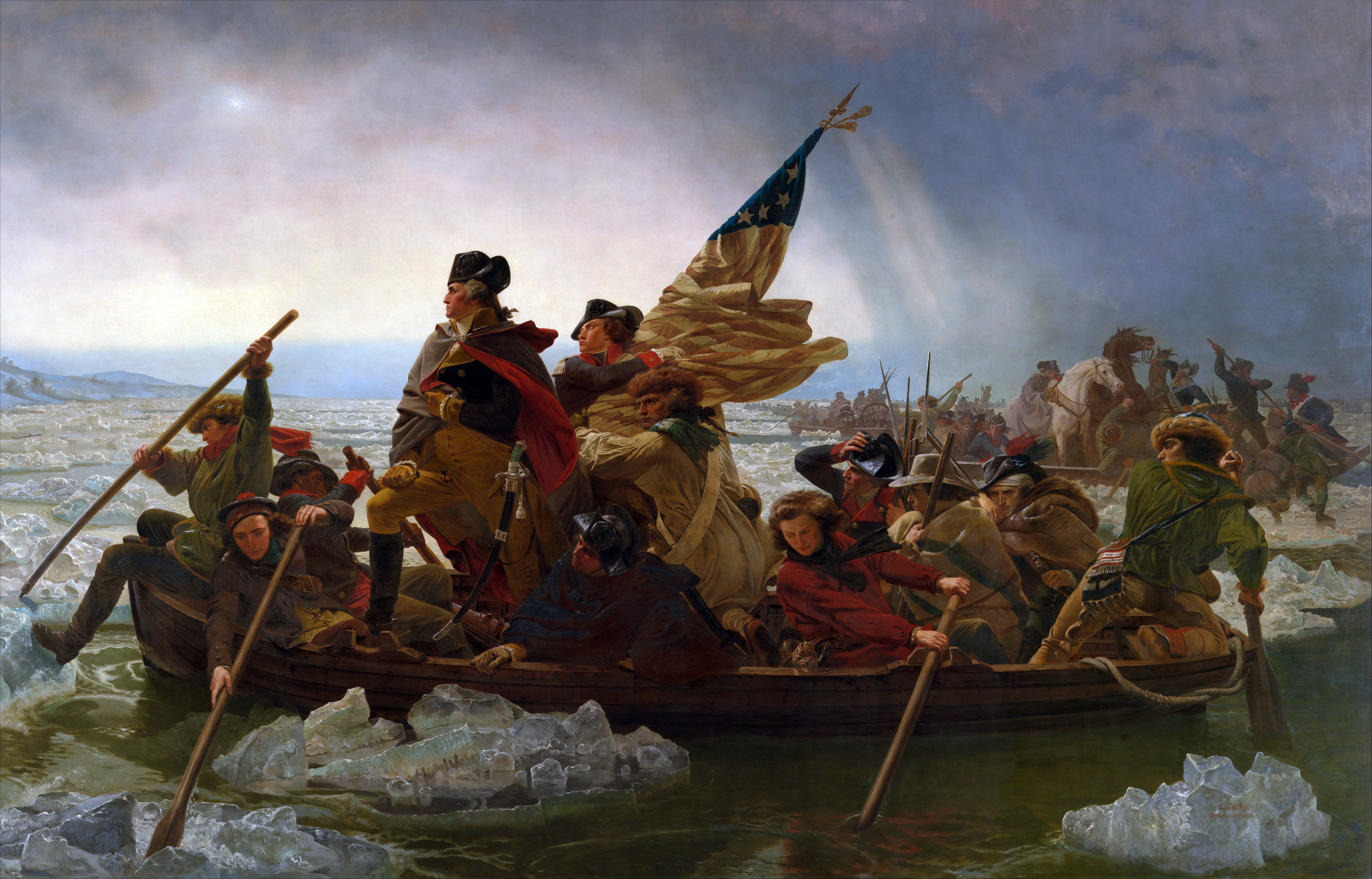
Jehu Eyre advised and fought alongside George Washington, with whom he crossed the Delaware in 1776.

Jehu Eyre or Ayer (January 10, 1738 – July 23, 1781) was an American businessman, veteran of the French and Indian War and American Revolutionary War, and member of the influential Eyre family, which played a major role in the American Revolution and the early Republic. Jehu's father George had emigrated to the Thirteen Colonies in 1727; the family was descended from one of the oldest noble lines in England.

== Biography ==
Eyre was born in Burlington, New Jersey. He married Lydia Wright Eyre on December 28, 1761, when Jehu was twenty-three years old. Jehu's brother Manuel, also an officer in the Continental Army, had married Lydia's sister Martha on January 8 of the same year. In total, Jehu and Lydia Eyre would have five children: George (named after his grandfather), Jehu Jr., Franklin, Sarah, and Lydia (named after her mother).

=== British soldier ===
Eyre fought alongside George Washington in the French and Indian War, serving as the Chief Engineer and Director of Artillery for the Province of Pennsylvania. Eyre and Washington were both participants in the July 9, 1755 Battle of Monongahela, when forces under British General Edward Braddock were defeated by combined French and Native American units.

Of the carnage there, Eyre later wrote:

When we came to the place where they crossed of the Monongahela, we saw a great many men's bones along the shore. We kept along the road about 1½ miles, where the first engagement begun, where there are men's bones lying about as thick as the leaves do on the ground; for they are so thick that one lies on top of another for about a half a mile in length and about one hundred yards in breadth.

=== Revolutionary ===
Eyre served under Washington at Valley Forge during the winter of 1776–1777. He and his brothers were commissioned by Washington to build vessels for the independence effort at the Eyre family's shipping yards in Kensington (now part of Philadelphia), and provided some of the first ships in the Continental Navy. In 1775 Eyre mustered his workers into a force for the defense of Philadelphia known as the "Kensington Artillery".

On December 25, 1776, Jehu Eyre "had charge of the boats" in Washington's crossing of the Delaware, a resounding success and a critical battle that saved the Revolution from being snuffed out in its infancy.

At the Battle of Brandywine, Colonel Eyre fought with his artillery company to halt the capture of Philadelphia, but his efforts were unsuccessful. Following the British occupation of the city in 1777, the naval works at Kensington were destroyed, to be rebuilt after the conflict's conclusion by Jehu's children and grandchildren. The Eyre Mansion, specifically targeted by the British, was ransacked that winter.

=== After independence ===
During the war, Eyre's shipping yards were destroyed and his house razed, amounting to a total loss of £6,392 as of 1778, for which neither he nor his family were ever compensated.

One of the frigates built by the Eyres, The Alliance, carried the Marquis de Lafayette to France in 1779 and then joined up with the fleet of John Paul Jones.

== Death and legacy ==
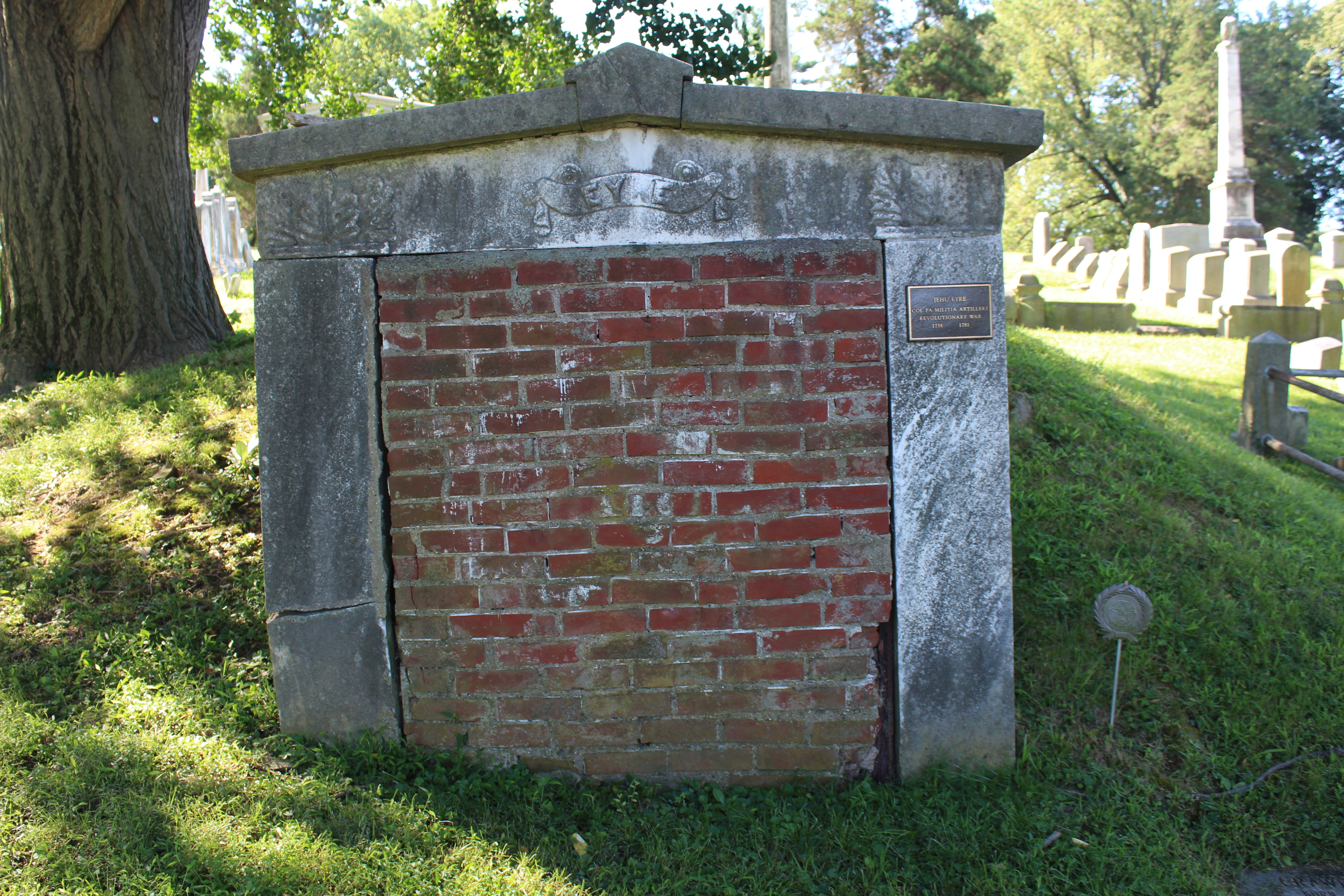
Jehu Eyre tomb in Laurel Hill Cemetery

Eyre died of malaria in Philadelphia, Pennsylvania, and his diaries were later published as The Memorials of Colonel Jehu Eyre. In 1853, his remains were taken from the Coates family graveyard and re-interred at Laurel Hill Cemetery in Philadelphia, where an Eyre family vault was constructed.

A portrait of Jehu Eyre can be found at Trumbull's Gallery at Yale College.

== See also ==
- Eyre legend

== Sources and external links ==
- List of Patriots — National Society Daughters of the American Revolution, Zachariah Davies Chapter
- Edgar S. MacLay, A History of American Privateers (includes illustration of Eyre)
