= Manuel Eyre =

Manuel Eyre (1736–1805) was a colonel in the Continental Army, a shipbuilder, and the brother of Revolutionary War heroes Benjamin and Jehu Eyre.

== Biography ==
Manuel Eyre was born in Burlington, New Jersey, one of five children of George Eyre and Mary Smith, his wife.

=== Career as shipbuilder ===
He had apprenticed as a shipwright to Richard Wright (shipbuilder). On January 8, 1761, he married Mary Wright, daughter of his professional master. His brother Jehu would marry Mary's sister Lydia on December 28 of the same year. Shortly after these marriages, the Eyres would take over the shipyards at Kensington (now part of Philadelphia).

=== Revolutionary ===
During the Revolution, the first ships built in the U.S. Navy were commissioned from the Eyres, the earliest being the gunboat Bull Dog, Philadelphia-built in August 1775.

=== After independence ===
After the war, he became a member of the Pennsylvania state legislature and continued to build on his business interests. The Eyre shipping yards that had been so vital to the cause of independence became the international business of Eyre and Massey, one of the largest shipping companies in the world.

One historian writes that, "Their vessels were known in almost every principal port of Europe and Asia, besides the United States and West Indian Islands ... [the company] held extensive mercantile intercourse with all parts of the world."

James Monroe, the fourth President of the United States, was an acquaintance of Manuel Eyre and spoke of him in his correspondence.

== Legacy ==
He died in 1805 and is interred at Palmer Cemetery in Philadelphia. Manuel's son, Manuel, Jr., would become Director of the Second Bank of the United States in 1816.
