= Providence =

Providence often refers to:

- Providentia, the divine personification of foresight in ancient Roman religion
- Divine providence, divinely ordained events and outcomes in some religions
- Providence, Rhode Island, the capital of Rhode Island in the United States

Providence may also refer to:

== Arts and entertainment ==
=== Fictional entities ===
- Providence, a government organization in the show Generator Rex
- HMS Providence, a fictional Royal Navy warship from the 2011 film Pirates of the Caribbean: On Stranger Tides
- Providence, a shadow organization and primary antagonist of the Hitman World of Assassination trilogy.
- Providence (Marvel Comics), a fictional island

=== Film and television ===
- Providence (1977 film), a French/Swiss film directed by Alain Resnais
- Providence (American TV series), a 1999–2002 NBC television series
- Providence (Canadian TV series), a 2005–2011 Radio-Canada television series
- "Providence" (The X-Files), a 2002 episode of the television series The X-Files
- "Providence" (Agents of S.H.I.E.L.D.), a 2014 episode of American TV series Agents of S.H.I.E.L.D.

=== Music ===
- Providence (band), a 1970s American rock band

==== Albums ====
- Providence, by Callisto, 2009
- Providence, by Poor Man's Poison, 2014
- Providence (album), a 2017 album by Nathan Fake

==== Songs ====
- "Providence", by Deerhunter from Cryptograms, 2007
- "Providence", by Foals from Holy Fire, 2013
- "Providence", by Godspeed You! Black Emperor from F♯ A♯ ∞, 1997
- "Providence", by King Crimson from Red, 1974
- "Providence", by Sonic Youth from Daydream Nation, 1988
- "Providence", by Tremonti from Cauterize, 2015
- "Providence", by Ulver from Wars of the Roses, 2011
- "Providence", by Withered Hand from Good News, 2009

=== Literature ===
- Providence (Kepnes novel), a 2018 novel by Caroline Kepnes
- Providence (Barry novel), a 2020 novel by Max Barry
- Providence (Avatar Press), a 2015 graphic novel by Alan Moore and Jacen Burrows

== Places ==
=== United States ===
- Providence, Alabama, a town in Marengo County
- Providence, Arkansas, in White County
- Providence, San Bernardino County, California
- Providence, Illinois, in Bureau County
- Providence, Indiana
- Providence, Kentucky, a city in Webster County
- Providence, Simpson County, Kentucky, an unincorporated community
- Providence, Trimble County, Kentucky, an unincorporated community
- Annapolis, Maryland, formerly Providence
- Providence, Cecil County, Maryland
- Providence, Minnesota, an unincorporated community
- Providence Township, Lac qui Parle County, Minnesota
- Providence, Boone County, Missouri
- Providence, Dunklin County, Missouri
- Providence, New York
- Providence, Caswell County, North Carolina
- Providence, Granville County, North Carolina
- Providence, McDowell County, North Carolina
- Providence, Rockingham County, North Carolina
- Providence, Ohio
- Providence, Rhode Island
- Providence, South Carolina, in Orangeburg County
- Providence, Texas
- Providence, Utah
- Providence, West Virginia

=== Elsewhere ===
- Providence, Colombia
- Providence, French Guiana
- Providence, Guyana
- Providence metro station, Marchienne-au-Pont, Belgium
- Providence Atoll in the Republic of Seychelles

== Schools ==
- Providence Christian Academy (Lilburn, Georgia)
- Providence Christian College
- Providence College, Providence, Rhode Island
- Providence Friars, athletic teams of Providence College
- Providence University College and Theological Seminary, in Manitoba, Canada
- Providence University, Shalu District, Taichung City, Taiwan
- University of Providence, Great Falls, Montana

== Ships ==
- Providence (ship), the name of several ships
- USS Providence, the name of several U.S. Navy ships
- HMS Providence, the name of several Royal Navy ships

== Other uses ==
- Eye of Providence, symbol depicting an eye in a triangle
- Providence (religious movement), Christian religious movement
- Providence (restaurant), Michelin-starred restaurant in Hollywood, California
- Providence Healthcare (disambiguation)
- Providence Spring, spring at Andersonville Prison, in the U.S. state of Georgia

== See also ==
- Provenance
- Province (disambiguation)
- Providence Township (disambiguation)
- New Providence (disambiguation)
- Fort Providence, Northwest Territories, Canada
- Old Providence
