= List of shipwrecks in 1776 =

The List of shipwrecks in 1776 includes some ships sunk, wrecked or otherwise lost during 1776.

table of contents
1776
Jan	Feb	Mar	Apr
May	Jun	Jul	Aug
Sep	Oct	Nov	Dec
Unknown date

== January ==
=== 4 January ===
List of shipwrecks: 4 January 1776
Ship	State	Description
Eendragt	Prussia	The ship was driven ashore in Tor Bay.

=== 5 January ===
List of shipwrecks: 5 January 1776
Ship	State	Description
Barbara	Great Britain	The ship was driven ashore and wrecked at Great Yarmouth, Norfolk. She was on a voyage from Campveer, Dutch Republic to Leith, Lothian.

=== 6 January ===
List of shipwrecks: 6 January 1776
Ship	State	Description
Prudence	Ireland	The ship was driven ashore and wrecked on the Holderness coast, Yorkshire, Great Britain. She was on a voyage from Saint Petersburg, Russia to Dublin.

=== 7 January ===
List of shipwrecks: 7 January 1776
Ship	State	Description
Bieune Stock Ohlsen	Hamburg	The ship foundered in The Swin. She was on a voyage from Hamburg to Cádiz, Spain and Livorno, Grand Duchy of Tuscany.
Macklane	Great Britain	The ship was driven ashore and wrecked at Pakefield, Suffolk. Her crew were rescued. She was on a voyage from London to Newcastle upon Tyne, Northumberland and Grenada.

=== 8 January ===
List of shipwrecks: 8 January 1776
Ship	State	Description
Barnard's Goodwill	Great Britain	The ship was driven ashore at Great Yarmouth, Norfolk.
Endeavour	Great Britain	The ship was driven ashore and wrecked at Great Yarmouth. She was on a voyage from Dover, Kent to Newcastle upon Tyne, Northumberland.
Johanna Juliana	Stettin	The ship was driven ashore on Terschelling, Dutch Republic. She was on a voyage from Stettin to London, Great Britain.
Hopewell	Great Britain	The ship was driven ashore at Great Yarmouth.

=== 14 January ===
List of shipwrecks: 14 January 1776
Ship	State	Description
Three Brothers	Great Britain	The ship foundered in the Mediterranean Sea off Menorca. She was on a voyage from Sicily to Lisbon, Portugal.

=== 16 January ===
List of shipwrecks: 16 January 1776
Ship	State	Description
Thames	Great Britain	The ship capsized at Plymouth, Devon and was severely damaged.

=== 23 January ===
List of shipwrecks: 23 January 1776
Ship	State	Description
Benn	Great Britain	The ship ran aground and was wrecked at Ramsgate, Kent.

=== 27 January ===
List of shipwrecks: 27 January 1776
Ship	State	Description
Johan Ernst	Danzig	The ship was driven ashore at Peterhead, Aberdeenshire, Great Britain. She was on a voyage from Danzig to Cork, Ireland.

=== 29 January ===
List of shipwrecks: 29 January 1776
Ship	State	Description
Bacchus	Great Britain	The ship was driven ashore and wrecked in Tor Bay. She was on a voyage from Porto, Portugal to Guernsey, Channel Islands.
Europa	Great Britain	The ship was driven ashore and wrecked in Tor Bay. She was on a voyage from Porto to Guernsey.

=== Unknown date ===
List of shipwrecks: Unknown date 1776
Ship	State	Description
Allice	Great Britain	The ship foundered in the Atlantic Ocean. She was on a voyage from Liverpool, Lancashire to British America and back.
Anna Maria	Great Britain	The ship caught fire at the Tower of London and sank in the River Thames. She was on a voyage from London to Cork, Ireland.
Ann & Dorothy	Sweden	The ship was driven ashore and wrecked on the French coast with the loss of all hands.
Bridlington	Great Britain	The ship was driven ashore in the Humber.
Charles	Great Britain	The ship departed from Liverpool for Africa. No further trace, presumed foundered with the loss of all hands.
Duke of Richmond	Great Britain	The ship was wrecked on the coast of Norway with the loss of two of her crew.
Flora	France	The ship was driven ashore at Dunkirk. She was on a voyage from Dunkirk to the West Indies.
Friendship	Great Britain	The ship was lost in Teignmouth Bay. She was on a voyage from London to Bristol.
Hedwick	Great Britain	The ship was driven ashore near Calais, France. She was on a voyage from Gothenburg, Sweden to Leith, Lothian.
King George	Great Britain	The ship was driven ashore near Messina, Sicily.
Mary	Great Britain	The ship was driven ashore and wrecked. She was on a voyage from Portsey, Hampshire to London.
Meredith	Great Britain	The ship departed from Saint Augustine for London. No further trace, presumed foundered with the loss of all hands.
Minerva	Great Britain	The ship was driven ashore near Bridlington, Yorkshire with the loss of six of her crew.
Polly	Great Britain	The ship was driven ashore at Gravelines, France. Her crew were rescued. She was on a voyage from a Scottish port to Dunkirk, France.
Rosemay	Great Britain	The ship was lost at Cádiz, Spain with the loss of five of her crew. She was on a voyage from Danzig to Portsmouth, Hampshire and Barcelona, Spain.
Sirène	French Navy	The corvette was wrecked in the Ganges.
Thames	Great Britain	The ship capsized at Plymouth, Devon.
Three Brothers	Great Britain	The ship was driven ashore whilst on a voyage from Wisbech, Cambridgeshire to London.
Two Brothers	Ireland	The ship was driven ashore near King's Lynn, Norfolk, Great Britain. She was on a voyage from Copenhagen, Denmark to Cork.
William	Ireland	The ship was driven onto rocks off the Isle of Man and was severely damaged. She was on a voyage from Alicante, Spain to Dublin.
William	Great Britain	The ship was lost at Ferryland, Newfoundland, British America. She was on a voyage from Newfoundland to Dominica.

== February ==
=== 7 February ===
List of shipwrecks: 7 February 1776
Ship	State	Description
St. Ives	France	The ship was driven ashore and wrecked 8 nautical miles (15 km) from Minehead, Somerset, Great Britain with the loss of a crew member. She was on a voyage from Bordeaux to Saint-Malo.
Triumph	Great Britain	The ship was driven ashore and wrecked in the Isles of Scilly. She was on a voyage from Liverpool, Lancashire to London.

=== 20 February ===
List of shipwrecks: 20 February 1776
Ship	State	Description
Boston	Great Britain	The ship foundered in the Atlantic Ocean with the loss of three of her crew. She was on a voyage from Grenada to Jamaica and London.

=== 21 February ===
List of shipwrecks: 21 February 1776
Ship	State	Description
Polly	Great Britain	The ship was wrecked on the Goodwin Sands, Kent. She was on a voyage from London to Senegal.

=== Unknown date ===
List of shipwrecks: Unknown date 1776
Ship	State	Description
Assumption	Spain	The ship departed from Bilbao for Bristol, Gloucestershire, Great Britain. No further trace, presumed foundered with the loss of all hands.
Brothers	Great Britain	The ship was driven ashore at Cap La Hougue, France. She was on a voyage from London to Senegal. She was later refloated.
Brothers	Great Britain	The ship was driven ashore in Carmarthen Bay. She was on a voyage from Bordeaux, France to Dort, Dutch Republic.
Charlotte	Great Britain	The ship was wrecked at Kinsale, County Cork, Ireland. Her crew were rescued. She was on a voyage from Jamaica to Bristol.
De Anthony & Jan Arnaud	Dutch Republic	The ship was driven ashore near Padstow, Cornwall, Great Britain. She was on a voyage from St. Andero, Spain to Amsterdam.
Harbrough	Great Britain	The ship was destroyed by fire at Hull, Yorkshire.
Hawke	Great Britain	The yacht was lost in Dungarvan Bay. She was on a voyage from Bristol to Barcelona, Spain.
Hetty	(United States) British America	The ship was driven ashore and wrecked near Padstow. Her crew were rescued. She was on a voyage from Faro, Portugal to London.
Jenny	Great Britain	The ship was lost whilst on a voyage from Danzig to Liverpool, Lancashire.
Lyon	Great Britain	The transport ship was lost in the Isles of Scilly. All on board were rescued.
Mary	Great Britain	The ship was driven ashore in tie Isles of Scilly. She was on a voyage from Bristol to Pool, Dorset.
Molly	Ireland	The ship was wrecked at Hubberstone, Pembrokeshire, Great Britain. She was on a voyage from Dublin to Havre de Grâce, France.
Morson	Great Britain	The ship was driven ashore near Liverpool. She was on a voyage from Saint Kitts to Lancaster, Lancashire.
Rialto	Great Britain	The ship was lost at Kinsale. She was on a voyage from Jamaica to Bristol.
Ruby	Great Britain	The ship was lost in Ballycotton Bay. She was on a voyage from Bristol to London.
St. Nicholas	France	The ship was driven ashore near Fowey, Cornwall. She was on a voyage from La Rochelle to Rouen.
Thomas	Great Britain	The ship was lost in the Isles of Scilly. She was on a voyage from Bordeaux to Hamburg.
William & Mary	Great Britain	The ship was wrecked on the French coast with the loss of all but one of her crew.
Young Gotfried	Bremen	The ship was driven ashore on Heligoland. She was on a voyage from Limerick, Ireland to Bremen.

== March ==
=== 12 March ===
List of shipwrecks: 12 March 1776
Ship	State	Description
Neptune	Ireland	The brig foundered in the Atlantic Ocean having sprang a leak the day before. Her crew were rescued by Peggy (Great Britain). Neptune was on a voyage from Dingle, County Kerry to Lisbon, Portugal.
Roman Eagle	Great Britain	The ship was driven ashore and wrecked on the east coast of Menorca with the loss of at least eleven lives.

=== 21 March ===
List of shipwrecks: 21 March 1776
Ship	State	Description
William & Ann	Great Britain	The ship was run down and sunk in the North Sea. Her crew were rescued by Patty (Great Britain). William and Ann was on a voyage from Sunderland, County Durham to King's Lynn, Norfolk.

=== 22 March ===
List of shipwrecks: 22 March 1776
Ship	State	Description
Hibernia	Ireland	The ship was destroyed by fire in the River Thames.

=== 24 March ===
List of shipwrecks: 24 March 1776
Ship	State	Description
Dominicus Teum	Danzig	The ship was driven ashore at Danzig.

=== 27 March ===
List of shipwrecks: 27 March 1776
Ship	State	Description
Blue Mountain Valley	United States	American Revolution: The captured British supply ship was burned in a British Raid on Elizabethtown Point.

=== Unknown date ===
List of shipwrecks: Unknown date 1776
Ship	State	Description
Catherina	Ireland	The ship was lost at Lisbon, Portugal. She was on a voyage from Kinsale, County Cork to Lisbon.
Industrious Bee	Great Britain	The ship was lost at Figueira da Foz, Portugal. She was on a voyage from Newfoundland, British America to Figueria da Foz.
Polly	Great Britain	The ship was lost near Barrowhead, Scotland. She was on a voyage from Barbados to Ireland and Liverpool, Lancashire.
Prince William	Great Britain	The ship was lost off Milford, Pembrokeshire. Her crew were rescued. She was on a voyage from Bristol, Gloucestershire to Dublin, Ireland.
Shaw	Ireland	The ship was lost on the Arklow Banks, in the Irish Sea off the coast of County Wicklow. She was on a voyage from Rotterdam, Dutch Republic to Newry, County Antrim.
Swift	Great Britain	The ship was destroyed by fire in the English Channel off Portland, Dorset with the loss of nine lives. She was on a voyage from London to Quebec.

== April ==
=== 4 April ===
List of shipwrecks: 4 April 1776
Ship	State	Description
Baltimore	Great Britain	The ship departed from London for Africa. No further trace, presumed foundered with the loss of all hands.

=== 9 April ===
List of shipwrecks: 9 April 1776
Ship	State	Description
Union	Great Britain	The ship was wrecked on "Burkholm". She was on a voyage from Hamburg to Wismar.

=== 19 April ===
List of shipwrecks: 19 April 1776
Ship	State	Description
Ann and Elizabeth	Great Britain	The whaler was lost on "Sindey Island" with the loss of five of her crew.

=== 26 April ===
List of shipwrecks: 26 April 1776
Ship	State	Description
Vrouwe Maria	Dutch Republic	The ship was wrecked on the Goodwin Sands, Kent, Great Britain. Her crew were rescued. She was on a voyage from Amsterdam to Bilbao, Spain.

=== Unknown date ===
List of shipwrecks: Unknown date 1776
Ship	State	Description
Brotherly Love	Great Britain	The ship was driven ashore at Memel, Prussia.
Coalition	Great Britain	The ship was driven ashore in the River Mersey. She was on a voyage from Liverpool, Lancashire to London.
Endeavour	Great Britain	The ship was driven ashore at Margate, Kent.
Houghton	Great Britain	The ship foundered in the Baltic Sea off Riga, Russia.
John	Great Britain	The ship was lost in the Baltic Sea. She was on a voyage from Whitby, Yorkshire to Memel.
Mermaid	Great Britain	The ship was wrecked on Muhu, Russia. She was on a voyage from Newcastle upon Tyne, Northumberland to Wismar.
Pike	Great Britain	The ship sank in the River Suir at Waterford, Ireland. She was on a voyage from Pool, Dorset to Waterford and Newfoundland, British America.

== May ==
=== 3 May ===
List of shipwrecks: 3 May 1776
Ship	State	Description
John & Isabella	Great Britain	The ship sprang a leak and foundered in the English Channel off The Lizard, Cornwall. She was on a voyage from London to Dublin, Kingdom of Ireland.

=== 18 May ===
List of shipwrecks: 18 May 1776
Ship	State	Description
HMS Aldborough	(Kingdom of Great Britain) Royal Navy	The sixth rate was driven ashore and wrecked at Plymouth, Devon.
Nossa Senhora da Conceição	Portugal	The ship departed from Goa, India on this date. No further trace, presumed foundered with the loss of all hands.

=== 19 May ===
List of shipwrecks: 19 May 1776
Ship	State	Description
USS Franklin	United States Navy	American Revolution: The schooner was run aground during a battle with Royal Navy ships near Nantasket, Massachusetts.
St James	Great Britain	American Revolutionary War: The ship was captured by the privateer Cornet (United States) on this date. The pair were chased in to Charles Town, South Carolina by HMS Sphinx ( (Kingdom of Great Britain) Royal Navy). St James had too deep a draught to enter port and was beached. She was burnt by HMS Sphinx.

=== Unknown date ===
List of shipwrecks: Unknown date 1776
Ship	State	Description
Britannia	Great Britain	The ship was driven ashore and wrecked on the Isle of Wight.
Duke of Cumberland	Great Britain	The packet boat foundered in the Atlantic Ocean off the Isles of Scilly with the loss of all but one of her crew. She was on a voyage from Virginia, British America to Falmouth, Cornwall.
Hector	Great Britain	The ship ran aground on the West Hoyle Bank, in Liverpool Bay and was severely damaged. She was on a voyage from Liverpool, Lancashire to Africa.
Hester	Ireland	The ship was lost at Killala, County Cork. She was on a voyage from Saint Kitts to Killala.
Present Success	Great Britain	The ship was wrecked on Saltholm, Denmark. She was on a voyage from Memel, Prussia to North Shields, County Durham.
Syren	Great Britain	The whaler was lost in the Shetland Islands with the loss of all hands.

== June ==
=== 27 June ===
List of shipwrecks: 27 June 1776
Ship	State	Description
Betsey	Great Britain	The sloop was lost on the Sunk Sand, in the North Sea off the coast of Essex. Her crew were rescued. She was on a voyage from Sunderland, County Durham to Weymouth, Dorset.

=== 29 June ===
List of shipwrecks: 29 June 1776
Ship	State	Description
HMS Actaeon	(Kingdom of Great Britain) Royal Navy	American Revolutionary War: The sixth rate frigate was lost in action off Fort Sullivan, South Carolina, United States on this date.
Nancy	United States	American Revolutionary War, Battle of Turtle Gut Inlet: The brig ran aground near Cape May and was consequently destroyed by gunpowder to prevent capture by the British.

=== Unknown date ===
List of shipwrecks: Unknown date 1776
Ship	State	Description
Flying Mercury	Danzig	The ship was driven ashore and wrecked at Great Yarmouth, Norfolk, Great Britain. She was on a voyage from Danzig to Sheerness and Chatham, Kent, Great Britain.
Henry	Great Britain	The ship was lost off King's Lynn, Norfolk.
St Anthony	Ireland	The ship was driven ashore and wrecked near Sligo. She was on a voyage from Ballyshannon, County Donegal to Norway.

== July ==
=== 4 July ===
List of shipwrecks: 4 July 1776
Ship	State	Description
Unknown	Great Britain	American Revolutionary War:The armed sloop is fired on and sunk at Elizabethtown Point.

=== 6 July ===
List of shipwrecks: 6 July 1776
Ship	State	Description
Seaflower	Great Britain	The sloop foundered in the Bristol Channel off Pwlldu Bay, Glamorgan with some loss of life.

=== 9 July ===
List of shipwrecks: 9 July 1776
Ship	State	Description
Lady Stanley	Great Britain	American Revolution: The sloop, a possible privateer, was burned at Gwynn's Island, or was captured.
Lively	Great Britain	American Revolution: The schooner, a possible privateer, was scuttled by burning in a creek on Gwynn's Island to prevent capture.

=== Unknown date ===
List of shipwrecks: Unknown date 1776
Ship	State	Description
Diogess	Great Britain	The ship was holed by her anchor and sank in the River Thames. She was on a voyage from Antigua to London.
Drontheim	(Denmark) Norway	The ship was wrecked on the Goodwin Sands, Kent, Kingdom of Great Britain. Her crew were rescued. She was on a voyage from Bordeaux, France to Trondheim.
Friends Adventure	Great Britain	The ship was lost at Charles Town, South Carolina, United States.
Prince of Piedmont	Great Britain	The ship was lost at Charles Town.
Unknown	United States	American Revolution: The sloop was burned at Smith's Island in the Potomac River in mid July.
Unknown	United States	American Revolution: The craft was burned at Smith's Island in the Potomac River in mid July.
Violet	Great Britain	African slave trade: The ship departed from Africa with 420 slaves on board. No further trace, presumed foundered with the loss of all on board.

== August ==
=== Unknown date ===
List of shipwrecks: Unknown date 1776
Ship	State	Description
Ann	Great Britain	The ship was wrecked on the Goodwin Sands, Kent. She was on a voyage from London to Cork, Ireland.
Deptford	Great Britain	The ship wax lost in the Baltic Sea. She was on a voyage from Newcastle upon Tyne, Northumberland to Copenhagen, Denmark and Memel, Prussia.
Jane	Great Britain	The ship foundered in the Kattegat. She was on a voyage from Saint Petersburg, Russia to Dublin, Ireland.
King's Fisher	Great Britain	The ship foundered in the Gulf of Lyons. Her crew were rescued. She was on a voyage from Genoa to Valencia, Spain.
Lisbon Paquet	Great Britain	The ship was lost on a sandbank in the Baltic Sea.
Seanymph	Great Britain	The ship was lost in the Baltic Sea. She was on a voyage from Saint Petersburg, Russia to Hull, Yorkshire.

== September ==
=== 3 September ===
List of shipwrecks: 3 September 1776
Ship	State	Description
Betsey	Great Britain	The ship was wrecked on the coast of Spain.

=== 6 September ===
List of shipwrecks: 6 September 1776
Ship	State	Description
Betsey	Great Britain	The ship foundered at Basseterre, Saint Kitts.
Fox	Great Britain	The ship was driven ashore at Bluff Point, Saint Kitts.
Johanna	Great Britain	The ship foundered at Basseterre.
Peggy	Great Britain	The ship foundered at Basseterre.
Regicobus	Great Britain	The ship was driven ashore at Basseterre.

=== 16 September ===
List of shipwrecks: 16 September 1776
Ship	State	Description
HMS Savage	(Kingdom of Great Britain) Royal Navy	The brig-sloop was wrecked on Scatarie Island, Nova Scotia, British America with the loss of two of her crew.

=== 19 September ===
List of shipwrecks: 19 September 1776
Ship	State	Description
Aurora	United States	The brigantine was wrecked at Portsmouth, New Hampshire. All on board survived.

=== 22 September ===
List of shipwrecks: 22 September 1776
Ship	State	Description
Endeavour	Great Britain	The ship was wrecked on the coast of Labrador, British America.

=== Unknown date ===
List of shipwrecks: Unknown date 1776
Ship	State	Description
Alexander	Great Britain	The ship was driven ashore at Londonderry, Kingdom of Ireland.
Charles	France	The ship was lost near Selsea, Sussex, Great Britain. She was on a voyage from La Rochelle to Dunkirk.
Concordia	Great Britain	The ship was driven ashore in the Orkney Islands. She was on a voyage from Liverpool, Lancashire to "Sunderburgh".
Frederica Maria	Russia	The hoy was wrecked on Anholt, Denmark. She was on a voyage from Bordeaux, France to Saint Petersburg.
Maryann	Great Britain	The ship was lost on the Bowbell Sand. She was on a voyage from London to Barbados.

== October ==
=== 8 October ===
List of shipwrecks: 8 October 1776
Ship	State	Description
Hero	Great Britain	The ship was driven ashore and severely damaged at Liverpool, Lancashire. She was on a voyage from Liverpool to Africa.

=== 9 October ===
List of shipwrecks: 9 October 1776
Ship	State	Description
Turtle	United States	American Revolutionary War: The submersible was lost when the sloop she was aboard was sunk by gunfire by the frigates HMS Phoenix, HMS Roebuck, and HMS Tartar (all (Kingdom of Great Britain) Royal Navy) in the Hudson River near Fort Washington on Manhattan.
Unidentified sloop	United States	American Revolutionary War: The small sloop was sunk by gunfire by the frigates HMS Phoenix, HMS Roebuck, and HMS Tartar (all (Kingdom of Great Britain) Royal Navy) in the Hudson River near Fort Washington on Manhattan.

=== 11 October ===
List of shipwrecks: 11 October 1776
Ship	State	Description
USS Philadelphia	(United States) Continental Navy	American Revolutionary War, Battle of Valcour Island: The 54-foot (16 m) gundalow was sunk in the Valcour Strait in Lake Champlain by a Royal Navy ship. The wreck was raised in 1935 and preserved at the National Museum of American History in Washington, D.C.

=== 12 October ===
List of shipwrecks: 12 October 1776
Ship	State	Description
Belieze	Great Britain	The cutter was lost on the coast of Florida, British America. She was on a voyage from British Honduras to London.
USS Providence	(United States) Continental Navy	American Revolutionary War, Battle of Valcour Island: The gundalow was scuttled in Lake Champlain at Schuyler Island following damage sustained in battle.
USS Spitfire	(United States) Continental Navy	American Revolutionary War, Battle of Valcour Island: Abandoned by her crew, the 54-foot (16 m) gundalow sank in Lake Champlain off Schuyler Island due to damage sustained in battle.

=== 13 October ===
List of shipwrecks: 13 October 1776
Ship	State	Description
USS Boston	(United States) Continental Navy	American Revolutionary War, Battle of Valcour Island: The gundalow was set afire and scuttled in Buttonmold Bay on Lake Champlain to prevent capture by the British.
USS Congress	(United States) Continental Navy	American Revolutionary War, Battle of Valcour Island: The row galley was beached and set afire on Lake Champlain at Crown Point, New York, following damage sustained in battle.
USS New Haven	(United States) Continental Navy	American Revolutionary War, Battle of Valcour Island: The gundalow was beached, set afire and destroyed in Ferris's Bay on Lake Champlain.

=== 22 October ===
List of shipwrecks: 22 October 1776
Ship	State	Description
No. 53	Imperial Russian Navy	The polacca ran aground and foundered in the Strait of Kerch. She was on a voyage from Yenikale to the ru:Petrovskaya Fortress on the Sea of Azov. She broke up in a storm on 27 October.

=== 29 October ===
List of shipwrecks: 29 October 1776
Ship	State	Description
Allerton	Great Britain	The ship was driven ashore and wrecked near Memel, Prussia. She was on a voyage from Liverpool, Lancashire to Memel.
Concord	Great Britain	The ship was driven ashore and wrecked near Memel.

=== Unknown date ===
List of shipwrecks: Unknown date 1776
Ship	State	Description
Friends Good Hope	Great Britain	The ship was driven ashore and wrecked on Læsø, Denmark. Her crew were rescued. She was on a voyage from Great Yarmouth, Norfolk to Königsburg, Prussia.
Lenox	Great Britain	The ship was driven ashore and wrecked on the coast of Jutland. She was on a voyage from Memel, Prussia to Lisbon, Portugal
Mary & Harriot	Great Britain	The ship was lost near Danzig. Her crew were rescued.
Polly	Great Britain	The ship departed from Liverpool, Lancashire for Dublin, Ireland. No further trace, presumed foundered with the loss of all hands.
Triton	France	The ship was lost at Peniche, Portugal. She was on a voyage from Gothenburg, Sweden to Marseille
Turtle	(United States) Continental Navy	American Revolutionary War: The submersible was sunk along with her tender vessel near Fort Lee, New Jersey after 5 October.

== November ==
=== 1 November ===
List of shipwrecks: 11November 1776
Ship	State	Description
Aurora	Great Britain	American Revolution: The supply brig ran aground, or foundered in shallow water, near Ocracoke Inlet, North Carolina. Ship and crew captured.

=== 11 November ===
List of shipwrecks: 11 November 1776
Ship	State	Description
Eleanor	Ireland	The ship was lost on the Niden. She was on a voyage from Riga, Russia to Londonderry.

=== 12 November ===
List of shipwrecks: 12 November 1776
Ship	State	Description
L'Esprit	France	The ship was wrecked on the Sandhammer. She was on a voyage from Saint Petersburg, Russia to Brest.

=== 16 November ===
List of shipwrecks: 16 November 1776
Ship	State	Description
Beckey or "Lady Washington"	United States	The brigantine stranded on Cape Henry.

=== 17 November ===
List of shipwrecks: 17 November 1776
Ship	State	Description
Friends Goodwill	Great Britain	The ship was driven ashore 7 nautical miles (13 km) north west of Caernarfon. She was on a voyage from Cork, Ireland to Maryport, Cumberland.

=== 20 November ===
List of shipwrecks: 20 November 1776
Ship	State	Description
Joanna	Great Britain	The ship foundered in the Bristol Channel off Portishead, Somerset. She was on a voyage from Jamaica to Bristol, Gloucestershire.

=== 21 November ===
List of shipwrecks: 21 November 1776
Ship	State	Description
St Anthony	Spain	The ship was driven ashore 2 leagues (6 nautical miles (11 km)) from Étaples, France. She was on a voyage from Bilbao to London, Great Britain.
Yongst Pieter	Dutch Republic	The ship was driven ashore and wrecked on Texel. She was on a voyage from Amsterdam to Lisbon, Portugal.
Zee Nimpf	Great Britain	The ship was driven ashore on Texel. She was on a voyage from Amsterdam to Lisbon.

=== 22 November ===
List of shipwrecks: 22 November 1776
Ship	State	Description
Unknown	Great Britain	American Revolutionary War:The transport, that had run aground in the Strait of Canso on an unknown date, was burned by privateer "Alfred" (United States).

=== 24 November ===
List of shipwrecks: 24 November 1776
Ship	State	Description
Hope	Great Britain	The ship was sighted off Dunkirk, France. No further trace, presumed foundered with the loss of all hands. She was on a voyage from Middelburg, Dutch Republic to Pool, Dorset and London.

=== 30 November ===
List of shipwrecks: 30 November 1776
Ship	State	Description
Robert & Susanna	Great Britain	The ship foundered off Pool, Dorset with the loss of two of her seven crew. She was on a voyage from Lymington, Hampshire to Pool.

=== Unknown date ===
List of shipwrecks: Unknown date 1776
Ship	State	Description
Blessing	Great Britain	The ship was driven ashore at Hoylake, Cheshire. She was on a voyage from Livorno, Grand Duchy of Tuscany to Chester, Cheshire.
Catharina	flag unknown	The ship foundered off the coast o Norway. She was on a voyage from Liverpool, Lancashire, Great Britain to "Sunderburgh".
Charles Sharp	Great Britain	The ship capsized at Gosport, Hampshire.
Dove	Great Britain	The ship foundered in the Kentish Well. She was on a voyage from Newcastle upon Tyne, Northumberland to Rouen, France.
Gustaff	Great Britain	The ship was lost in the Baltic Sea. She was on a voyage from Sweden to Liverpool.
Hope	Great Britain	The ship was driven ashore between Padstow and St. Ives, Cornwall. She was on a voyage from Dublin, Ireland to Cowes, Isle of Wight.
Hope	Great Britain	The ship foundered in the English Channel off Dungeness, Kent. She was on a voyage from Newcastle upon Tyne to Pool, Dorset.
Loyal Jane	Great Britain	The ship was driven ashore at Gravelines, France. She was on a voyage from London to Dunkirk, France.
Mary	Great Britain	The ship was driven ashore at Whitstable, Kent. She was on a voyage from British Honduras to London.
New Content	Great Britain	The ship was driven ashore on the Dutch coast. She was on a voyage from L'Orient, France to Amsterdam, Dutch Republic.
Patsey	Great Britain	The ship was driven ashore at Liverpool.
Triton	Great Britain	The ship was driven ashore at Hoylake. She was on a voyage from Zakynthos to Liverpool.

== December ==
=== 23 December ===
List of shipwrecks: 23 December 1776
Ship	State	Description
True Endeavour	Ireland	The ship was lost on the French coast. She was on a voyage from Cork to Havre de Grâce, France.

=== 30 December ===
List of shipwrecks: 30 December 1776
Ship	State	Description
Neptune	Ireland	The ship struck a rock off Cobh, County Cork and was severely damaged. She put into Crookhaven. Neptune was on a voyage from Dublin to Antigua.

=== 31 December ===
List of shipwrecks: 31 December 1776
Ship	State	Description
Argus	Sweden	The ship was lost near Calais, France with the loss of all hands.
Boomoort	Dutch Republic	The ship was lost near Calais with the loss of all hands. She was on a voyage from Amsterdam to Lisbon, Portugal.

=== Unknown date ===
List of shipwrecks: Unknown date 1776
Ship	State	Description
Alice	Ireland	The ship was lost on the coast of Norway. She was on a voyage from Memel, Prussia to Dublin.
Dispatch	Great Britain	The ship was lost near Galway, Ireland. She was on a voyage from Limerick, Ireland to London.
Eagle	Ireland	The ship foundered in the Irish Sea off Wicklow. She was on a voyage from Bordeaux, France to Belfast, County Antrim.
Earl of Arundel	Great Britain	The ship was lost in the Orkney Islands. She was on a voyage from Portsmouth, Hampshire to Aberdeen.
Lucy	Great Britain	The ship ran aground on the North Bull. She was on a voyage from London to Dublin.
Marner	Great Britain	The ship was driven ashore at Pool, Dorset. She was on a voyage from Newcastle upon Tyne, Northumberland to Pool.
Nassau	Great Britain	The transport ship was lost near Dungeness, Kent. She was on a voyage from New York, United States to London.
Plain-dealing	Great Britain	The ship was driven ashore in the North Channel. She was on a voyage from Cork, Ireland to Falmouth, Cornwall.
Sally	Great Britain	The ship was lost in the Baltic Sea. She was on a voyage from Riga, Russia to Leith, Lothian.
Sophia Magdalena	France	The ship was lost at "Pontaron". She was on a voyage from Dublin to Bordeaux.

== Unknown date ==
List of shipwrecks: Unknown date 1776
Ship	State	Description
African Queen	Great Britain	The ship was lost at Bonny. She was on a voyage from Bristol, Gloucestershire to Bonny.
Amhurst	Great Britain	The ship was lost at Pensacola, Florida, British America.
Ask-again	Great Britain	The ship was lost in the Bay of Honduras.
Auckland	Great Britain	The whaler was sunk by ice.
Bosphorus	Great Britain	The victualling ship was lost in the Saint Lawrence River, British America.
Bryants	Great Britain	The ship foundered in the Atlantic Ocean. Her crew were rescued by Society (Great Britain). Bryants was on a voyage from Jamaica to London.
Catharine	Great Britain	The ship was lost at Senegal.
Ceres	France	The ship was driven ashore and wrecked at the Cape of Good Hope. Her crew were rescued.
Diana	Great Britain	The ship was lost on the Coromandel Coast, India.
Dolphin	(Kingdom of Great Britain) British America	The ship was lost near Halifax, Nova Scotia. She was on a voyage from Newfoundland to Halifax.
Elizabeth	Great Britain	The ship was lost near Kingston, Jamaica with the loss of a crew member. She was on a voyage from Madeira to Jamaica.
Euphrates	Great Britain	The transport ship foundered off Halifax. She was on a voyage from London to Halifax
Favourite	Great Britain	The transport ship foundered in the Gulf of St. Lawrence.
Fox	Great Britain	African slave trade: The ship was wrecked at Saint Thomas, Virgin Islands before 5 July.
Friendship	Great Britain	The ship was deliberately run ashore on the coast of "Alruzzo" after her crew mutinied and murdered her captain. She was on a voyage from Venice to Gallipoli, Ottoman Empire.
Friendship	Great Britain	The transport ship was wrecked on Cape Cod, Massachusetts British America.
Gaper	Dutch Republic	The transport ship sprang a leak and foundered. Her crew were rescued by Juffrow Johanna (Dutch Republic).
Generous Friends	Great Britain	The transport ship was lost near New York, United States.
Hercules	Ireland	The ship was wrecked on the Northern Triangles. She was on a voyage from the Bay of Honduras to Dublin
Hunter	Great Britain	The ship was driven ashore and wrecked at Dominica. She was on a voyage from the Leeward Islands to a British port.
Industry	France	The ship was lost at Barbados. She was on a voyage from Marseille to Barbados.
Inverness	Great Britain	American Revolutionary War: The ship was burnt at a port in Georgia, British America.
Judiane	France	The ship was lost whilst on a voyage from Bordeaux to Bengal, India.
Leghorn	Great Britain	American Revolutionary War: The galley was captured by an American privateer. She was taken in to Philadelphia, Pennsylvania, where she was burnt.
Lasseune	French Navy	The frigate foundered in the Indian Ocean off Madagascar with the loss of all but three of her crew.
Lion	Great Britain	The ship was lost on Cabo Catoche, New Spain. She was on a voyage from British Honduras to London.
Marquess of Narbourn	Great Britain	African slave trade: The ship was lost in the West Indies with the loss of a slave.
Mary & Jane	Great Britain	The ship was lost at Dominica.
Minehead	Great Britain	The ship was lost at Newfoundland.
Nelly	Great Britain	American Revolutionary War: The ship was burnt at a port in Georgia.
Reconnoisand	France	The ship was lost at Guadeloupe.
Sainte Marie	France	The ship foundered.
Samuel	Great Britain	The ship was lost on Cabo Catoche. She was on a voyage from British Honduras to New York, British America.
Roggebloom	Dutch Republic	The transport ship foundered in the Atlantic Ocean.
St George	Great Britain	The ship was wrecked on Red Island, in the Saint Lawrence River, British America.
Patty	Great Britain	African slave trade: The ship was lost at Barbados. Her slaves were rescued.
Rebecca	Great Britain	The ship was lost on the Colorados. Her crew were rescued. She was on a voyage from Jamaica to London.
St. Pierre	France	The ship foundered. Her crew were rescued by St. Lawrence (France). St. Pierre was on a voyage from Catalonia, Spain to Dunkirk.
Thomas	Great Britain	The ship foundered in the Atlantic Ocean. Her crew were rescued. She was on a voyage from London to Newfoundland.
Ulysses	Great Britain	The ship was lost in Gambia.
Union	Great Britain	The ship was wrecked at Durant's Island, Newfoundland.
