= Providence Hospital =

Providence Hospital may refer to:

- Providence Hospital (Columbia, South Carolina)
- USA Health Providence Hospital in Mobile, Alabama
- Providence Hospital (Southfield), Michigan
- Providence Hospital (Washington, D.C.) in Washington, D.C.
- Providence Alaska Medical Center in Anchorage, Alaska
- Providence Behavioral Health Hospital in Holyoke, Massachusetts
- Providence Continuing Care Centre in Kingston, Ontario
- Providence Holy Cross Medical Center in Mission Hills, California
- Providence Lying-In Hospital in Providence, Rhode Island
- Providence Newberg Medical Center in Newberg, Oregon
- Providence Portland Medical Center in Portland, Oregon
- Providence Sacred Heart Medical Center and Children's Hospital, in and around Spokane, Washington
- Providence Saint Joseph Medical Center in Burbank, California
- Providence St. Peter Hospital in Olympia, Washington
- Providence St. Vincent Medical Center in Portland, Oregon
- Providence Tarzana Medical Center in Tarzana, California
- Providence Willamette Falls Medical Center in Oregon City, Oregon
- The Hospitals of Providence (Providence Memorial Hospital) in El Paso, Texas

== See also ==
- Provident Hospital (disambiguation)
- Providence Healthcare (disambiguation)
