= USS Queen of France =

History

United States
- Name: USS Queen of France ex "la Brune"
- Acquired: 1777
- Fate: Scuttled to avoid capture, 11 May 1780

General characteristics
- Type: Frigate
- Tonnage: 581 tons
- Armament: 28 guns 24 × 6-pounder guns

Service record
- Commanders: Capt. Joseph Olney; Capt. John Rathbun
- Operations: Siege of Charleston

USS Queen of France was a 28-gun frigate of the Continental Navy. She was named for Marie Antoinette. Queen of France was an old ship purchased in France in 1777 by American commissioners, Benjamin Franklin and Silas Deane, and fitted out as a 28-gun frigate. She was in Boston Harbor by December 1778.

In a squadron commanded by Captain John Burroughs Hopkins, Queen of France, commanded by Captain Joseph Olney, departed Boston, Massachusetts 13 March 1779. She cruised along the Atlantic coast as far south as Charleston, South Carolina, to destroy small armed vessels operating out of New York to prey upon American shipping. Near dawn 6 April, some 16 miles east of Cape Henry, Virginia, they sighted schooner Hibernia, a 10-gun privateer, and took her after a short chase. At about the same time the next morning, the American warships saw a fleet of 9 sails and pursued them until catching their quarry that afternoon. Ship Jason, mounting 20 guns and carrying 150 men, headed the list of seven prizes that day, including also ship Meriah — carrying 10 six pounders and richly laden with provisions and cavalry equipment — brigs Patriot, Prince Ferdinand, John, and Batchelor, and finally schooner Chance. Hopkins ordered his ships home with their prizes, and Queen of France reached Boston with Maria, Hibernia, and three brigs on the 20th.

While Queen of France was in Boston, Captain John Rathbun relieved Capt. Olney in command of the frigate. She sailed 18 June with Providence and Ranger. She fell in with the British Jamaica Fleet of some 150 ships near the Grand Banks of Newfoundland about the middle of July. In the dense fog, the American warships pretended to be British frigates of the convoy’s escort and, sending boarding parties across by boats, quietly took possession of two West Indiamen before slipping away at night. They proceeded to capture nine more British vessels off the Grand Banks of Newfoundland. Three of the eleven prizes were later recaptured, but the remaining eight which reached Boston with the squadron late in August were sold for over a million dollars.

Queen of France departed Boston with frigates Providence and Boston, and sloop Ranger, on 23 November and cruised east of Bermuda. They took 12-gun privateer Dolphin on 5 December before arriving Charleston, on the 23rd. Queen of France was scuttled at Charleston to avoid falling into British hands when that city surrendered 11 May 1780.
