= Providence (ship) =

Providence may refer to a number of ships:

- Providence served the East India Company between 1637 and 1639.
- Providence (1693 ship), of 250 tons (bm), was launched on the River Thames in 1693. On 27 October 1693 the EIC accepted Providence for charter following a survey. However, the ship is usually referred to as Provident on EIC service.
- Providence (1788 ship), of 238 tons (bm), was launched at New Brunswick. In 1791–1792 she made one voyage to the British southern whale fishery.
- Providence (1790 ship) was launched in 1790 at South Shields. She initially traded with Saint Petersburg but then in 1804 the British Royal Navy hired her. She remained in Royal Navy service until towards the end of 1812. She disappears from the registers between 1812 and 1820, and between 1835 and 1850. She was wrecked in 1869 and broken up in 1870.
- Providence (1807 ship), a sailing ship built at Calcutta that made three voyages for the British East India Company, including one transporting convicts to New South Wales. She was either lost or broken up in 1833.
- Providence (1812 ship), a 380-ton sailing ship built at Lynn in 1812 that twice transported convicts to Tasmania, and that was wrecked in January 1828.
- Providence (1866 steamboat), a 2,962-gross register ton sidewheel steamer built at New York in 1866

== See also ==
- HMS Providence, the name of several Royal Navy ships
- USS Providence, the name of several U.S. Navy ships
