= PROV =

PROV or prov, may refer for:

- Public Record Office Victoria (PROV), the government archives of the Australian State of Victoria
- W3C Prov, a family of data provenance specifications produced by W3C
- Book of Proverbs (Prov.) of the Christian Bible
- Prov Sadovsky (1818–1872), a Russian actor who founded the Sadovsky theatrical family
- Providence University College and Theological Seminary (prov.ca), Otterburne, Manitoba, Canada
- Provenance (prov.)
- Providence (disambiguation) (prov.)
- Province (prov.)
- Proverb (prov.)

== See also ==
- Pantene Pro V
