= New Providence (disambiguation) =

New Providence is an island in the Bahamas.

New Providence may also refer to:

- New Providence, Iowa
- New Providence, New Jersey
- New Providence, Pennsylvania, a community
- New Providence (horse)

== See also ==
- Providence (disambiguation)
