= HMS Providence =

Eleven ships of the Royal Navy have been named HMS Providence. Another was intended to bear the name:

== Ships with the name ==
- English ship Providence (1637) was a 30-gun ship launched in 1637 and wrecked in 1668.
- HMS Providence (1665) was a 6-gun fireship purchased in 1665 and sunk in action in 1666.
- HMS Providence (1672) was a 6-gun fireship purchased in 1672 and lost in 1673.
- HMS Providence (1678) was an 8-gun fireship purchased in 1678 and sold in 1686.
- HMS Providence (1779) was a 12-gun sloop captured from the Americans in 1779 and listed until 1780.
- HMS Providence (1780) was a 28-gun fifth-rate, previously the American USS Providence. She was captured in 1780 and sold in 1784.
- HMS Providence (1782) was a 16-gun storeship purchased in 1782 and sold in 1784.
- HMS Providence (1791) was a 12-gun sloop launched in 1791 and wrecked in 1797.
- HMS Providence (1796) was a 14-gun schooner purchased in 1796 and expended as a fireship in 1804.
- HMS Providence was to have been a cutter tender. She was launched as HMS Quail (1817) in 1817, but was ordered to be renamed HMS Providence in 1822. The renaming was cancelled however.
- HMS Providence (1866) was a Coastguard cutter launched in 1866 and sold in 1870.
- HMS Providence (J325) was an Algerine-class minesweeper built as HMCS Forrest Hill but renamed before being launched in 1943. She was scrapped in 1958.

== In popular culture ==
- In the 2011 film Pirates of the Caribbean: On Stranger Tides, the fictional HMS Providence appears as Hector Barbossa's privateer frigate. That ship was played by HMS Surprise.
- In Assassin's Creed III the ship that takes the protagonist, Haytham Kenway, to Boston is a British merchant ship named Providence.

== See also ==
- HMS Providence Prize was a ketch captured from the French in 1691 and recaptured by them in 1707.
