= USS Congress (1777) =

History

United States
- Ordered: 1775
- Builder: Lancaster Burling
- Out of service: 1777
- Fate: burned to prevent capture by the British in 1777

General characteristics
- Type: 28-gun frigate
- Length: 126 ft (38 m) (between perpendiculars)
- Beam: 34 ft 10 in (10.62 m)
- Depth of hold: 10 ft 6 in (3.20 m)
- Propulsion: sail
- Armament: 26 × 12-pounder guns; 2 × 6-pounder guns

USS Congress was a 28-gun frigate of the Continental Navy that was scheduled to participate in the American Revolutionary War against the British. However, while being outfitted prior to her first sailing, the British approached and the Americans set her afire in order to prevent her capture.

== Service history ==
Congress was a sailing frigate built by Lancaster Burling at Poughkeepsie, New York, under authority of an act of the Second Continental Congress, dated 13 December 1775. One of the first 13 ships authorized to be built by the new government, she was placed under the command of Captain Grenell in the summer of 1776. Before her outfitting was completed, the British occupied the approaches to the Hudson River and extended their control of the environs throughout 1777. The Continental Navy burned Congress in October 1777 to prevent her capture by the British.
