= HMS Quail (1817) =

British naval cutter or schooner (1817–1829)

History

United Kingdom
- Name: HMS Quail
- Ordered: 23 May 1816
- Builder: Deptford Dockyard (M/shipwright William Stone)
- Laid down: August 1816
- Launched: 3 January 1817
- Fate: Break up completed 8 April 1829

General characteristics
- Class & type: Quail-class schooners
- Tons burthen: 8261/94 (bm)
- Length: Overall:55 ft 8 in (17.0 m); Keel:44 ft 7 1/8 in (13.6 m)
- Beam: 18 ft 7 in (5.7 m)
- Depth of hold: 7 ft 6 in (2.3 m)
- Sail plan: Cutter
- Complement: 30
- Armament: 4 × 12-pounder carronades + 2 × 1/2-pounder swivel guns

HMS Quail was launched at Deptford in 1817 as the name ship of her class of schooners. She herself may have been cutter-rigged. She was broken up in 1829.

Between 14 December 1819 and 14 January 1821 Quail served as a ship's tender to HMS Albion. She made a number of seizures of smugglers and their vessels. (Note: Prize money was paid in June 1821. A first-class share, that of Albion's captain, was £88 12s 4d; a sixth-class share, that of an ordinary seaman on Albion, was worth £1 11s 3 3/4d. At the same time, a second class share for the lieutenant commanding Quail was worth £25 16s 10 1/4d; a sixth-class share for an ordinary seaman on Quail was worth £2 10s 11 1/4d.) For other seizures made between 28 December 1820 and 13 December 1821 prize money was paid in June 1822. (Note: A first-class share on Albion was worth £32 16s 9d and a sixth-class share was worth 10s 9d. A second-class share on Quail was worth £8 15s 1 1/4d and a sixth-class share was worth 7s 4 3/4d.) The next payment was for seizures between 23 February and 10 May 1822. (Note: A first-class share on Albion was worth £6 19s 11d and a sixth-class share was worth 2s 5 1/4d. A second-class share on Quail was worth £1 17s 3 1/2d and a sixth-class share was worth 3s 9 3/4d.) The last payment was for seizures between 9 September 1822 and 10 December 1823. (Note: A first-class share on Albion was worth £17 7s 6d and a sixth-class share was worth 4s 2 1/4d. A second-class share on Quail was worth £1 8s 7d and a sixth-class share was worth 6s 1 1/2d.)

On 31 January 1822 the Admiralty ordered Quail be renamed Providence; it rescinded the order on 11 April 1822.

Disposal: The "Principal Officers and Commissioners of His Majesty's Navy" offered the "Quail cutter, of 82 tons", "lying at Portsmouth" for sale on 11 July 1827. She did not sell then or on a number of later offer dates. She was finally broken up on 8 April 1829.
