= USS Providence (1776 frigate) =

History

United States
- Name: USS Providence
- Builder: Silvester Bowes, Providence, Rhode Island
- Launched: May 1776
- Fate: Captured 12 May 1780

Great Britain
- Name: HMS Providence
- Acquired: 12 May 1780
- Fate: Sold, March 1783

General characteristics
- Type: Frigate
- Displacement: 632 long tons (642 t)
- Length: 126 ft 6 in (38.56 m)
- Beam: 33 ft 8 in (10.26 m)
- Depth of hold: 10 ft 5 in (3.18 m)
- Complement: 170
- Armament: 26 × 12-pounder guns 6 × 4-pounders guns

Service record
- Commanders: Capt. Abraham Whipple

USS Providence was a 32-gun frigate of the Continental Navy. Built by Silvester Bowes at Providence, Rhode Island by order of the Continental Congress, she was launched in May 1776.

After being blockaded in the Providence River for more than a year, the new frigate, under command of Captain Abraham Whipple, ran the British blockade on the night of 30 April 1778, returning the heavy fire of the British frigate HMS Lark and damaging that vessel, killing 3 of her crew and wounding 17, firing on frigate HMS Juno and damaging a tender that was sent to dock in Newport, Rhode Island, where it sank. She sailed directly for France, arriving at Paimboeuf 30 May to procure guns and supplies for Continental Navy vessels under construction. During the voyage she captured brigantine "Lord Grossvenor" at (40°00′N 10°00′W). Three days later Grossvenor was recaptured by Letter of Marque "Nancy" and then retaken by Providence. She sailed from Paimboeuf 8 August and six days later, joined frigate Boston at Brest, France. The two ships sailed back to America 22 August. They took 3 prizes on the return voyage and Providence arrived Portsmouth, New Hampshire, 15 October.

Transferred to Boston to seek a crew, Providence sailed from Boston 18 June 1779 as flagship of Commodore Abraham Whipple, cruising eastward in company with Ranger and Queen of France. In the early morning of mid-July, the squadron was in a dense fog off the banks of Newfoundland and fell in with a Jamaican fleet of some 150 sails. The vessels remained with the enemy fleet all day without causing alarm. They took 11 prizes, many by quietly sending boats to take possession. The squadron slipped away with their prizes during the night. They sent 8 of the prizes, valued together with their cargo at over a million dollars, into Boston and Cape Ann. The Squadron returned to Boston and 23 November sailed from Nantasket Roads, first cruising eastward of Bermuda, arriving at Charleston, South Carolina 23 December to defend that city.

Providence, with other ships of Commodore Whipple's Squadron remained for the defense of Charleston and was one of the ships taken by British when that city fell, 12 May 1780. She subsequently served in the Royal Navy until sold in March 1783.

== See also ==
- List of sailing frigates of the United States Navy
