= James Forbes (statesman) =

American politician

Member of the Maryland House of Delegates
- In office 1777–1778

Personal details
- Born: c. 1731 Maryland, Great Britain
- Died: 25 March 1780 (aged c. 49) Philadelphia, Pennsylvania, United States
- Resting place: Philadelphia, Pennsylvania, United States

James Forbes (c. 1731 – March 25, 1780) was an American statesman from Maryland. He served as a delegate to the Continental Congress from 1777 to 1780.

He served as a State Court Judge in 1770 and was a member of the Maryland State House of Delegates from 1777 to 1778.

Forbes died while attending a session of Congress in Philadelphia, where he is buried in the Christ Church Burial Ground.
