= John Burroughs Hopkins =

- Born: July 25, 1742; Newport, Rhode Island
- Died: December 5, 1796 (aged 54)
- Burial place: North Burial Ground; Providence, Rhode Island
- Military career
- Branch: Continental Navy
- Rank: Captain
- Conflicts: Gaspee Affair; American Revolutionary War

John Burroughs Hopkins (July 25, 1742 – December 5, 1796) was a captain of the Continental Navy during the American Revolutionary War.

== Biography ==
Hopkins was born in Newport, Rhode Island, the son of Continental navy commander-in-chief Esek Hopkins. John Hopkins was one of seven commanders involved in the Gaspée Affair, in which HMS Gaspée was burnt. This was one of the leading causes of the Revolutionary War. John B. Hopkins was made one of five captains under his father according to in, December 1775, the United States Congress Marine Committee's meeting to discuss ranking the officers. He served in distinction during the war, the Providence Gazette, on March 12, 1796, called him an "eminent nautical commander".
