= Provident Hospital =

Provident Hospital may refer to:

- Provident Hospital (Baltimore)
- Provident Hospital of Cook County
- Provident Hospital (Fort Lauderdale)
