= Continental Navy =

American navy of the Revolutionary War period (1775–1785)

- Seal of the U.S. Board of Admiralty, adopted in 1780.
- Active: 1775–1785
- Country: United Colonies (1775–1776); United States (1776–1785)
- Type: Navy
- Engagements: American Revolutionary War

Commanders
- Chairman of the Naval Committee (1775–1776): John Adams
- Commander-in-Chief (1775–1778): Esek Hopkins
- Notable commanders: John Paul Jones; John Barry

Insignia
- Naval jack

The Continental Navy was the navy of the United Colonies and United States from 1775 to 1785. It was founded on October 13, 1775 by the Continental Congress to fight against British forces and their allies as part of the American Revolutionary War. In 1776, Commodore Esek Hopkins was appointed by Congress to command the navy. Due to the efforts of several prominent patrons such as John Adams, the Continental Navy eventually developed into a substantial force, though it never replicated the successes of the Continental Army.

Initially, the Continental Navy's ships consisted of purchased merchantmen, due to a lack of funds for constructing purpose-built warships. This resulted from American leaders focusing on the Continental Army, as they were aware that the Royal Navy's command of the sea meant no naval force they raised could hope to seriously challenge it. The primary missions of the Continental Navy, which eventually acquired a series of frigates and smaller warships, were to raid British shipping and colonies to acquire supplies for use by American troops along with defending US commerce.

The Continental Navy was unable to make a significant impact on the war's outcome, and many of its ships were lost to British naval attacks, accidents, or bad weather. However, it produced a corps of skilled naval officers who would go on to fight in the Quasi-War, Barbary Wars and War of 1812. The Revolutionary War ended with an American victory in 1783, and two years later the Continental Navy was disbanded by Congress. On March 27, 1794, the United States Navy was officially established, inheriting many of the Continental Navy's traditions.

== Congressional oversight of construction ==
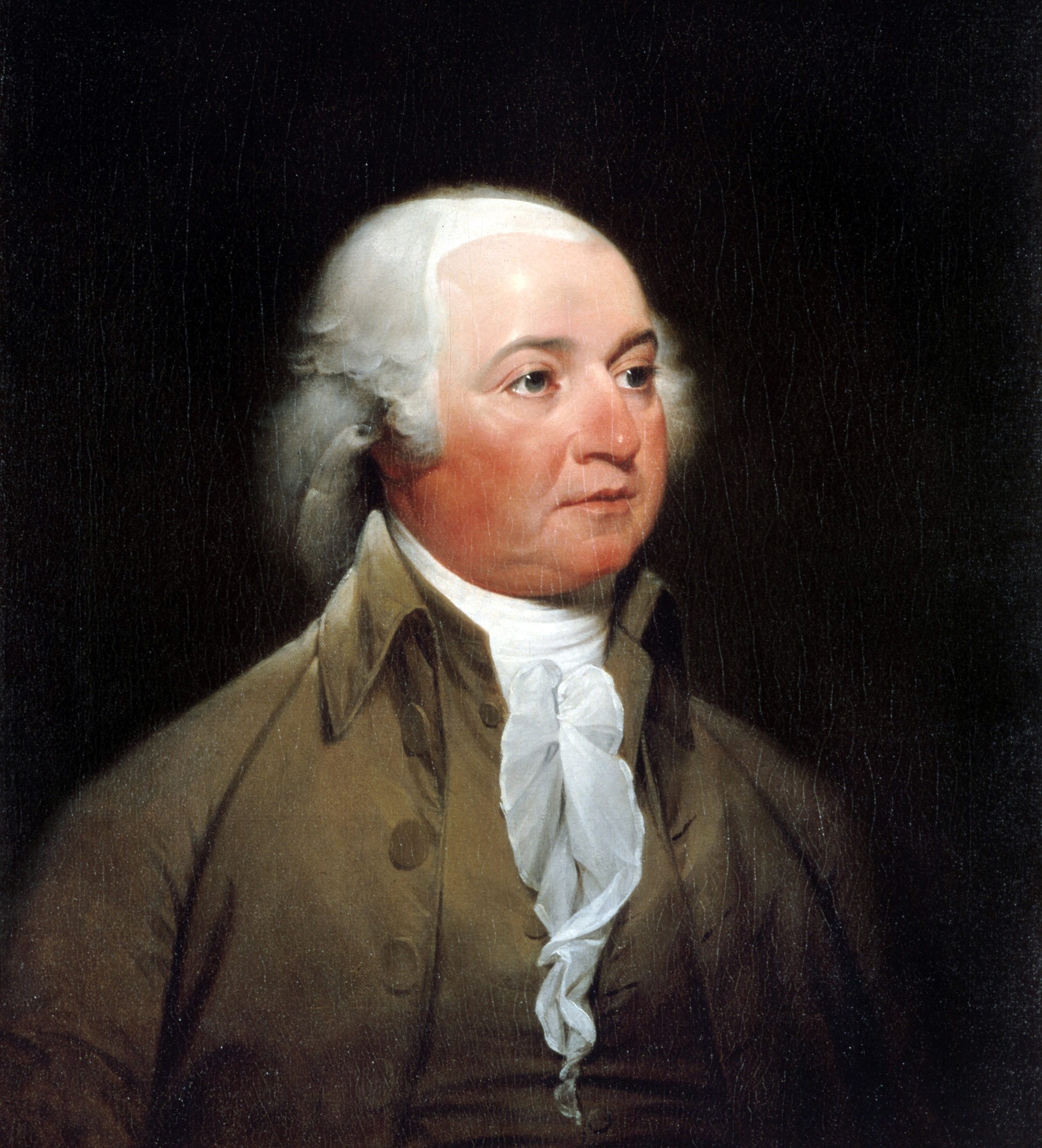
John Adams took an active role in the formation of the navy and the drafting of suitable operational regulations. Painting by John Trumbull, c. 1792–93.

The original intent of the Continental Navy was to intercept the supply of arms and provisions to British forces, which had placed Boston under martial law. George Washington had already informed Congress that he had assumed command of several ships for this purpose, and individual governments of various colonies had outfitted their own warships. The first formal movement for a navy came from Rhode Island, whose State Assembly passed a resolution on August 26, 1775, instructing its delegates to Congress to introduce legislation calling "for building at the Continental expense a fleet of sufficient force, for the protection of these colonies, and for employing them in such a manner and places as will most effectively annoy our enemies...." The measure in the Continental Congress was met with much derision, especially on the part of Maryland delegate Samuel Chase who exclaimed it to be "the maddest idea in the world." John Adams later recalled, "The opposition... was very loud and vehement. It was... represented as the most wild, visionary, mad project that had ever been imagined. It was an infant taking a mad bull by his horns."

During this time, however, the issue arose of Quebec-bound British supply ships carrying desperately needed provisions that could otherwise benefit the Continental Army. The Continental Congress appointed Silas Deane and John Langdon to draft a plan to seize ships from the convoy in question.

== Creation ==
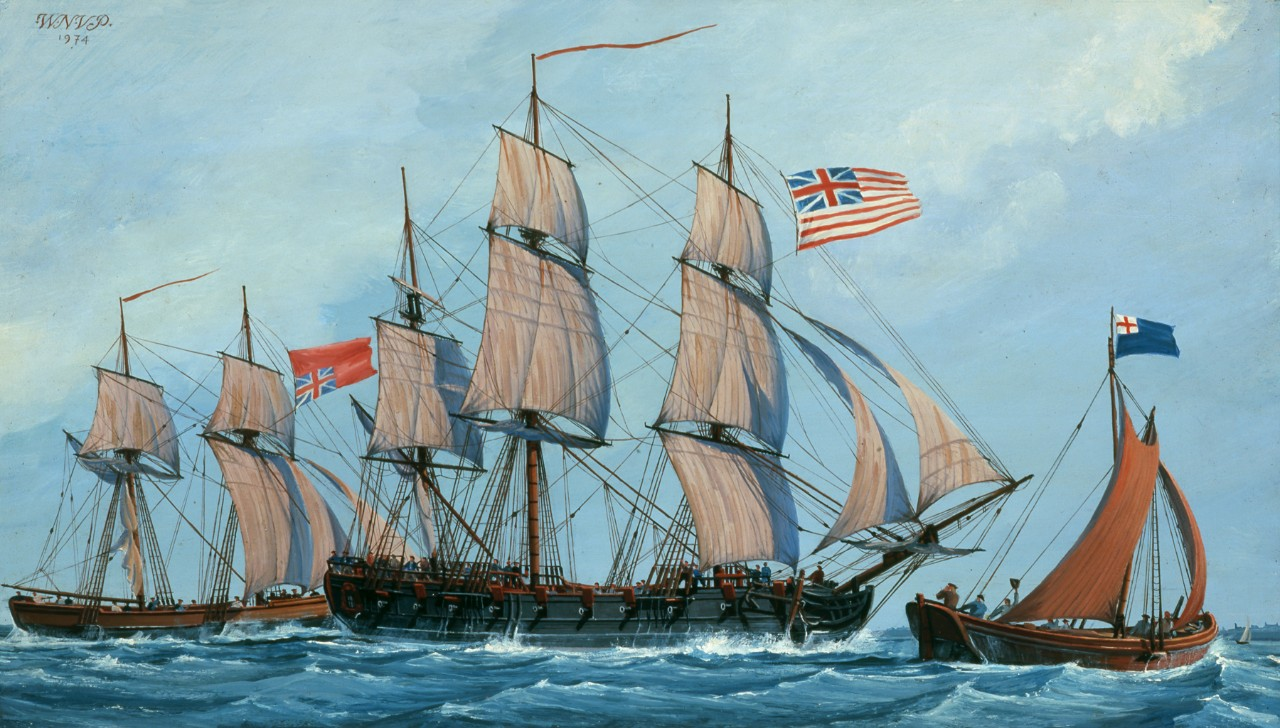
The Continental Navy frigate Columbus with the captured British brig Lord Lifford off New England, 1776

On June 12, 1775, the Rhode Island General Assembly, meeting at East Greenwich, passed a resolution creating a navy for the colony of Rhode Island. The same day, Governor Nicholas Cooke signed orders addressed to Captain Abraham Whipple, commander of the sloop Katy and commodore of the armed vessels employed by the government.

The first formal movement for the creation of a Continental navy came from Rhode Island because its merchants' shipping activities, including illegal smuggling, had been increasingly policed by several years by the Royal Navy. On August 26, 1775, Rhode Island General Assembly passed a resolution that there be a single Continental fleet funded by the Continental Congress. The resolution was introduced in the Continental Congress on October 3, 1775, but was tabled. In the meantime, George Washington had begun to acquire ships, starting with the schooner Hannah which was chartered by Washington from merchant and Continental Army Lt. Colonel John Glover of Marblehead, Massachusetts. Hannah was commissioned and launched on September 5, 1775, under the command of Captain Nicholson Broughton from the port of Beverly, Massachusetts.

Resolved, That a swift sailing vessel, to carry ten carriage guns, and a proportionable number of swivels, with eighty men, be fitted, with all possible despatch, for a cruise of three months, and that the commander be instructed to cruize eastward, for intercepting such transports as may be laden with warlike stores and other supplies for our enemies, and for such other purposes as the Congress shall direct.
That a Committee of three be appointed to prepare an estimate of the expence, and lay the same before the Congress, and to contract with proper persons to fit out the vessel.
Resolved, that another vessel be fitted out for the same purposes, and that the said committee report their opinion of a proper vessel, and also an estimate of the expence.

— Resolution of the Continental Congress that marked the establishment of what is now the United States Navy.

The United States Navy decided in 1971 to recognize October 13, 1775 as the date of its official establishment, the passage of the resolution of the Continental Congress at Philadelphia that created the Continental Navy. On this day, Congress authorized the purchase of two vessels to be armed for a cruise against British merchant ships; these ships became Andrew Doria and Cabot. The first ship in commission was USS Alfred which was purchased on November 4 and commissioned on December 3 by Captain Dudley Saltonstall. On November 10, 1775, the Continental Congress passed a resolution calling for two battalions of Marines to be raised for service with the fleet. John Adams drafted its first governing regulations, which were adopted by Congress on November 28, 1775, and remained in effect throughout the Revolutionary War. The Rhode Island resolution was reconsidered by the Continental Congress and was passed on December 13, 1775, authorizing the building of thirteen frigates within the next three months: five ships of 32 guns, five with 28 guns, and three with 24 guns.

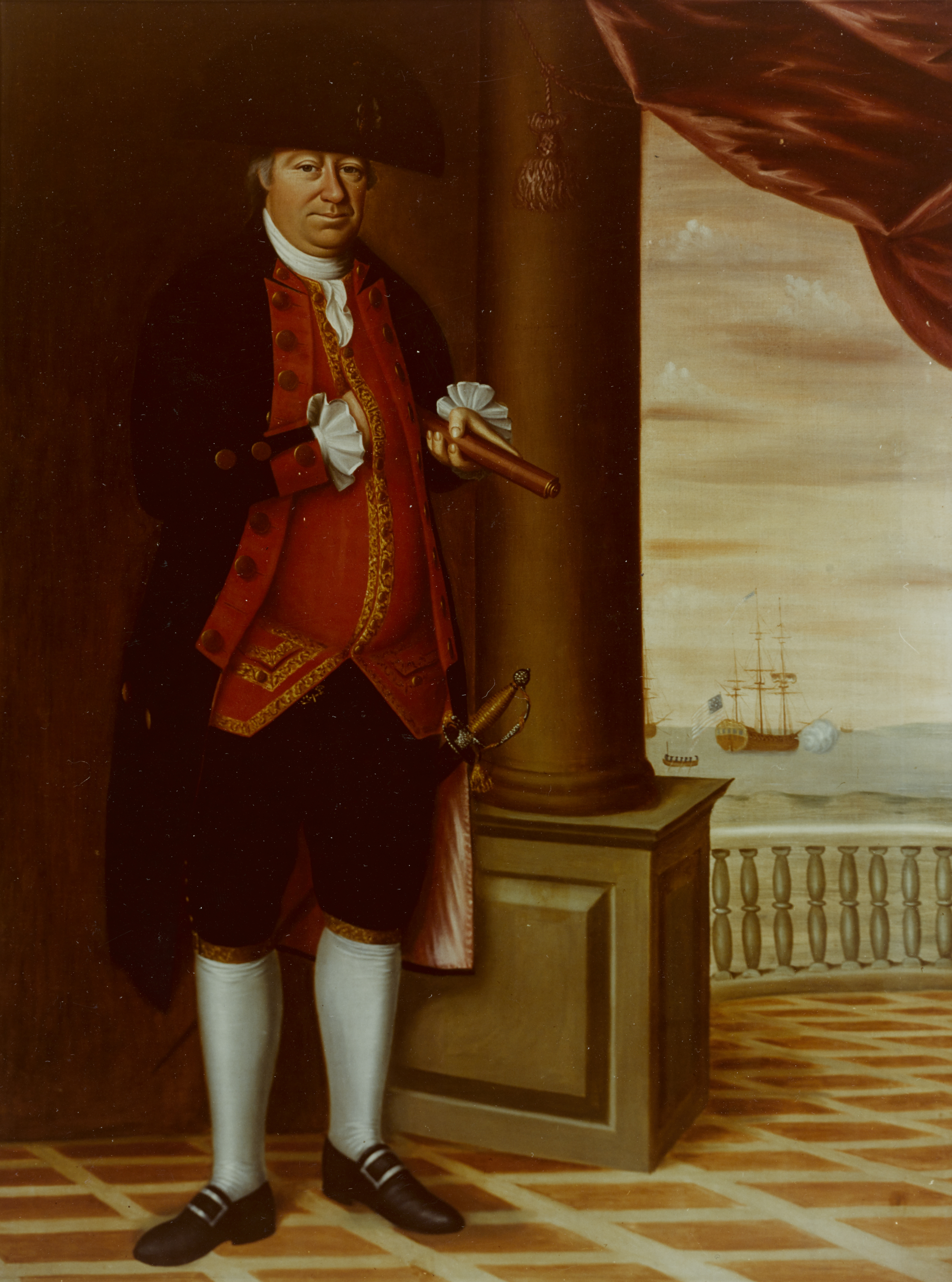
Abraham Whipple painting by Edward Savage

When it came to selecting commanders for ships, Congress tended to be split evenly between merit and patronage. Among those who were selected for political reasons were Esek Hopkins, Dudley Saltonstall, and Esek Hopkins' son John Burroughs Hopkins. However, Abraham Whipple, Nicholas Biddle, and John Paul Jones managed to be appointed with backgrounds in marine warfare. On December 22, 1775, Esek Hopkins was appointed the naval commander-in-chief, and officers of the navy were commissioned. Saltonstall, Biddle, Hopkins, and Whipple were commissioned as captains of the Alfred, Andrew Doria, Cabot, and Columbus, respectively.

Hopkins led the first major naval action of the Continental Navy in early March 1776 with this small fleet, complemented by Providence (12), Wasp (8), and Hornet (10). The battle occurred at Nassau, Bahamas where stores of much-needed gunpowder were seized for the use of the Continental Army. However, success was diluted with the appearance of disease spreading from ship to ship.

On April 6, 1776, the squadron, with the addition of Fly (8), unsuccessfully encountered the 20-gun HMS Glasgow in the first major sea battle of the Continental Navy. Hopkins failed to give any substantive orders other than to recall the fleet from the engagement, a move which Captain Nicholas Biddle described: "away we all went helter, skelter, one flying here, another there."

On Lake Champlain, Benedict Arnold ordered the construction of 12 war vessels to slow down the British fleet that was invading New York from Canada. The British fleet destroyed Arnold's fleet, but the US fleet managed to slow down the British after a two-day battle, known as the Battle of Valcour Island, and managed to slow the progression of the British Army.

As the war progressed, states began directing more resources toward naval pursuits. During the inaugural session of the Virginia General Assembly, the senate began acquiring lands for naval manufacturing. Charles O. Paullin states that "no other state owned as much land, properties, and manufactories devoted to naval purposes as Virginia. Sampson Mathews oversaw the operation stationed at Warwick on the James River, the most important of the works, which produced much sail material from flax grown in his home county of Augusta, as there was no money available to buy linen cloth for sails.

== The thirteen frigates ==
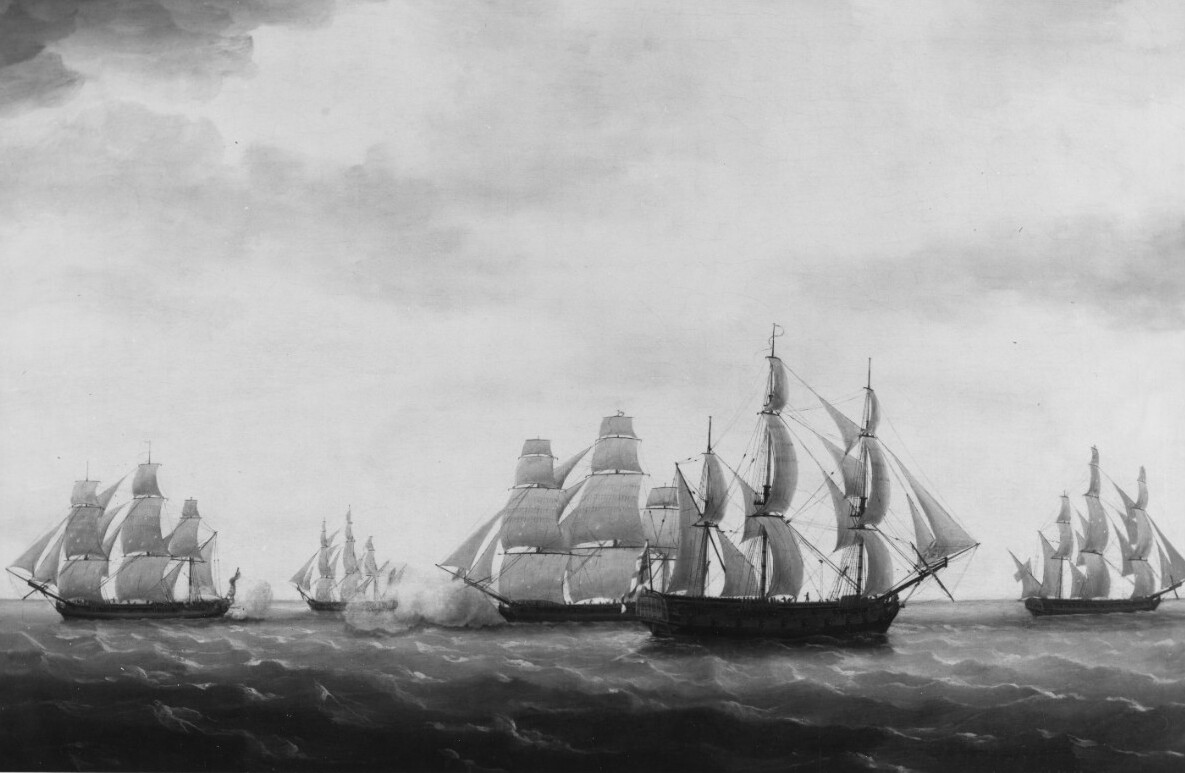
The capture of USS Hancock on 9 July 1779

By December 13, 1775, Congress had authorized the construction of 13 new frigates, rather than refitting merchantmen to increase the fleet. Five ships (Hancock, Raleigh, Randolph, Warren, and Washington) were to be rated 32 guns, five (Effingham, Montgomery, Providence, Trumbull, and Virginia) 28 guns, and three (Boston, Congress, and Delaware) 24 guns. Only eight frigates made it to sea and their effectiveness was limited; they were completely outmatched by the Royal Navy, and nearly all were captured or sunk by 1781.

Washington, Effingham, Congress, and Montgomery were scuttled or burned in October and November 1777 before going to sea to prevent their capture by the British. USS Virginia, commanded by Captain James Nicholson, made a number of unsuccessful attempts to break through the blockade of Chesapeake Bay. On March 31, 1778, in another attempt, she ran aground near Hampton Roads, where her captain went ashore. Shortly after, HMS Emerald and Conqueror appeared on the scene to accept her surrender.

Guarding American commerce and raiding British commerce and supply were the principal duties of the Continental Navy. Privateers had some success, with 1,697 letters of marque being issued by Congress. Individual states, American agents in Europe and in the Caribbean also issued commissions; taking duplications into account more than 2,000 commissions were issued by the various authorities. Lloyd's of London estimated that 2,208 British ships were taken by American privateers, amounting to the equivalent of $66 million in modern currency.

Most of the eight frigates that went to sea took multiple prizes and had semi-successful cruises before their captures, however, there were exceptions. On September 27, 1777, Delaware participated in a delaying action on the Delaware River against the British army pursuing George Washington's forces. The ebb tide arrived and left the Delaware stranded, leading to her capture. Warren was blockaded in Providence, Rhode Island, shortly after her completion, and did not break out of the blockade until March 8, 1778. After a successful cruise under Captain John Burroughs Hopkins, she was assigned to the ill-fated Penobscot Expedition under Captain Dudley Saltonstall, where she was trapped by the British and burned on August 15, 1779, to prevent her capture. Hancock, captained by John Manley, managed to capture two merchantmen as well as the Royal Navy vessel HMS Fox. Later on July 8, 1777, however, the Hancock was captured by HMS Rainbow of a pursuing squadron, and became the British man of war Iris.

Randolph took five prizes in her early cruises. On March 7, 1778, she was escorting a convoy of merchantmen when the British 64-gun ship HMS Yarmouth bore down on the convoy. Randolph, under the command of Captain Nicholas Biddle came to the defense of the merchantmen and engaged the heavily superior foe. In the ensuing engagement, the two ships were both severely manhandled but in the course of the action, the magazine of the Randolph exploded causing the destruction of the entire vessel and all but four of her crew. The falling debris from the explosion severely damaged the Yarmouth enough that she could no longer pursue the American ships.

Raleigh, under the command of Captain John Barry, captured three prizes before being run aground in action on September 27, 1778. Her crew scuttled her, but she was raised by the British who refloated her for further use in the name of the Crown.

Boston, under the command of Captains Hector McNeill and Samuel Tucker, had captured 17 prizes in earlier cruises and had carried John Adams to France in February and March 1778. She was captured (along with the frigate Providence which had taken 14 prizes in her own service under Captain Abraham Whipple) in the fall of Charleston, South Carolina on May 12, 1780.

The final frigate to meet her end of Continental service was Trumbull. Trumbull, which had not gone to sea until September 1779 under James Nicholson, had gained acclaim in bloody action against the Letter of Marque Watt. On August 28, 1781, she met HMS Iris and General Monk and engaged. In the action, Trumbull was forced to surrender to the former American naval vessels (the General Monk was the captured Rhode Island privateer General Washington, itself recaptured in April 1782 and placed in service with the Continental Navy).

== French naval collaboration ==
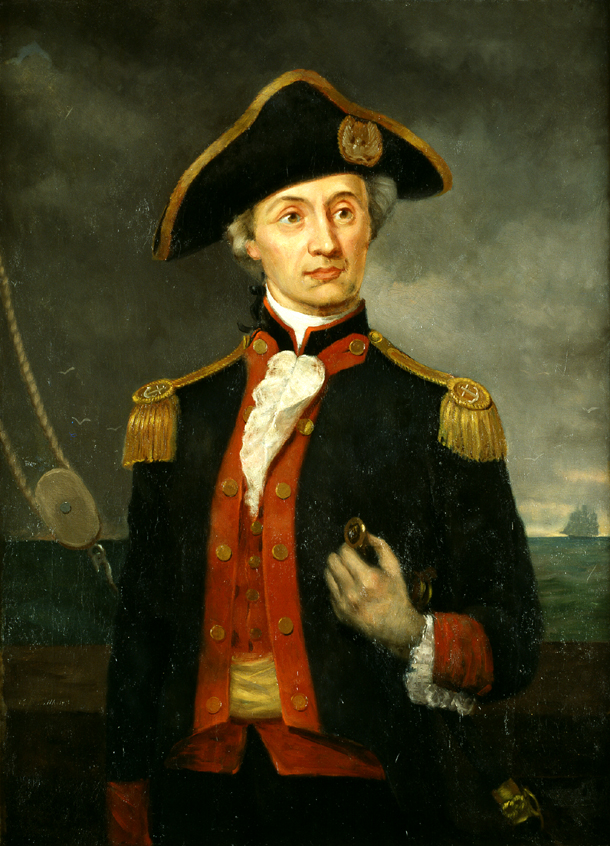
John Paul Jones, the Continental Navy's first seaman to be appointed the rank of 1st Lieutenant. Oil painting by George Bagby Matthews, c. 1890.

Before the Franco-American Alliance, the royalist French government attempted to maintain a state of respectful neutrality during the Revolutionary War. That being said, the nation maintained neutrality at face value, often openly harboring Continental vessels and supplying their needs.

With the presence of American diplomats Benjamin Franklin and Silas Deane, the Continental Navy gained a permanent link to French affairs. Through Franklin and like-minded agents, Continental officers were afforded the ability to receive commissions and to survey and purchase prospective ships for military use.

Early in the conflict, Captains Lambert Wickes and Gustavus Conyngham operated out of various French ports for the purpose of commerce raiding. The French did attempt to enforce their neutrality by seizing Dolphin and Surprise of the Continental Navy. However, with the commencement of the official alliance in 1778, ports were officially open to Continental ships.

The most prominent Continental officer to operate out of France was Captain John Paul Jones. Jones had been preying upon British commerce aboard Ranger but only now saw the opportunity for higher command. The French loaned Jones the merchantman Duc de Duras, which Jones refitted and renamed Bonhomme Richard as a more powerful replacement for the Ranger. In August 1779, Jones was given command of a squadron of vessels of both American and French ownership. The goal was not only to harass British commerce but also to prospectively land 1,500 French regulars in the lightly guarded western regions of Britain. Unfortunately for the ambitious Jones, the French pulled out of the agreement pertaining to an invasion force, but the French did manage to uphold the plan regarding his command of the naval squadron. Sailing in a clockwise fashion around Ireland and down the east coast of Britain, the squadron captured a number of merchantmen. French commander Landais decided early on in the expedition to retain control of the French ships, thereby often leaving and rejoining the effort when he felt that it was fortuitous.

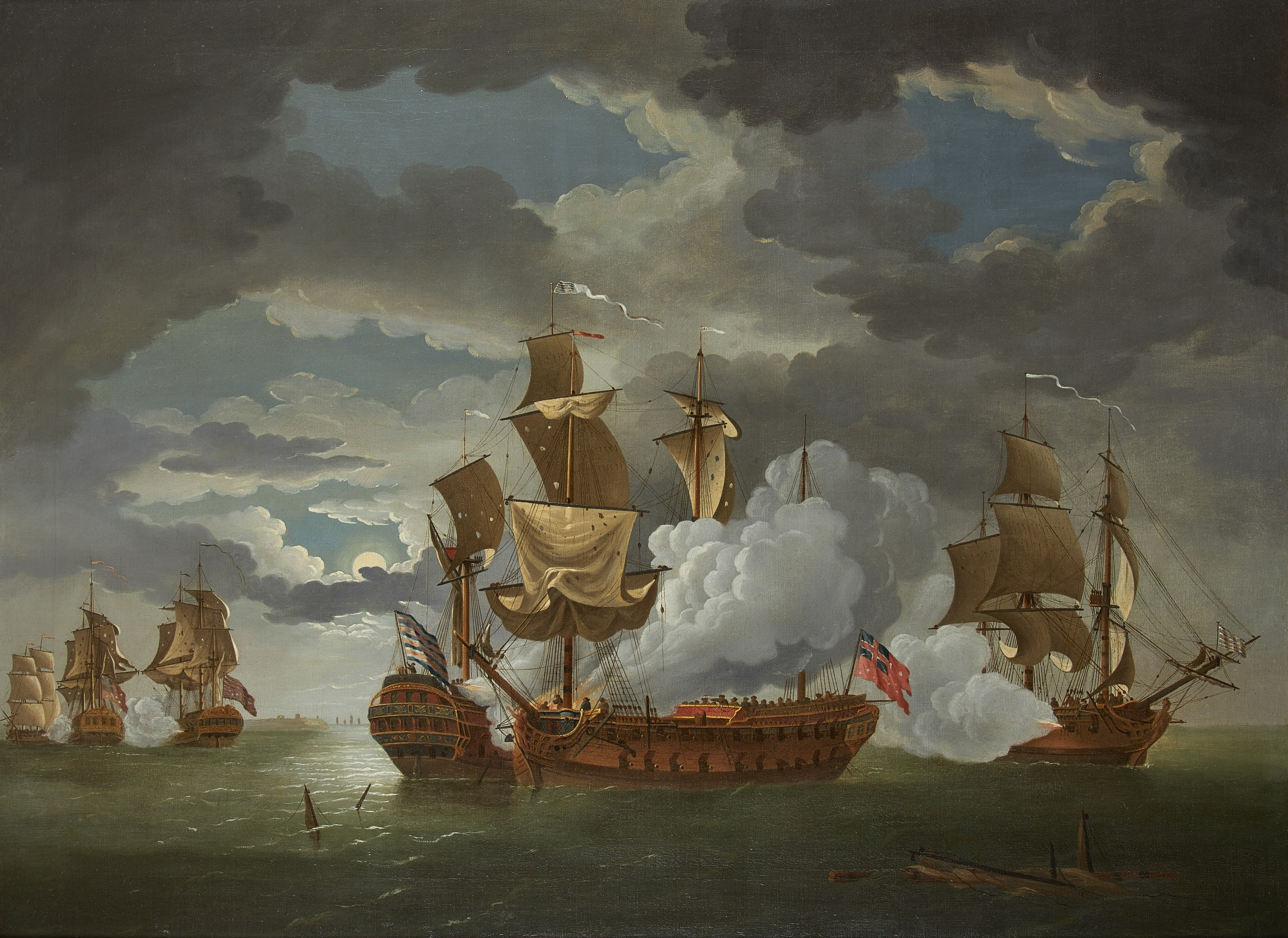
The Franco-American squadron closely engages the pair of British frigates on September 23, 1779.

On September 23, 1779, Jones' squadron was off Flamborough Head when the British man-of-war HMS Serapis and HM hired armed ship Countess of Scarborough bore down on the Franco-American force. The lone Continental frigate Bonhomme Richard engaged Serapis. The rigging of the two ships became entangled during the combat, and several guns of Jones' ship had been taken out of action. The captain of Serapis asked Jones if he had struck his colors, to which Jones has been quoted as replying, "I have not yet begun to fight!" Upon raking the Serapis, the crew of the Bonhomme Richard led by Jones boarded the British ship and captured her. Likewise, the French frigate Pallas captured Countess of Scarborough. Two days later, Bonhomme Richard sank from the overwhelming amount of damage that she had sustained. The action was an embarrassing defeat for the Royal Navy.

The French also loaned the Continental Navy the use of the corvette Ariel. The one ship of the line built for service in the Continental Navy was the 74-gun America, but it was offered as a gift to France on September 3, 1782, in compensation for the loss of Le Magnifique in service to the American Revolution.

France officially entered the war on June 17, 1778. Still, the ships that the French sent to the Western Hemisphere spent most of the year in the West Indies and only sailed near the Thirteen Colonies during the Caribbean hurricane season from July until November. The first French fleet attempted landings in New York and Rhode Island, but ultimately failed to engage British forces during 1778. In 1779, a fleet commanded by Vice Admiral Charles Henri, comte d'Estaing assisted American forces attempting to recapture Savannah, Georgia.

In 1780, a fleet with 6,000 troops commanded by Lieutenant General Jean-Baptiste, comte de Rochambeau landed at Newport, Rhode Island; shortly afterward, the British blockaded the fleet. In early 1781, Washington and de Rochambeau planned an attack against the British in the Chesapeake Bay area to coordinate with the arrival of a large fleet under Vice Admiral François, comte de Grasse. Washington and de Rochambeau marched to Virginia after successfully deceiving the British that an attack was planned in New York, and de Grasse began landing forces near Yorktown, Virginia. On September 5, 1781, de Grasse and the British met in the Battle of the Virginia Capes, which ended with the French fleet in control of Chesapeake Bay. Protected from the sea by the French fleet, American and French forces surrounded, besieged, and forced the surrender of the British forces under Lord Cornwallis, effectively winning the war and leading to peace two years later.

== Administration ==
=== Governing bodies ===
The Second Continental Congress created a Naval Committee of three members on Oct. 13, 1775. At the end of the month it was expanded to seven members. By the end of January 1776 three members were not active and the remaining four were appointed members of the Marine Committee created already on Dec. 13, 1775, when Congress decided to build 13 warships. This committee had thirteen members, one from each of the United Colonies, and was authorized to direct the fleet and ships movements by order to naval officers, appoint officers, review the verdicts of naval courts-martial, and build and purchase naval vessels. In September 1776 Congress created the Navy Board of the Middle Department with three members, not members of Congress, and seat in Philadelphia. In April 1777, the Navy Board of the Eastern Department was created for New England with seat in Boston. These boards were subordinate agencies under the Marine Committee and its successors. The Board of Admiralty was created Oct. 28, 1779 and contained two members of Congress and three other commissioners. Its mission was naval planning, the direction of ships and fleets, superintending the marine department, administering the supply of the navy and the settling of accounts. Dec. 8, Congress decided that the Board would take over all matters heretofore taken care of by the Marine Committee. Feb. 7, 1781, Congress decided to create the office of Secretary of Marine replacing the Board of Admiralty. No one was found willing and able to accept that office, so Congress instead created the officer of Agent of Marine Aug. 19, 1781 and on Sept. 7. 1781 made Robert Morris holder of that office while remaining Superintendent of Finance. When Morris resigned as superintendent of finance 1784, Congress did not appoint a successor as Marine Agent and when the USS Alliance was sold in 1785, the naval establishment of the United States ceased to exist without any formal decision.

The original three members of the Naval Committee were Silas Deane, John Langdon and Christopher Gadsden. The additional four were Stephen Hopkins, Joseph Hewes, Richard Henry Lee and John Adams. The thirteen original members of the Marine Committee were Josiah Bartlett, N.H.; John Hancock, Mass.; Stephen Hopkins, R.I.; Silas Deane, Conn.; Francis Lewis, N.Y.; Stephen Crane, N.J.; Robert Morris, Pa.; George Read, Del.; Samuel Chase, Md.; Richard Henry Lee, Va.; Joseph Hewes, N.C.; Christopher Gadsden, S.C. and John Houstoun, Ga. Original members of the Navy Board of the Middle Department were John Nixon (resigned 1778), John Wharton (resigned 1778), and Francis Hopkinson (resigned 1778). New members were William Smith (1778–1778), James Searle (1778–1778), John Wharton (reappointed 1778–1781), James Read (1778 only member late in 1781), William Winder (1778–1781). Members of the Navy Board of the Eastern Department were James Warren (until 1782), William Vernon (until 1781) and John Deshon (until 1781). Commissioners of the Board of Admiralty were Francis Lewis (from 1779) and William Ellery (from 1780), no third commissioner was ever appointed. Congressional members were James Forbes (1779–1780), William Ellery (1779–1780), James Madison (1780–1780), Daniel Huntington (1780–1780), Whitmill Hill (1780–1780), Daniel of St. Thomas Jenifer (only congressional member 1781). Alexander McDougall refused the offer of becoming Secretary of Marine as the Congress did not allow him to retain his rank in the army. Robert Morris was Agent of Marine from 1781 to 1784.

=== Shore establishment ===
When the Marine Committee was created in 1775 it appointed Continental agents in Portsmouth, New Hampshire, Boston, Providence, Rhode Island, New London, Connecticut, New York City, Philadelphia, Baltimore, Williamsburg, Virginia, Edenton, New Bern and Wilmington, North Carolina, and Charleston, South Carolina and Savannah, Georgia. They administered the building of warships in their respective ports and purchased cannons, anchors and sails as well provisions and all other items needed on a ship of war. Doing this they relied on the tradesmen and merchants that had sustained the colonial merchant marines. Established ship chandlers, provision merchants, ship's agents and other members of the business community put their experience to use by the Continental Navy. Most Continental agents were also in charge of the disposing of prizes. When established, the Navy Boards became purveyors and suppliers of ships stationed in Philadelphia and Boston, but the Continental agents continued in these roles in the other ports. The Boards gave orders to the Agents but they often bypassed the Boards and communicated directly with the Marine Committee and later the Board of Admiralty. The American commissioners in Paris filled the function of an overseas Navy Board They directed ships operations, commissioned officers, recruited crews, as well as purchasing, storing and distributing supply for the ships operating in European waters. When Benjamin Franklin became United States Minister to France, these tasks fell on him personally. He employed naval agents in both France and the Netherlands.

After 1780, naval administration deteriorated; Agents were dismissed for not submitting accounts, neglecting their assignments and sometimes for outright corruption. Members of the Board of Admiralty, the Navy Boards and Agents surrendered their commissions disgusted with the existing administrative and financial chaos. The accounting system collapsed in 1781. Lack of funds for new ships and heavy ship's losses reduced the Continental Navy to three ships. When Robert Morris became Agent of Marine in 1781 he closed all navy offices except the Eastern Navy Board as they still had USS Alliance and USS Deane to outfit. He appointed Naval Agents in Massachusetts, New Hampshire, Rhode Island, Connecticut, North Carolina, South Carolina and Georgia with the task of auditing and settling accounts. In June 1783 Joseph Pennell was appointed Commissioner for Settling the Accounts of the Marine Department with branch offices at Boston, New York City and Philadelphia. Morris resigned as Marine Agent in 1784 and the Commissioner was transferred to the Department of the Treasury in 1785.

=== Operating forces ===
When late in 1775, Esek Hopkins was commissioned Commander-in-Chief of the Fleet of the United Colonies he was put in charge of receiving monthly reports of the strength, supply situation and the state of each ship of war, and forwarding them to Congress. It was his duty to issue orders and instructions necessary for the good of the service and to develop a good leadership culture in the Navy. The captain of each ship was responsible for its administration; muster rolls and accounts of provisions and other stores were kept under his responsibility. Change of command required a thorough inventory of ship's stores, provisions and equipage and then the ongoing commander had to sign for it. Pursers were civilian officers in civilian clothes who had learned their job as supercargoes in the colonial merchant marines. There were very few pursers serving in the Continental Navy as it was more profitable for competent persons to take employment with the large number of privateers outfitted during the war. The administrative functions aboard a Continental man of war was instead fulfilled by petty officers: captain's clerks and stewards. Ship's provisions were drawn from Continental Agents or Navy Boards, and transfers took place between ships and even with Continental Army units as necessity required.

== End of the Continental Navy ==
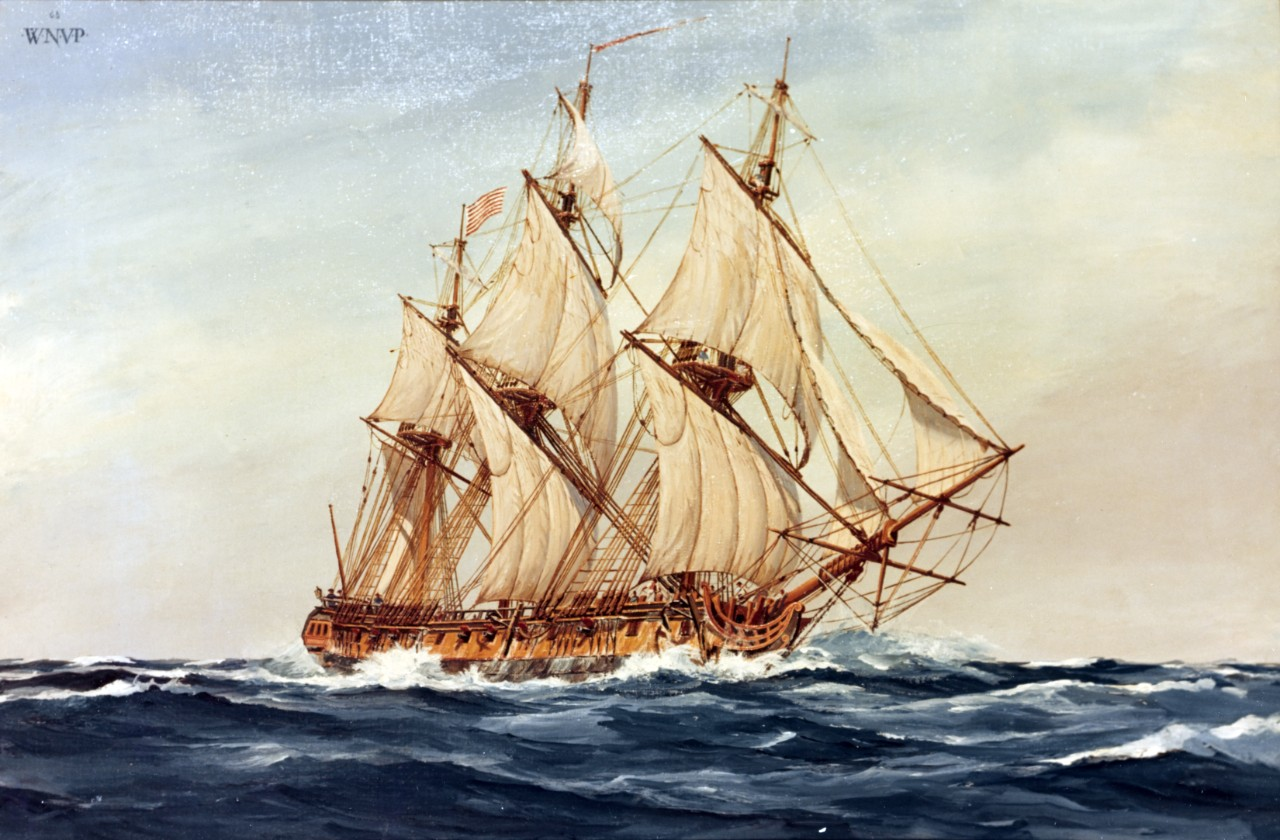
Alliance at sail.

Of the approximately 65 vessels (new, converted, chartered, loaned, and captured) that served at one time or another with the Continental Navy, only 11 survived the war. The Treaty of Paris in 1783 ended the Revolutionary War and, by 1785, Congress had disbanded the Continental Navy and sold the remaining ships.

The frigate Alliance fired the final shots of the American Revolutionary War; it was also the last ship in the Navy. A faction within Congress wanted to keep her, but the new nation did not have the funds to keep her in service, and she was auctioned off for $26,000. Factors leading to the dissolution of the Navy included a general lack of money, the loose confederation of the states, a change of goals from war to peace, and more domestic and fewer foreign interests.

== Continental Navy uniforms ==
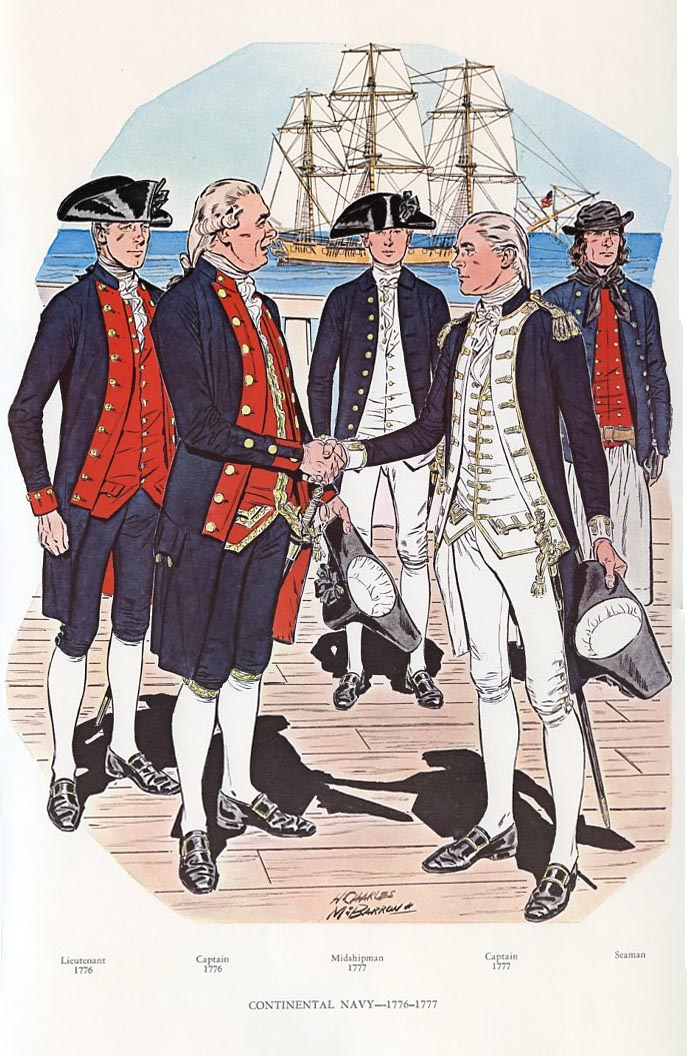
The official Navy officer uniform of 1776 had red lapels and a red waistcoat. The unofficial uniform of 1777, worn by many officers, had white lapels and a white waistcoat, and in addition non-regulation epaulets. From left to right: Lieutenant, Captain (with irregular red buttonhole on the collar), Midshipman, "Commodore" John Paul Jones (with two epaulets).

The Marine Committee issued a uniform instruction on Sept. 5, 1776, with the following specifications:

- Captains, blue cloth, with red lapels, slash cuff, stand-up collar, flat yellow buttons, blue breeches and red waistcoat with narrow lace
- Lieutenants, blue cloth, with red lapels, round cuff faced with red, stand-up collar, flat yellow buttons, blue breeches and red waistcoat, plain.
- Masters, blue cloth with lapels, round cuff, blue breeches and red waistcoat.
- Midshipmen, blue cloth with lapels, round cuff faced with red, stand-up collar red at the button and buttonhole, blue breeches and red waistcoat.

No instructions were issued for the dress of petty officers and seamen. The paucity of fabric at this time made it necessary for the officers to dress in what was available they would not always be dressed according to instructions. Besides, many naval officers did not really like the uniforms prescribed and a group of them met in Boston in 1777 and agreed on a new uniform. The dress selected looked very much like a Royal Navy uniform. The agreement contained the following particulars:

- Captains, blue cloth lined and faced with white and trimmed with gold lace with an epaulet on the right shoulder, blue cloth lined and faced with white and trimmed with gold lace with an epaulet on the right shoulder, white waistcoat and white breeches.
- Lieutenants, blue cloth lined and faced with white, no trim and without epaulet, blue cloth lined and faced with white and trimmed with gold lace with an epaulet on the right shoulder, white waistcoat and white breeches.
- Masters and midshipmen, blue cloth lined with white, no lapels, white waistcoat and white breeches.
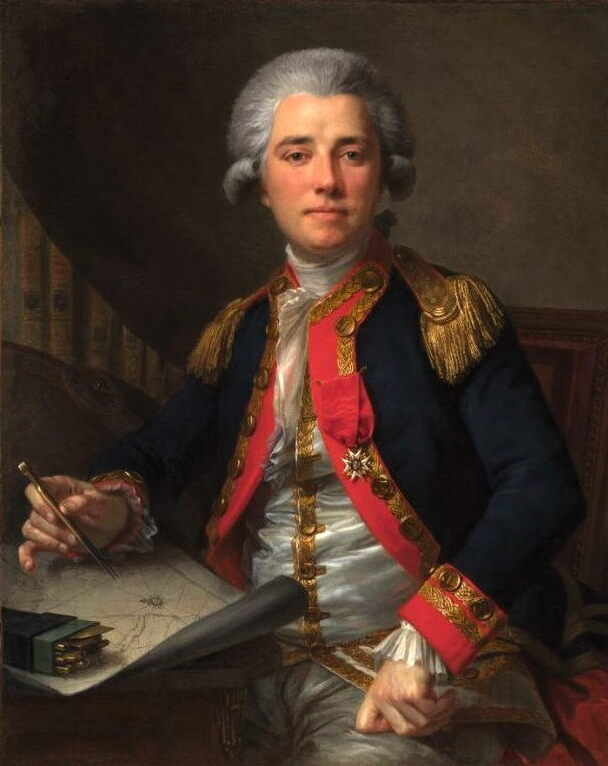
1778 portrait of a French Navy lieutenant in full dress uniform

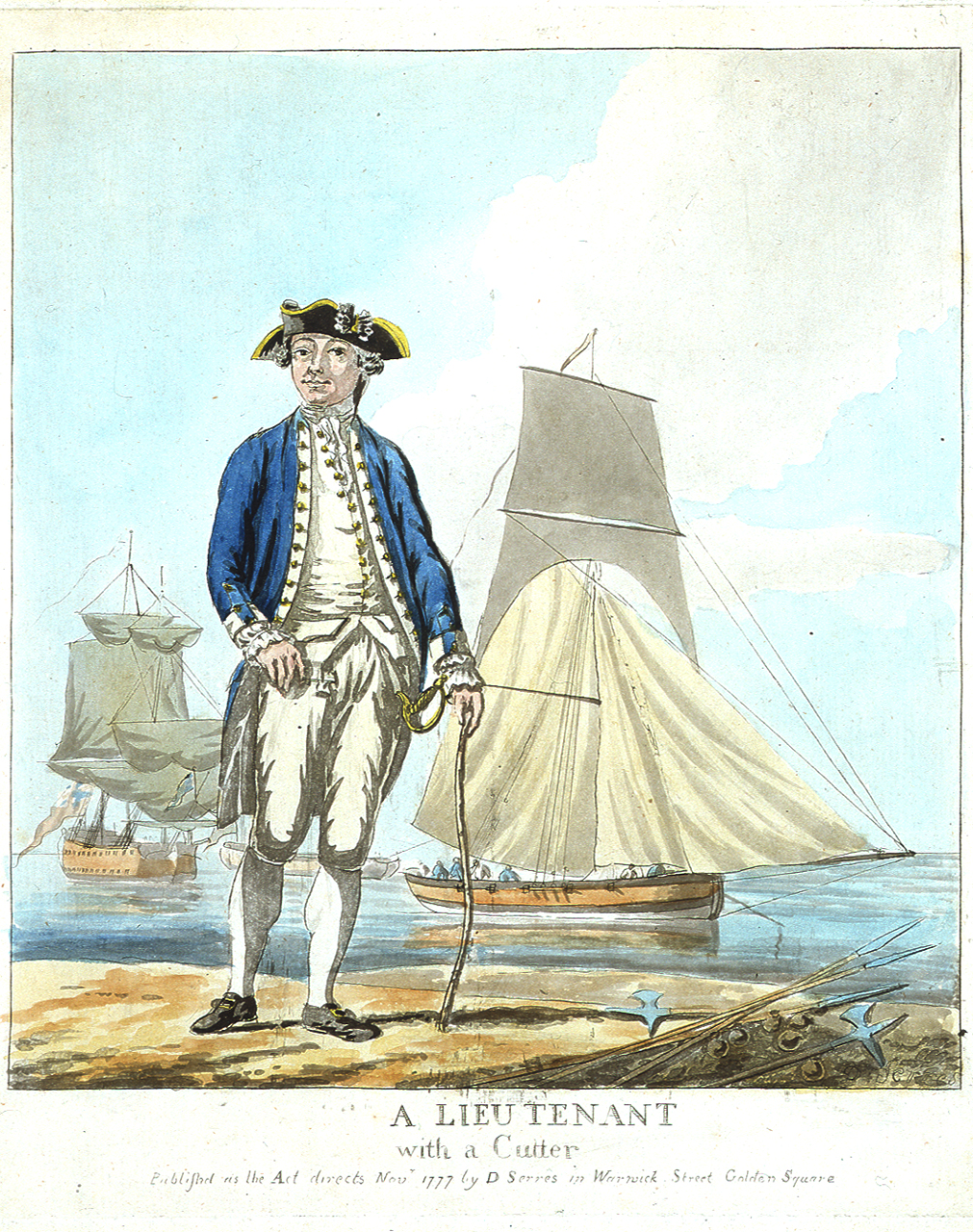
1777 illustration of a Royal Navy lieutenant

== Continental Navy pay ==
Pay table in dollars per calendar month, adopted by the Continental Congress, Nov. 15, 1775.

Rank or rate	Ships of 20 guns and upwards	Ships of 10–20 guns	Vessels under 10 guns commanded by lieutenants	Marines
Captain	60	48	n/a	n/a
Lieutenant, Lieutenant Commanding, Captain of Marines	30	24	30	30
Master	30	24	n/a	n/a
Surgeon	25	21 2/3	n/a	n/a
Chaplain, Lieutenant of Marines	20	n/a	n/a	20
Master's Mate	15	15	15	n/a
Surgeon's Mate	15	13	13	n/a
Boatswain, Gunner, Carpenter	15	13	12	n/a
Captain's Clerk	15	12	12	n/a
Midshipman	12	12	12	n/a
Sailmaker, Steward	10	10	10	n/a
Master-at-arms	10	9	9	n/a
Carpenter's Mate, Yeoman of the Powderroom	9½	9	9	n/a
Cooper, Armorer, Coxswain	9	9	9	n/a
Quartermaster, Cook	9	8½	8½	n/a
Yeoman	8½	8½	8½	n/a
Sailmaker's Mate	8 1/3	8 1/3	8 1/3	n/a
Seaman, Sergeant of Marines	8	8	8	8
Corporal of Marines, Drum and fifes	n/a	n/a	n/a	7 1/3
Private of Marines	n/a	n/a	n/a	6 2/3

At the same time the pay table was adopted, Congress resolved how the rank of the Naval officers be to the rank of officers in the Land Forces: commodore as brigadier general, captain of a ship of 40 guns and upwards as colonel, captain of a ship of 20 to 40 guns as lieutenant colonel, captain of a ship of 10 to 20 guns as major, lieutenant in the Navy as captain.

== See also ==
- Naval battles of the American Revolutionary War
- Quasi War
- United States Navy
- Bibliography of early American naval history
- List of American Revolutionary War battles
- List of George Washington articles

== Bibliography ==
- This article incorporates text from the public domain Dictionary of American Naval Fighting Ships.
- William M. Fowler, Rebels Under Sail (New York: Charles Scribner's Sons, 1976)
- Howarth, Stephen (1999). To Shining Sea: a History of the United States Navy, 1775–1998. Norman, OK: University of Oklahoma Press. ISBN 0-8061-3026-1. OCLC 40200083.
- McBarron, H. Charles (1966). Uniforms of the United States Navy, 1776–1898. Washington, D.C.: U.S. Department of the Navy
- Miller, Nathan (1997). The U.S. Navy: A History (3rd ed.). Annapolis, MD: Naval Institute Press. ISBN 1-55750-595-0. OCLC 37211290.
- Paulin, Charles O. (1906). The Navy of the American Revolution. Chicago.
- Perrenot, Preston B. (2010). United States Navy Grade Insignia 1776–1852. CreateSpace Independent Publishing Platform.
- Schmitt, Frederick P. (1970). "Supplying the Continental Navy." Navy Supply Corps Newsletter 33(2): 22–33.
- Smith, Charles R. (1975). Marines in the Revolution. Washington, D.C., Headquarters, U.S. Marine Corps
- Sondhaus, Lawrence (2001). Naval Warfare 1815–1914. London: Routledge. ISBN 0-415-21478-5. OCLC 44039349.
- Sweetman, Jack (2002). American Naval History: An Illustrated Chronology of the U.S. Navy and Marine Corps, 1775–present. Annapolis, MD: Naval Institute Press. ISBN 1-55750-867-4.
- Wehmann, Howard H. (1989) A guide to pre-federal records in the National Archives. National Archives and Records Administration.

Further reading

- Clark, William Bell, ed. (1964). Naval Documents Of The American Revolution, Volume 1 (Dec. 1774 – Sept. 1775). Washington D.C., U.S. Navy Department.
