= Providence Healthcare =

Providence Healthcare can refer to:

- Providence Healthcare (Toronto)
- Providence Health Care (Vancouver)
- Providence Health & Services, United States
