= USS Providence =

USS Providence may refer to:

- USS Providence (1775), a 12-gun ship originally named Katy, taken into service in 1775 and destroyed in 1779 to forestall capture by the British
- USS Providence (1776 frigate), launched in 1776 and captured by the British in 1780
- USS Providence (1776 gundalow), built in 1776, fought during the Battle of Valcour Island, and was scuttled to prevent capture
- USS Providence (CLG-6), the light cruiser CL-82 from 1945 to 1949, then converted to a guided missile cruiser and in service as such from 1959 to 1973
- USS Providence (SSN-709), the original name of the Los Angeles-class nuclear attack submarine USS Hyman G. Rickover (SSN-709)
- USS Providence (SSN-719), a Los Angeles-class nuclear attack submarine commissioned in 1985.
