= Boardwalk Chapel =

Coordinates: 38.98283°N 74.81628°W

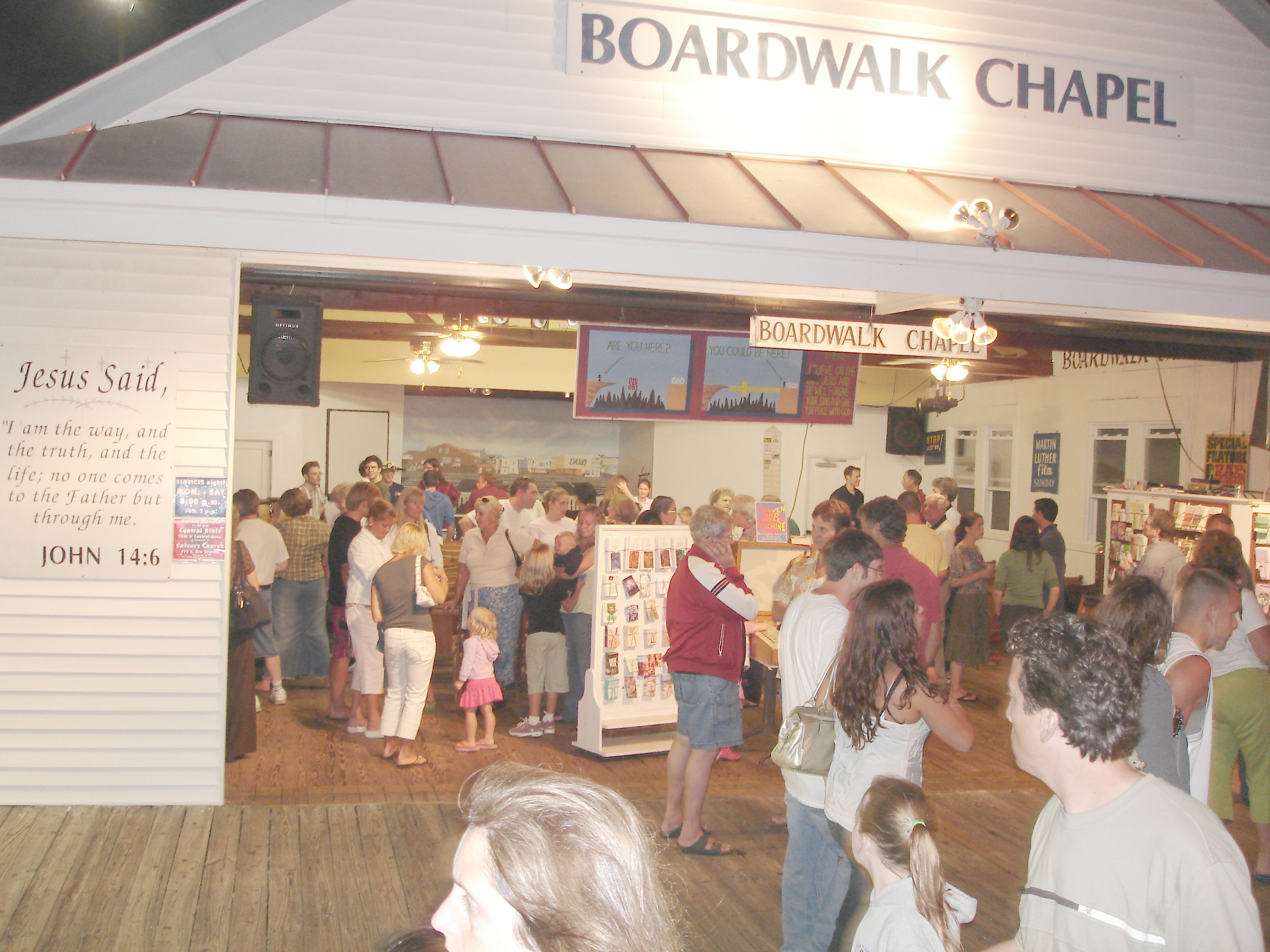

Boardwalk Chapel (formally, "The Boardwalk Chapel") is a summertime Christian Gospel outreach on the two-mile boardwalk on the barrier island of The Wildwoods, New Jersey which holds 77 consecutive evening services during June, July, and August, open to boardwalkers.

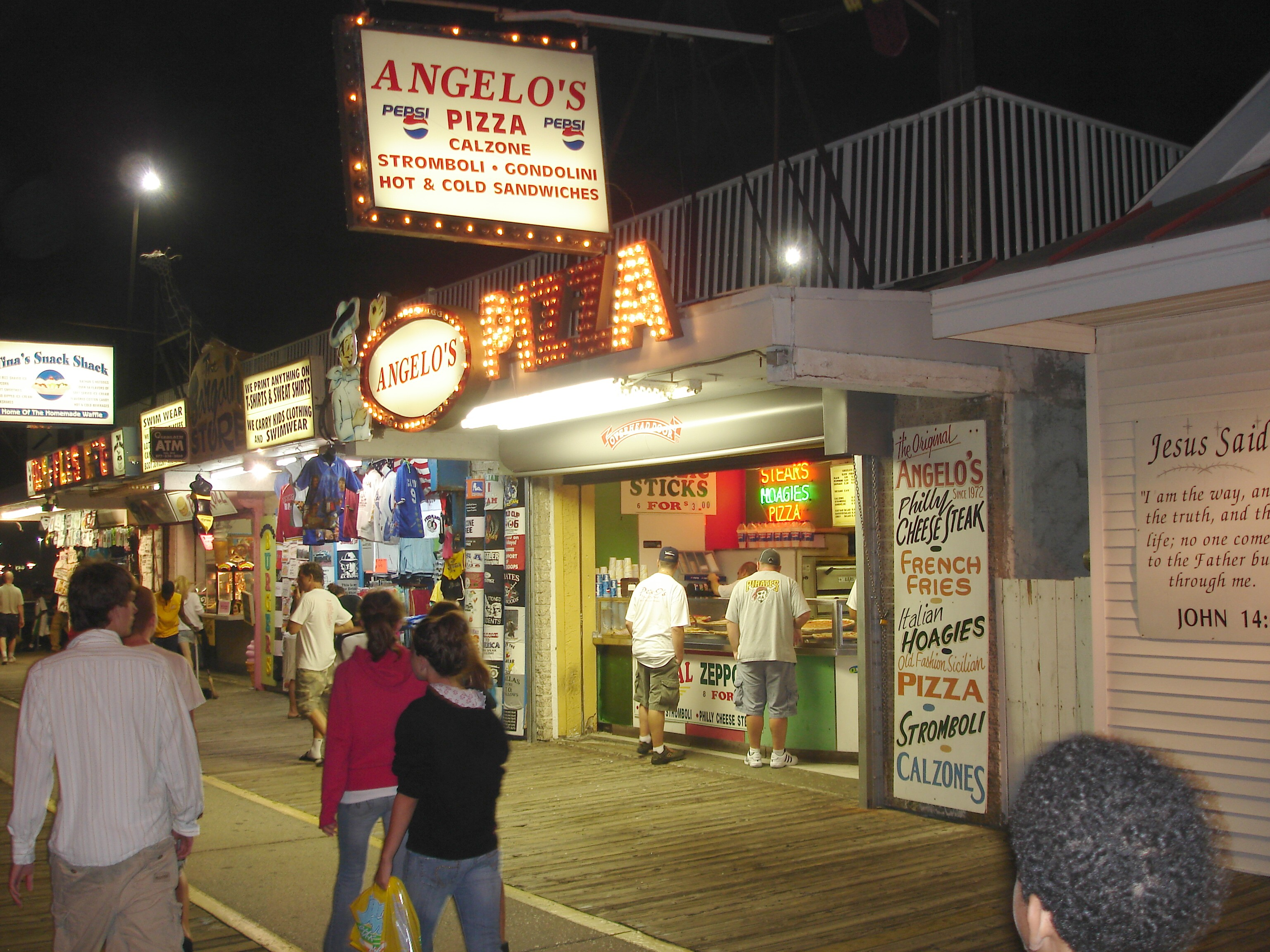

In the early 1940s Rev. Leslie Dunn, pastor of Calvary Orthodox Presbyterian Church, Wildwood, New Jersey, walked up and down the boardwalk of The Wildwoods conducting open-air preaching services. He discovered an empty lot towards the southern end of the boardwalk that was to be sold at a citywide tax auction. He persuaded fellow church members to allow him to bid, but no more than US$3,000; Dunn was the highest bidder at $2,950. The Gospel Pavilion, its original name, had been built during the waning months of World War II. Nightly services began in July 1945, a few weeks before Japan's surrender.

Since its inception the Chapel has been operated by the Presbytery of New Jersey of the Orthodox Presbyterian Church. Its hand-drawn logo depicts the Christian cross rising out of an Atlantic Ocean wave.

Over the years, the chapel has become a landmark for tourists visiting Wildwood. In 2005 a Washington Post travel article said "People come to Wildwood for its beaches ... and for the boardwalk, a roughly three-mile-long human circus of noise, junk food and amusement rides. The boardwalk—part honky-tonk, part family playground—has a few quirks that give it an endearing quality. The ... Boardwalk Chapel, between a tattoo parlor and a pizza parlor, has been the voice in the carny wilderness for 61 years."

== Sources ==
1. A history of the first fifty years of the OPC titled "The Orthodox Presbyterian Church 1936-1986" (ISBN 0-934688-35-4) references the work of the Boardwalk Chapel on pp. 134–135.
2. "Rev. Leslie Dunn Memorial 2001" on the Boardwalk Chapel website.
