= Philadelphia Aces =

Defunct basketball team in Philadelphia, Pennsylvania

- League: United States Basketball League
- Founded: 1985
- Dissolved: 1990
- History: Wildwood Aces (1985–1986); Philadelphia Aces (1987–1988, 1990)
- Arena: Wildwoods Convention Center (1985–1986)
- Location: Wildwood, New Jersey (1985–1986); Philadelphia, Pennsylvania (1987–1988, 1990)
- Division/conference titles: 1988

The Philadelphia Aces were a United States Basketball League team that played from 1987 to 1988 and in 1990.

== History ==
The Philadelphia Aces were previously known as the Wildwood Aces during the 1985 and 1986 seasons. Their home court was the Wildwoods Convention Center in Wildwood, New Jersey. In 1985, the team finished last in the USBL with a 6–18 record while being 12.5 games out of first place. The following year, the squad improved to 21–10, finishing third in the league.

In 1987, the team then moved to Philadelphia, Pennsylvania and became the Philadelphia Aces. That year, they finished tied for fifth in the league with a 13–17 record. In 1988 they went 19–11 and finished in second place, where they participated in the league's postseason festival and made it to the semifinals. In 1990, they played an abridged season and went 1–5.

Notable players from both the Wildwood and Philadelphia tenures include Michael Anderson, Stewart Granger, Othell Wilson, Tim Legler, Ralph Lewis, Alex Bradley, Granger Hall, and Michael Brooks.

== Seasons ==
Stagione	League	Name	W	L	%	Place	Play-off
1985	USBL	Wildwood Aces	6	18	25,0	7º	-
1986	USBL	Wildwood Aces	21	10	67,7	3º	-
1987	USBL	Philadelphia Aces	13	17	43,3	6º	Quarter finals
1988	USBL	Philadelphia Aces	19	11	63,3	2º	Semifinals
1990	USBL	Philadelphia Aces	1	5	16,7	5º	-
