= Wildwood, New Jersey =

City in Cape May County, New Jersey, US

- City
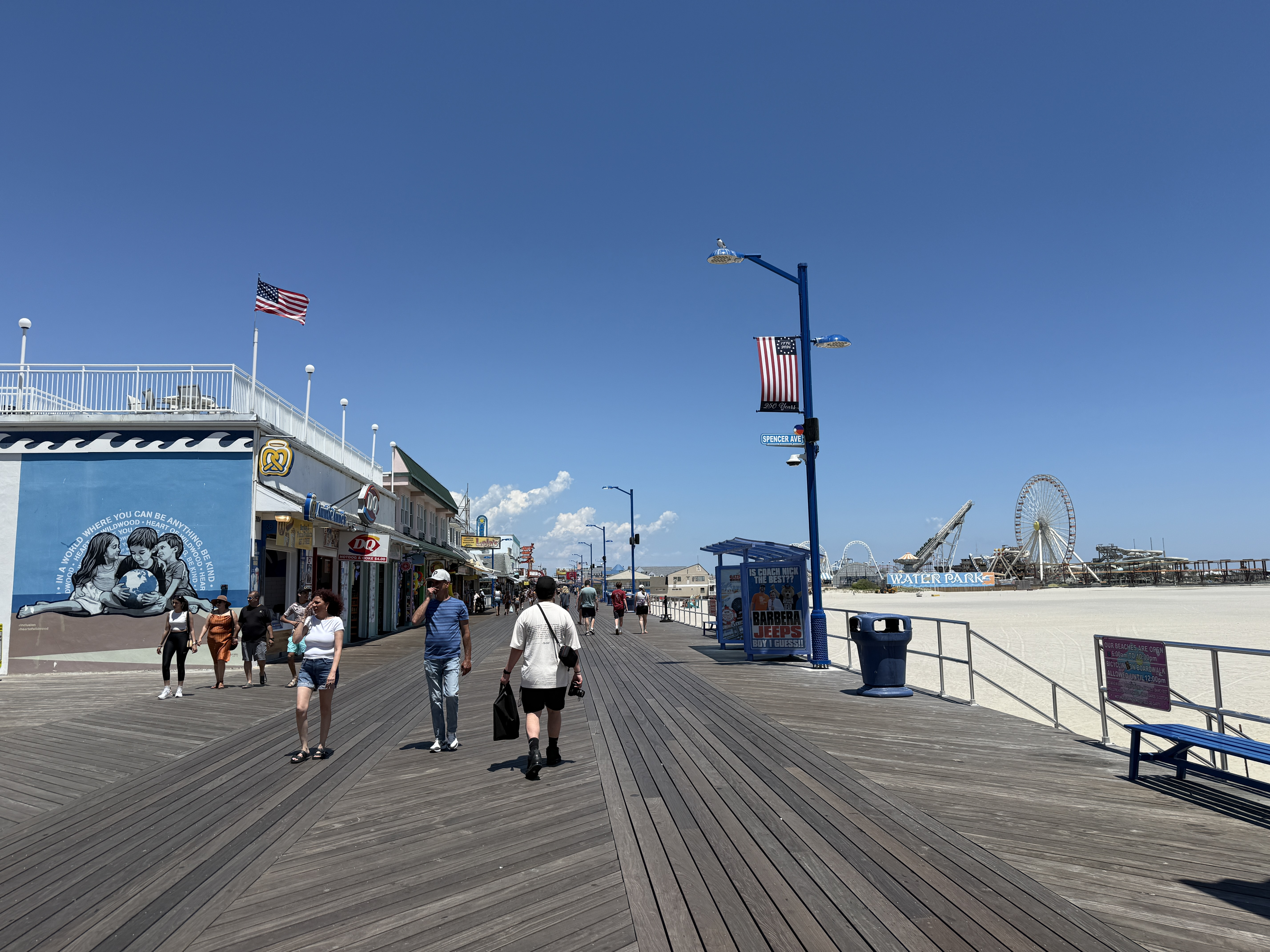
- Boardwalk in Wildwood in June 2026

- logo

- Location of Wildwood in Cape May County highlighted in red (left). Inset map: Location of Cape May County in New Jersey highlighted in orange (right).

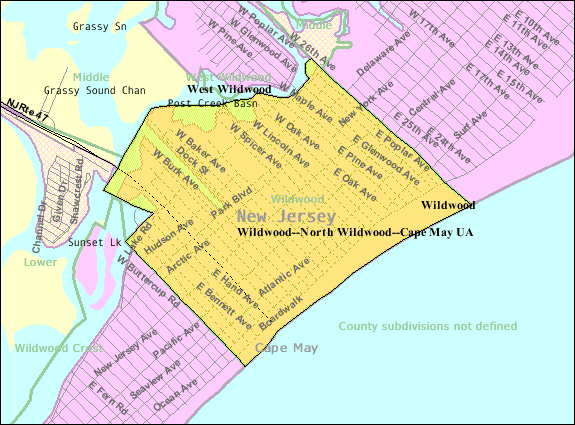
- Census Bureau map of Wildwood, New Jersey

- Location in Cape May County Location in New Jersey Location in the United States
- Coordinates: 38.988914°N 74.819824°W
- Country: United States
- State: New Jersey
- County: Cape May
- Incorporated: May 1, 1895 (as borough); January 1, 1912 (as city)

Government
  - Type: Walsh Act
  - Body: Board of Commissioners
  - Mayor: Ernie Troiano Jr. (term ends December 31, 2027)
  - Municipal clerk: Lisa Brown

Area
  - Total: 1.65 sq mi (4.28 km^{2})
  - Land: 1.54 sq mi (3.99 km^{2})
  - Water: 0.11 sq mi (0.29 km^{2}) 6.79%
  - Rank: 434th of 565 in state 12th of 16 in county
- Elevation: 7 ft (2.1 m)

Population (2020)
  - Total: 5,157
  - Estimate (2023): 5,123
  - Rank: 373rd of 565 in state 6th of 16 in county
  - Density: 3,346.5/sq mi (1,292.1/km^{2})
  - Rank: 203rd of 565 in state 1st of 16 in county
- Time zone: UTC−05:00 (Eastern (EST))
  - Summer (DST): UTC−04:00 (Eastern (EDT))
- ZIP Code: 08260
- Area code: 609 exchanges: 522, 523, 729, 846
- FIPS code: 3481170
- GNIS feature ID: 0885444
- Website: www.wildwoodnj.org

Wildwood is a city in Cape May County in the U.S. state of New Jersey. The city, and all of Cape May County, is part of the Ocean City metropolitan statistical area, and is part of the Philadelphia metropolitan area. As of the 2020 United States census, the city's year-round population was 5,157, a decrease of 168 (−3.2%) from the 2010 census count of 5,325, which in turn reflected a decline of 111 (−2.0%) from the 5,436 counted in the 2000 census. A popular Jersey Shore resort destination, the population can swell to 250,000 during the summer. Wildwood was the first city in New Jersey to have a female mayor, Doris W. Bradway, who was ousted in a 1938 recall election.

The city of Wildwood proper constitutes the center of the island communities collectively known as The Wildwoods, which is used as a collective term to describe four communities on the island with the name Wildwood attached to them: North Wildwood, West Wildwood, Wildwood, and Wildwood Crest. Also part of The Wildwoods are Diamond Beach and a portion of Lower Township on the island. The city, and the surrounding communities that share the name, derives its name from the wild flowers found in the area. Wildwood is part of the South Jersey region of the state.

== History ==
Wildwood was originally incorporated as a borough by an act of the New Jersey Legislature on May 1, 1895, from portions of Middle Township, based on the results of a referendum held the previous day. On January 1, 1912, Wildwood was incorporated as a city, replacing both Wildwood borough and Holly Beach City.

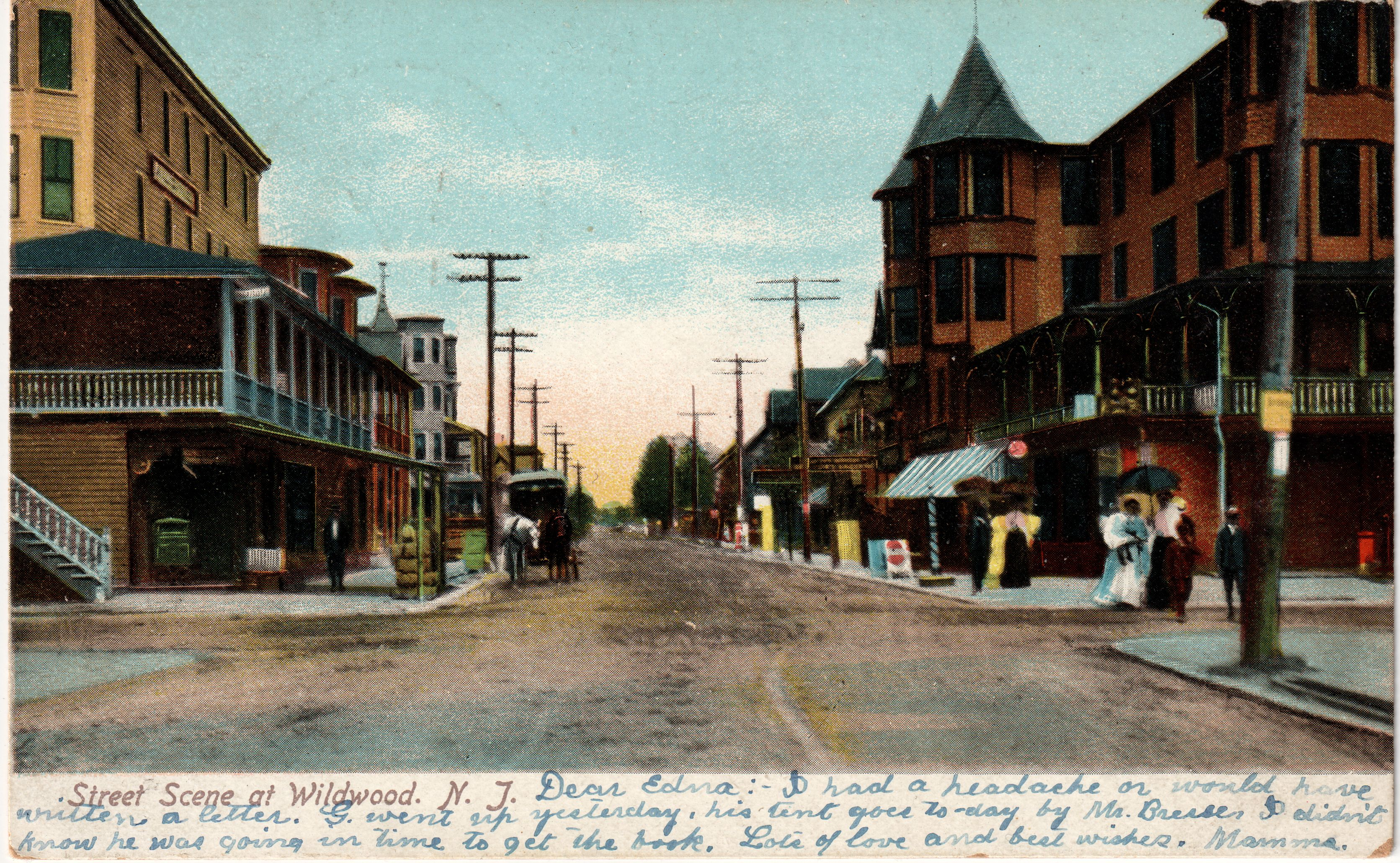
Street scene at Wildwood. New Jersey about 1914

The Wildwoods began developing as a resort in the last decade of the 19th century. A building boom began in the 1950s, due partially to the construction and completion of the Garden State Parkway in 1955.

"Rock Around the Clock", often credited as the first rock and roll record, was first performed on Memorial Day weekend in 1954 at the HofBrau Hotel in Wildwood by Bill Haley & His Comets. The song's status as one of the first rock and roll hits has given rise to the city's claim as "the birthplace of rock and roll". Chubby Checker introduced his version of "The Twist" at the Rainbow Club in Wildwood. On occasion, American Bandstand broadcast from the Wildwood's Starlight Ballroom. Murals in the community honor Checker, Bill Haley; and Bobby Rydell. Rydell's major hit, "Wildwood Days" in 1963, is about Wildwood.

=== Wildwoods Shore Resort Historic District ===
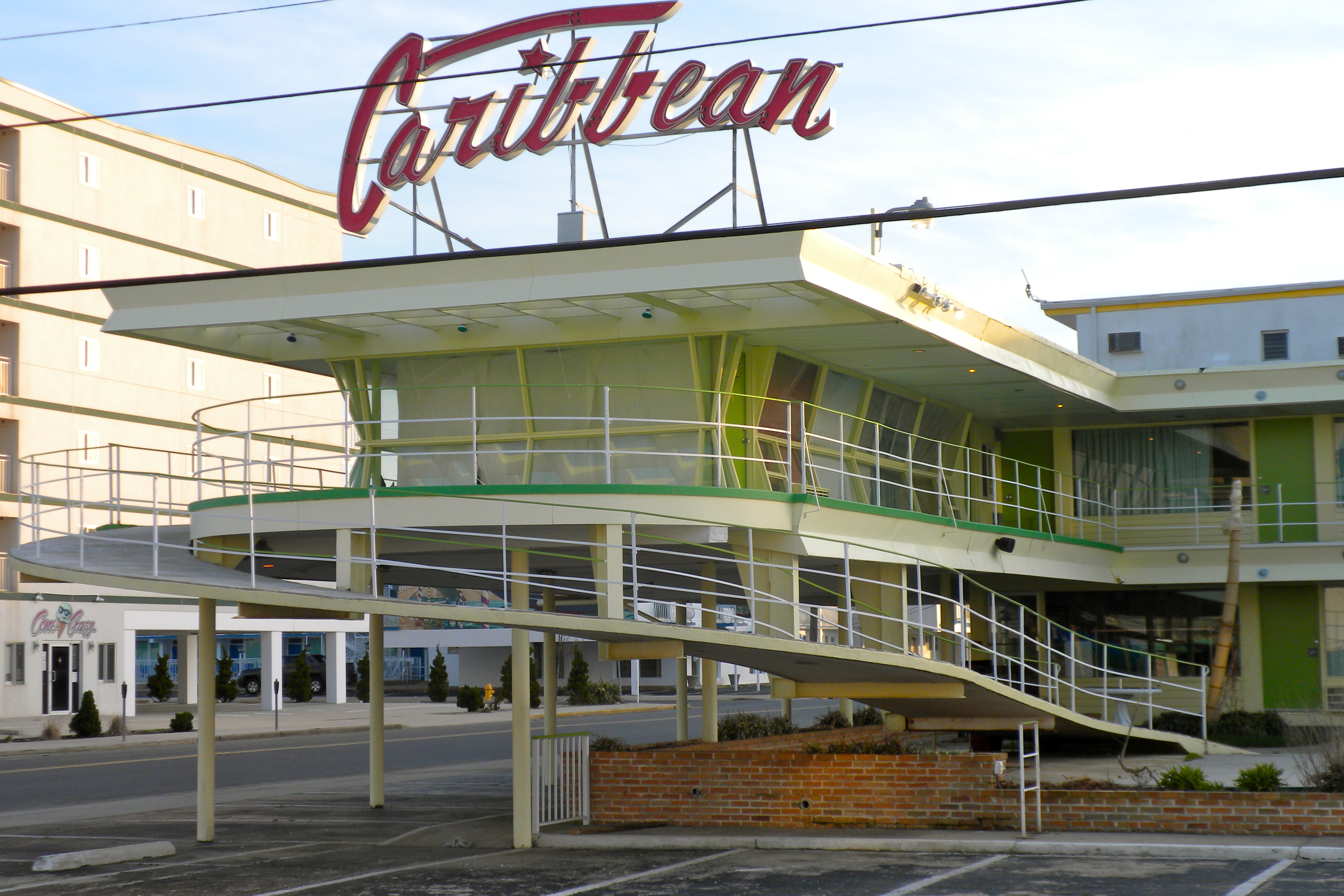
The Caribbean Motel at 5600 Ocean Avenue

Wildwood is home to over 200 motels, built during the Doo-Wop era of the 1950s and 1960s, in an area recognized by the state of New Jersey, known as the Wildwoods Shore Resort Historic District. The term "doo-wop" was coined by Cape May's Mid-Atlantic Center For The Arts in the early 1990s to describe the unique, space-age architectural style, which is also referred to as the Googie or populuxe style.

The motels are unique in appearance, with Vegas-like neon signs and fantastic architecture. New construction in the area has seen the demolition of several motels to make room for larger condominiums. The Wildwood Doo Wop Preservation League has taken action to help save and restore these historic buildings. The Caribbean Motel in Wildwood Crest, and the Chateau Bleu Motel in North Wildwood are both listed on the National Register of Historic Places.

A 1950s Doo Wop museum includes property from demolished motels such as neon signs and furniture. Neo-Doo Wop buildings in the area feature a neon lit Wawa and a 1950s styled Acme Supermarket.

== Geography ==
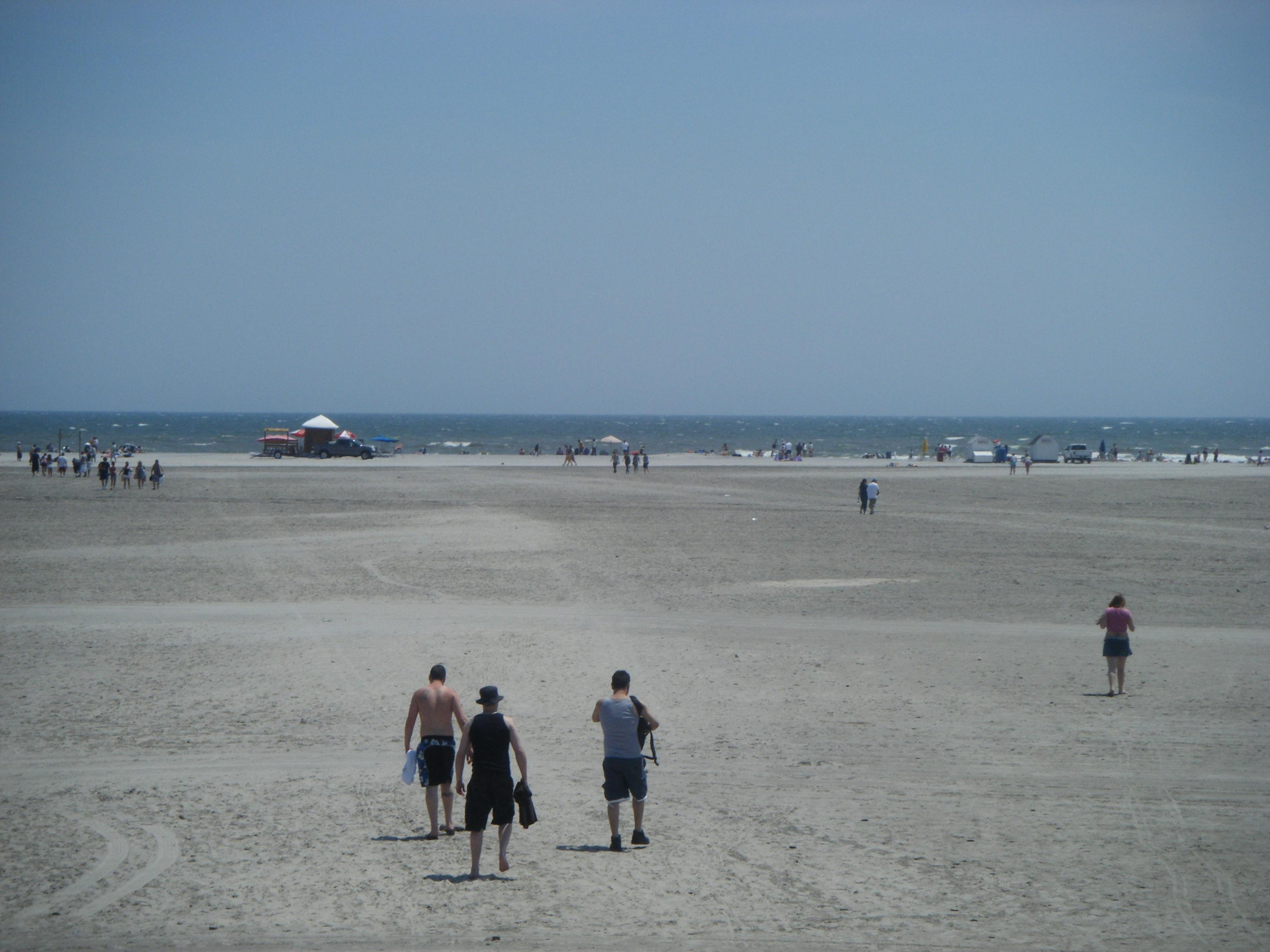
The beach in Wildwood

According to the U.S. Census Bureau, the city had a total area of 1.65 square miles (4.28 km^{2}), including 1.54 square miles (3.99 km^{2}) of land and 0.11 square miles (0.29 km^{2}) of water (6.79%).

The city is located on a barrier island facing the Atlantic Ocean. On the same island is the city of North Wildwood, borough of Wildwood Crest, and the unincorporated community of Diamond Beach, a place in Lower Township. Collectively with the town of West Wildwood (located on a separate, adjacent island), these communities form "The Wildwoods" resort. Wildwood also borders Middle Township.

Unincorporated communities, localities and place names located partially or completely within the city include Five Mile Beach.

== Demographics ==
Historical population
Census	Pop.	Note	%±
1900	150		—
1910	898		498.7%
1920	2,790		210.7%
1930	5,330		91.0%
1940	5,150		−3.4%
1950	5,475		6.3%
1960	4,690		−14.3%
1970	4,110		−12.4%
1980	4,913		19.5%
1990	4,484		−8.7%
2000	5,436		21.2%
2010	5,325		−2.0%
2020	5,157		−3.2%
2023 (est.)	5,123		−0.7%
Population sources: 1900–2000 1900–1920; 1900–1910 1910–1930; 1940–2000 2000; 2010 2020

=== 2020 census ===
As of the 2020 census, Wildwood had a population of 5,157. The median age was 42.2 years. 21.0% of residents were under the age of 18 and 18.0% of residents were 65 years of age or older. For every 100 females there were 101.4 males, and for every 100 females age 18 and older there were 98.9 males.

100.0% of residents lived in urban areas, while 0.0% lived in rural areas.

There were 2,285 households in Wildwood, of which 25.6% had children under the age of 18 living in them. Of all households, 30.1% were married-couple households, 27.9% were households with a male householder and no spouse or partner present, and 33.7% were households with a female householder and no spouse or partner present. About 38.6% of all households were made up of individuals and 15.2% had someone living alone who was 65 years of age or older.

There were 6,780 housing units, of which 66.3% were vacant. The homeowner vacancy rate was 3.0% and the rental vacancy rate was 15.0%.

Racial composition as of the 2020 census
Race	Number	Percent
White	3,165	61.4%
Black or African American	393	7.6%
American Indian and Alaska Native	29	0.6%
Asian	52	1.0%
Native Hawaiian and Other Pacific Islander	0	0.0%
Some other race	922	17.9%
Two or more races	596	11.6%
Hispanic or Latino (of any race)	1,628	31.6%

=== 2010 census ===
The 2010 United States census counted 5,325 people, 2,251 households, and 1,146 families in the city. The population density was 4,082.0 per square mile (1,576.1/km^{2}). There were 6,843 housing units at an average density of 5,245.7 per square mile (2,025.4/km^{2}). The racial makeup was 68.04% (3,623) White, 11.15% (594) Black or African American, 0.73% (39) Native American, 0.79% (42) Asian, 0.13% (7) Pacific Islander, 16.24% (865) from other races, and 2.91% (155) from two or more races. Hispanic or Latino of any race were 31.21% (1,662) of the population.

Of the 2,251 households, 22.5% had children under the age of 18; 29.5% were married couples living together; 15.8% had a female householder with no husband present and 49.1% were non-families. Of all households, 40.7% were made up of individuals and 14.2% had someone living alone who was 65 years of age or older. The average household size was 2.27 and the average family size was 3.03.

20.5% of the population were under the age of 18, 10.4% from 18 to 24, 28.2% from 25 to 44, 27.3% from 45 to 64, and 13.5% who were 65 years of age or older. The median age was 38.0 years. For every 100 females, the population had 105.6 males. For every 100 females ages 18 and older there were 104.8 males.

The Census Bureau's 2006–2010 American Community Survey showed that (in 2010 inflation-adjusted dollars) median household income was $32,783 (with a margin of error of +/− $9,471) and the median family income was $45,125 (+/− $24,251). Males had a median income of $24,416 (+/− $1,945) versus $26,043 (+/− $7,007) for females. The per capita income for the borough was $25,118 (+/− $3,877). About 16.2% of families and 23.0% of the population were below the poverty line, including 25.4% of those under age 18 and 8.7% of those age 65 or over.

=== 2000 census ===
As of the 2000 census, there were 5,436 people, 2,333 households, and 1,273 families residing in the city. The population density was 4,212.6 inhabitants per square mile (1,626.5/km^{2}). There were 6,488 housing units at an average density of 5,027.9 per square mile (1,941.3/km^{2}). The racial makeup of the city was 70.55% White, 16.65% African American, 0.39% Native American, 0.48% Asian, 0.15% Pacific Islander, 8.85% from other races, and 2.94% from two or more races. Hispanic or Latino of any race were 17.62% of the population.

Among Wildwood's Hispanic community in 2000, 69.7% were from Puerto Rico, while an additional 17.0% were from Mexico.

There were 2,333 households, out of which 25.7% had children under the age of 18 living with them, 31.2% were married couples living together, 17.7% had a female householder with no husband present, and 45.4% were non-families. 38.2% of all households were made up of individuals, and 14.5% had someone living alone who was 65 years of age or older. The average household size was 2.30 and the average family size was 3.06.

In the city, the population was spread out, with 25.7% under the age of 18, 10.5% from 18 to 24, 27.7% from 25 to 44, 21.9% from 45 to 64, and 14.2% who were 65 years of age or older. The median age was 36 years. For every 100 females, there were 95.6 males. For every 100 females age 18 and over, there were 91.2 males.

The median income for a household in the city was $23,981, and the median income for a family was $28,288. Males had a median income of $30,787 versus $23,320 for females. The per capita income for the city was $13,682. About 20.2% of families and 26.4% of the population were below the poverty line, including 39.7% of those under age 18 and 21.9% of those age 65 or over.

== Economy ==
=== Commerce ===
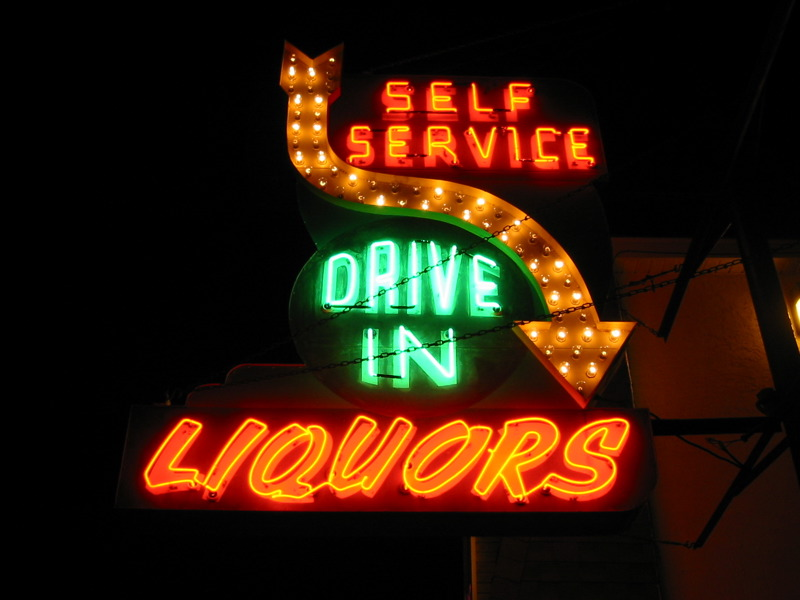
An iconic sign lights up a liquor store in Wildwood, which has more than 60 active liquor licenses

Portions of the city—together with areas in North Wildwood, West Wildwood and Wildwood Crest—are part of a joint Urban Enterprise Zone (UEZ), one of 32 zones covering 37 municipalities statewide. The four municipalities in The Wildwoods were selected in 2002 as one of a group of three zones added to participate in the program as part of a joint zone. In addition to other benefits to encourage employment and investment within the Zone, shoppers can take advantage of a reduced 3.3125% sales tax rate (half of the 6 5/8% rate charged statewide) at eligible merchants. Established in September 2002, the city's Urban Enterprise Zone status expires in December 2023. The joint UEZ is overseen by the Enterprise Zone Development Corporation of the Wildwoods Board, which includes representatives from all four municipalities.

Wildwood has an unusually large number of liquor licenses for its population. State law normally provides for one consumption license (i.e., for a bar, restaurant) for every 3,000 residents, and one distribution license (i.e., for a liquor store) for every 7,500 residents. Because of a state law allowing a municipality to grandfather in liquor licenses that existed before 1948, Wildwood has a permanent population of 5,300, but has 61 active liquor licenses.

=== Tourism ===
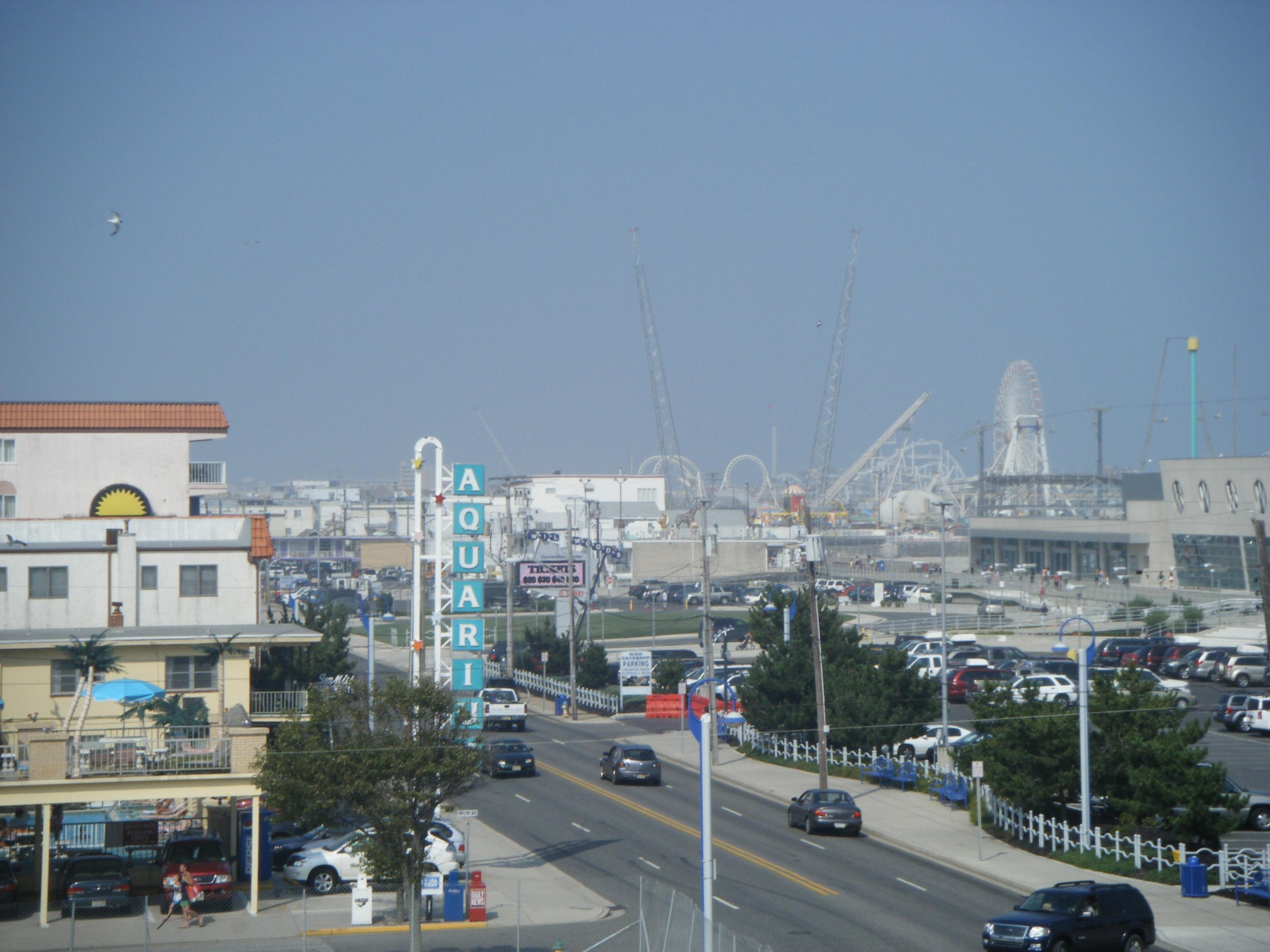
North facing view of Wildwood

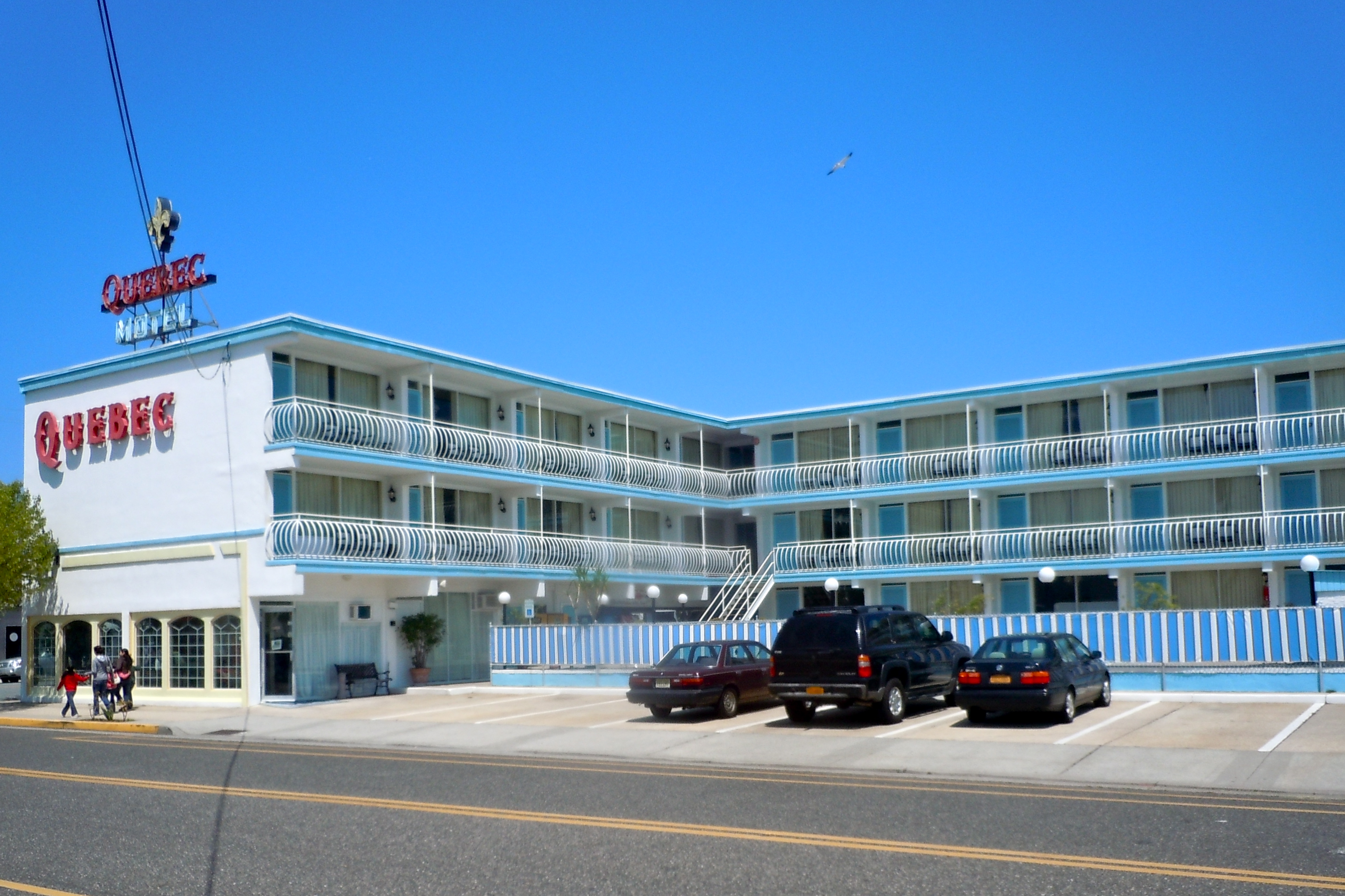
The Quebec Motel, one of several hotels in Wildwood named to attract French Canadian tourists from Quebec

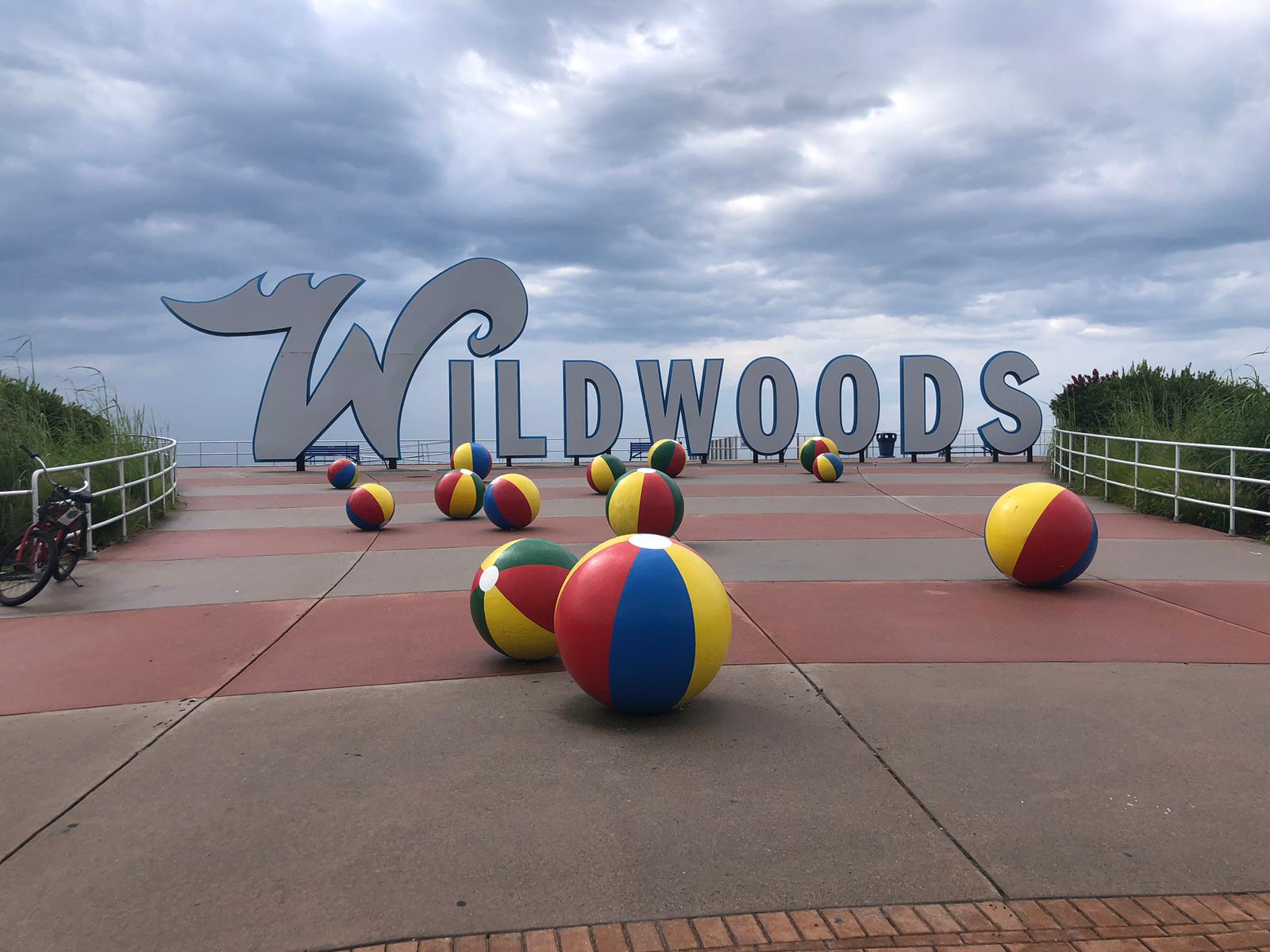
The iconic Wildwoods beach ball signs in 2023

Wildwood is a resort city that is very popular with vacationers and tourists mostly from New Jersey, Delaware, Maryland, Pennsylvania, New York, and even nearby parts of Canada (particularly Ontario and Quebec) during the summer months. The year-round population of Wildwood of over 5,300 grows to as many as 250,000 or more during the peak tourist season during the summer. Its most notable features are its beach and 1.8 miles (2.9 km) boardwalk, home to the Morey's Piers amusement complex and Raging Waters and Ocean Oasis waterparks owned by Morey's Piers. The boardwalk features a trolley called the "Tramcar", which runs from end to end. In June 2006, its Doo-Wop-style motels were placed on the National Trust for Historic Preservation's annual Eleven Most Endangered List, described as "irreplaceable icons of popular culture." In June, thousands of recently graduated high school seniors come to Wildwood for Senior Week. During Senior Week, the graduates stay in hotels and rent beach houses in Wildwood where they party and participate in underage drinking.

Wildwood was ranked the best beach in New Jersey in the 2008 "Top 10 Beaches Contest" sponsored by the New Jersey Marine Sciences Consortium. Wildwood is one of five municipalities in the state that offer free public access to oceanfront beaches monitored by lifeguards, joining Atlantic City, North Wildwood, Wildwood Crest and Upper Township's Strathmere section.

Wildwood is home to the New Jersey Firefighter's Convention, held annually every September since the 1970s. Known for its parade featuring fire company apparatus from across the state, it moved from Atlantic City due in part to rising crime and the disallowing of the parade on city streets. Wildwood is also home to an annual co-ed beach Ultimate Frisbee tournament drawing teams from all over the country that attracted 430 teams and over 5,000 players to its 19th annual event in 2011.

French Canadian tourists from Quebec visit Wildwood during the summer. There are motels in the Wildwoods named to attract tourists from Quebec, including Chateau Bleu, Fleur de Lis, Le Voyageur, Royal Canadian, and Quebec. Several hotels in Wildwood have signs in both English and French. The French Canadian tourists primarily vacation in Wildwood in July when Canada takes a two-week construction holiday.

== Boardwalk ==
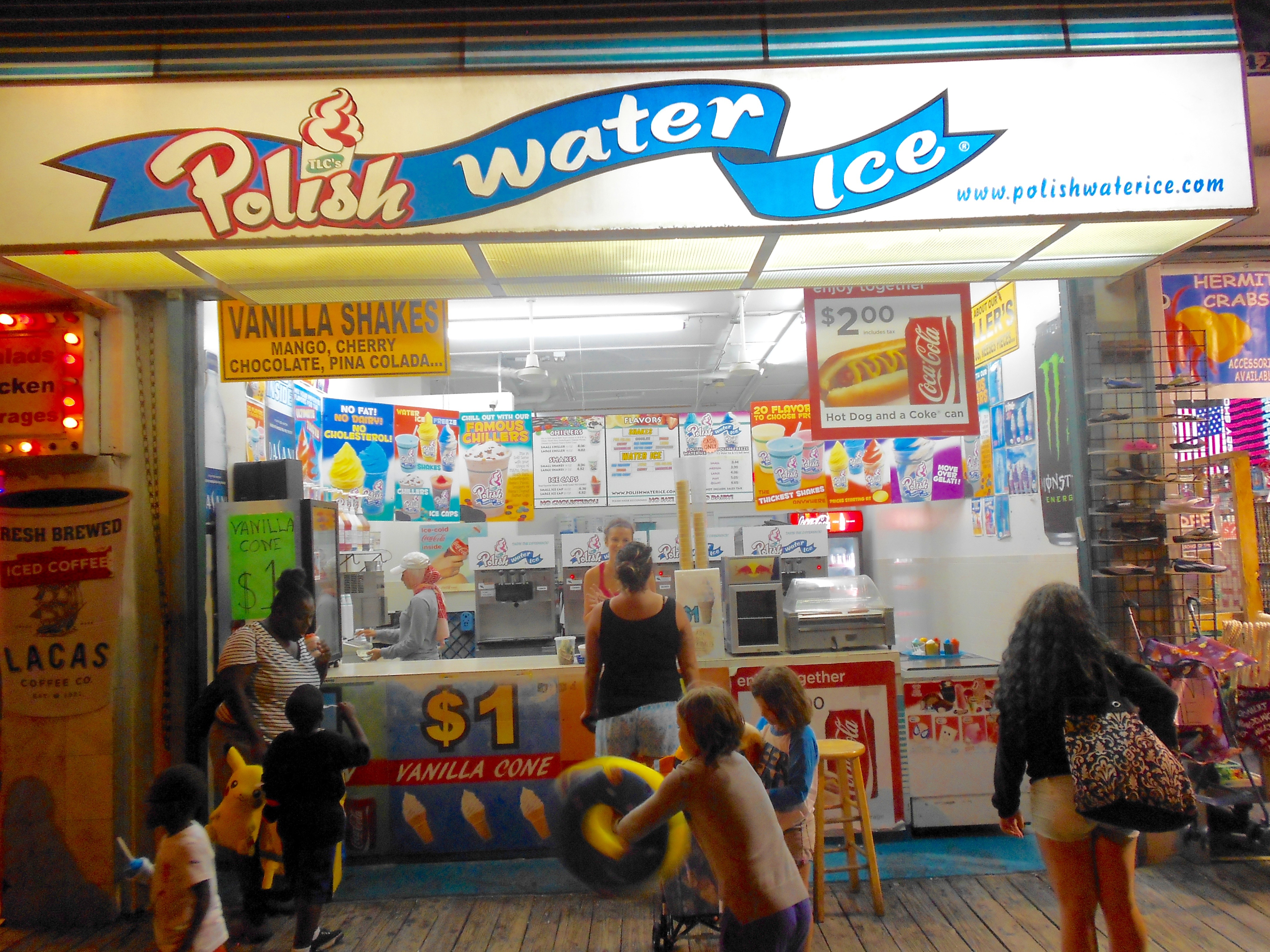
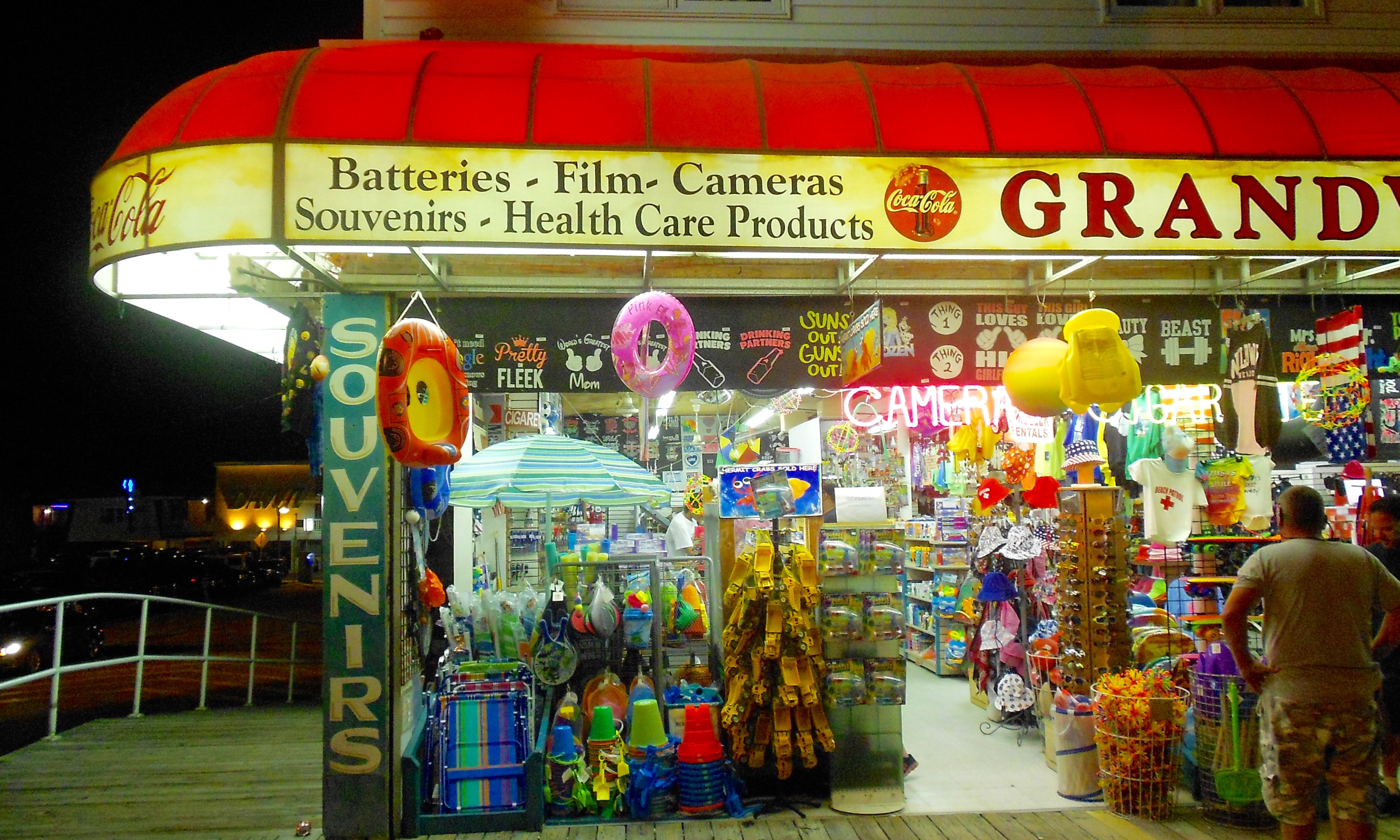
Shops on the boardwalk in Wildwood

The Wildwood Boardwalk features several amusement parks, water parks, an aquarium, and shops, most notably three piers collectively known as Morey's Piers. Due to the distance of the ocean from the boardwalk, the beach is home to many sporting events, concerts, and monster truck rallies in view of the boardwalk. Wildwood is the tenth most popular boardwalk in the United States. A stage is set off to the side of the boardwalk near Mariner's Landing Pier where several performances are held throughout the summer.

In 2008–2009, a section of the boardwalk was rebuilt using ipe tropical hardwood, even though the town had made a commitment to use domestic black locust as a more environmentally friendly option. The black locust wood shipped by the supplier was deemed unacceptable and the commissioners decided to use ipe wood to ensure that the project could be completed in time for the upcoming season.

Boardwalk Chapel is a summertime Christian Gospel outreach on the boardwalk, sandwiched between a pizzeria and a gift shop. Visitors to the boardwalk are invited to attend any of its 77 consecutive evening services held during June, July and August.

== Sports ==
Beach racing, featuring motorcycles and hot rods, takes place every year.

Since 1922, Wildwood has hosted the National Marbles Tournament at Ringer Stadium each June, with winners from local tournaments competing in 1,200 games over the four days of the tournament.

The Wildwood Aces were a professional basketball team that played in the United States Basketball League in 1985 and 1986. Their home court was the Wildwood Convention Hall.

Wildwoods convention hall also hosts a high school wrestling tournament, in which teams and individual wrestlers register to wrestle in a 3-day tournament. The tournament is the "ACWA (Atlantic Coast Wrestling Association) War at the Shore", usually taking place sometime in mid to late April. Also at Wildwood Convention hall is the ACWA National Duals for kids in grades K-6, wrestling as members of either their private club teams or elite teams, with this tournament usually taking place in late January or early February.

== Government ==
=== Local government ===
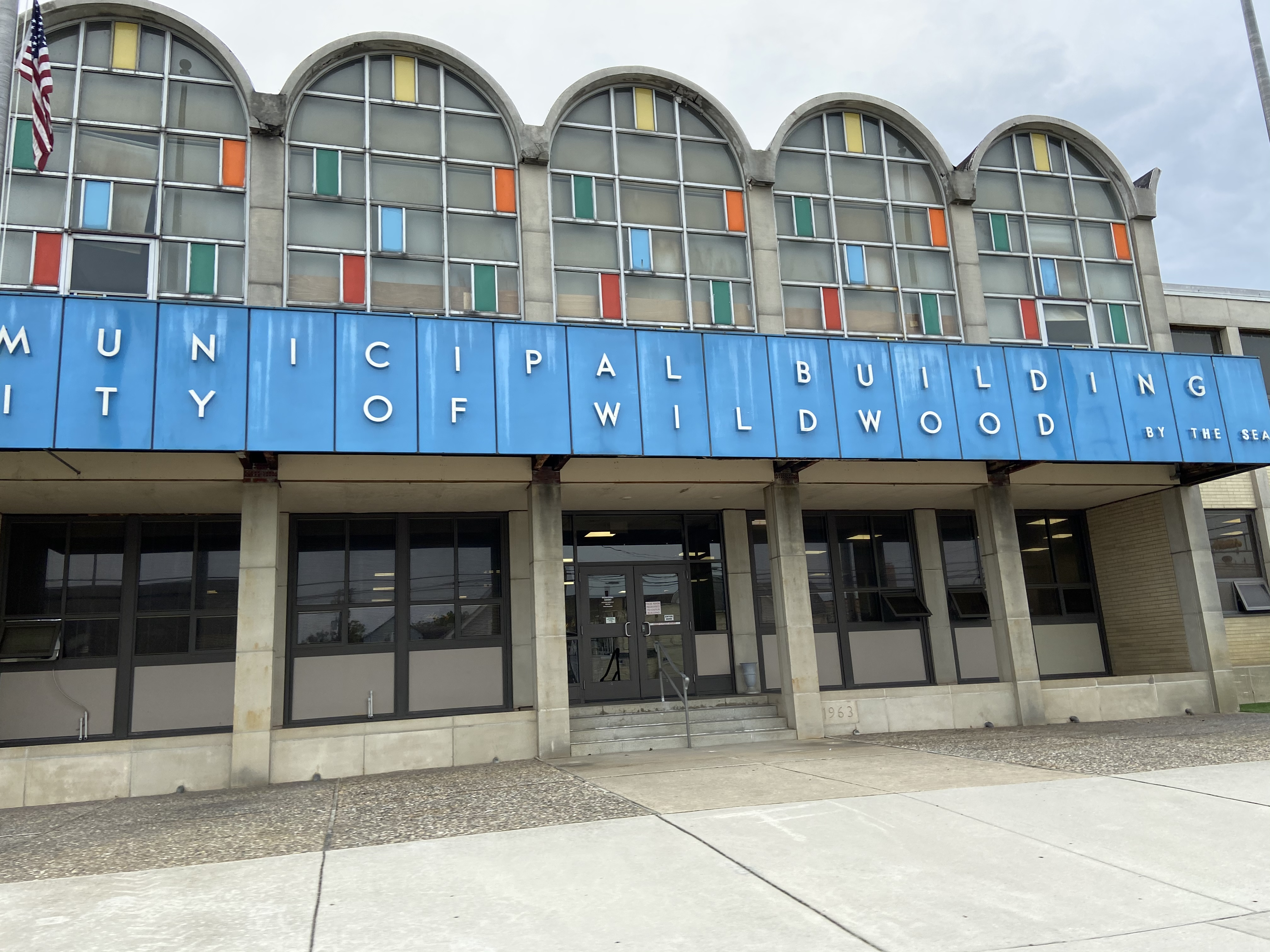
Wildwood Municipal Building

Wildwood is governed by a three-member commission under the Walsh Act Commission form of municipal government. The city is one of 30 municipalities (of the 564) statewide that use this form of government. The governing body is comprised of three commissioners, who are elected at-large on a nonpartisan basis to serve concurrent four-year terms of office, with the vote taking place as part of the November general election. At a reorganization conducted after each election, the commission selects one of its members to serve as mayor and gives each commissioner an assigned department to oversee and manage. As part of the May 2009 election, voters approved a ballot question that shifted elections from May to November. The first election under the new cycle was held in November 2013, with prospective savings of $25,000 each election cited as the primary justification for the change.

As of 2024, members of Wildwood's commission are: Mayor Ernie Troiano Jr. (Commissioner of Public Works, Parks and Public Property), Deputy Mayor Steve Mikulski (Commissioner of Public Affairs and Public Safety) Krista Fitzsimons (Commissioner of Revenue and Finance), all serving concurrent terms of office ending December 31, 2027.

In June 2022, Mayor Peter Byron and Commissioner Steven Mikulski, together with former Mayor Ernest Troiano, were all charged with unlawful taking and tampering with public records in a case in which it was alleged that they improperly declared that they worked full-time for the city so that they could collect health insurance from the city under the State Health Benefit Plan worth hundreds of thousands of dollars.

The Wildwood Housing Authority oversees public housing in the city of Wildwood, providing affordable housing to low and moderate income families, senior citizens, and disabled people. The agency is governed by a seven-member board of commissioners, with six appointed by the Mayor and one appointed by the New Jersey Department of Community Affairs. The housing authority owns two housing developments with a total of 170 units between them. Sandman Tower offers 100 one-bedroom apartments while Commissioners Court offers 70 apartments.

==== History of recall elections ====
Since the City of Wildwood has been incorporated on January 1, 1912, there have been three recall elections all of which were successful. The first was in 1938 when the State's first female Mayor Doris W. Bradway and Commissioner Frederick W. Murray were voted out of office. The second successful recall was in December 1984 when Mayor Earl B. Ostrander was recalled. The third successful recall was in December 2009 when Mayor Ernest Troiano Jr. and Commissioner William N. Davenport were recalled.

=== Federal, state and county representation ===
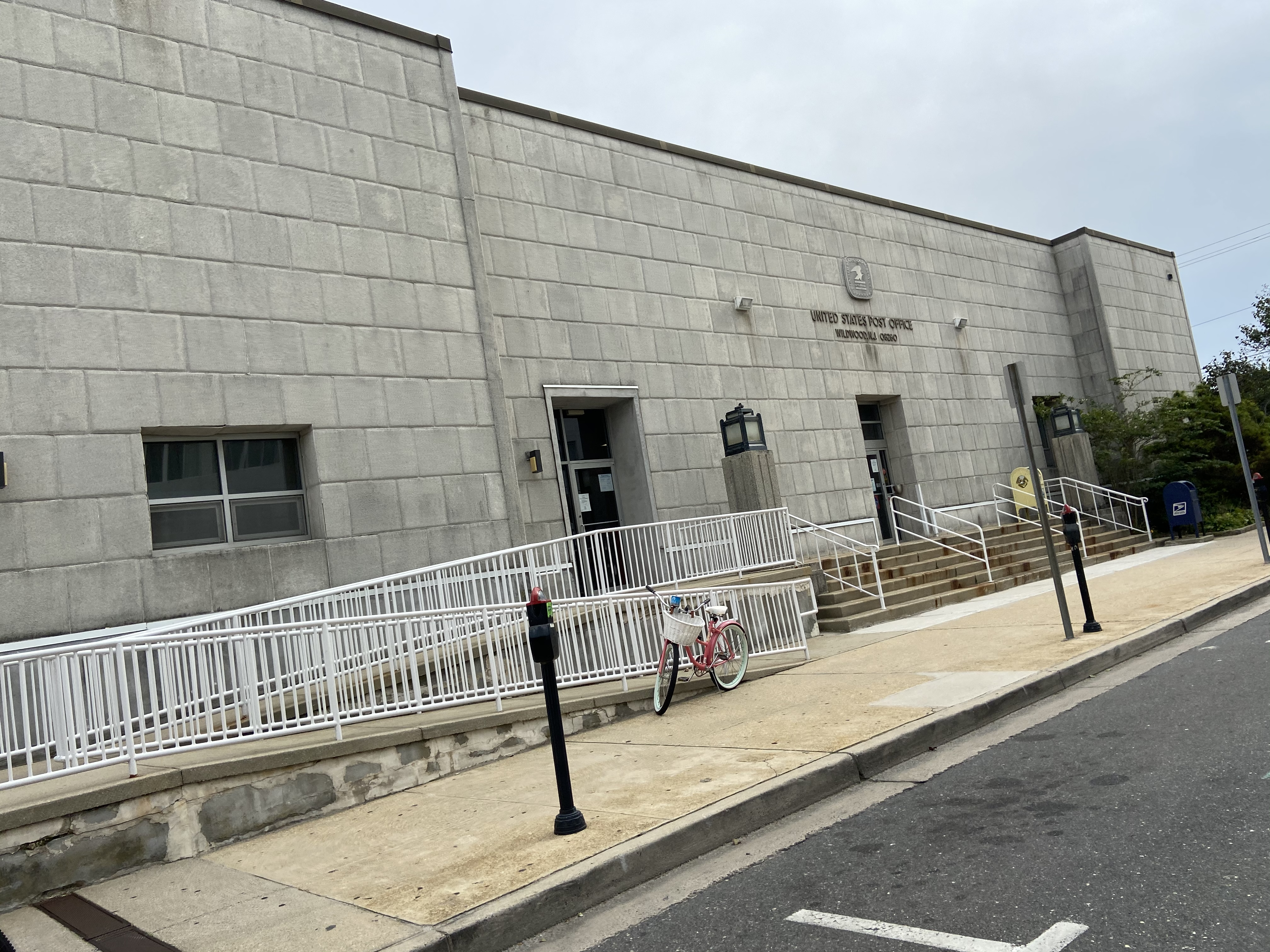
Wildwood Post Office

Wildwood City is located in the 2nd Congressional District and is part of New Jersey's 1st state legislative district.

For the 119th United States Congress, New Jersey's 2nd congressional district is represented by Jeff Van Drew (R, Dennis Township). New Jersey is represented in the United States Senate by Democrats Cory Booker (Newark, term ends 2027) and Andy Kim (Moorestown, term ends 2031).

For the 2026–2027 session, the 1st legislative district of the New Jersey Legislature is represented in the State Senate by Mike Testa (R, Vineland) and in the General Assembly by Antwan McClellan (R, Ocean City) and Erik K. Simonsen (R, Lower Township).

Cape May County is governed by a five-person Board of County Commissioners whose members are elected at-large on a partisan basis to three-year terms of office on a staggered basis, with either one or two seats coming up for election each year; At an annual reorganization held each January, the commissioners select one member to serve as director and another to serve as vice-director. As of 2026, Cape May County's Commissioners are Director Leonard C. Desiderio (R, Sea Isle City, term as commissioner ends December 31, 2027; term as director ends 2026), Vice-Director Andrew Bulakowski (R, Lower Township; term as commissioner ends 2028; term as vice-director ends 2026). Robert Barr (R, Ocean City; 2028) and Will Morey (R, Wildwood Crest; 2026), with one seat expiring in December 2026 vacant after Melanie Collette resigned from office in March 2026. The county's constitutional officers are Clerk Rita Marie Rothberg (R, Ocean City; 2030), Sheriff Robert Nolan (R, Lower Township; 2026) and Surrogate E. Marie Hayes (R, Ocean City; 2028).

=== Politics ===
As of March 2011, there were a total of 2,791 registered voters in Wildwood City, of which 611 (21.9%) were registered as Democrats, 732 (26.2%) were registered as Republicans and 1,448 (51.9%) were registered as Unaffiliated. There were no voters registered to other parties.

Gubernatorial election results for Wildwood
Year	Republican		Democratic		Third party(ies)	
Year	No.	%	No.	%	No.	%
2025	761	55.67%	595	43.53%	11	0.80%
2021	644	59.63%	427	39.54%	9	0.83%
2017	387	46.07%	437	52.02%	16	1.90%
2013	622	66.10%	307	32.62%	12	1.28%
2009	540	51.63%	444	42.45%	62	5.93%
2005	364	36.77%	600	60.61%	26	2.63%

In the 2012 presidential election, Democrat Barack Obama received 61.3% of the vote (991 cast), ahead of Republican Mitt Romney with 38.2% (617 votes), and other candidates with 0.6% (9 votes), among the 1,635 ballots cast by the city's 2,979 registered voters (18 ballots were spoiled), for a turnout of 54.9%. In the 2008 presidential election, Democrat Barack Obama received 54.4% of the vote (964 cast), ahead of Republican John McCain, who received 44.2% (783 votes), with 1,772 ballots cast among the city's 2,583 registered voters, for a turnout of 68.6%. In the 2004 presidential election, Democrat John Kerry received 52.6% of the vote (949 ballots cast), outpolling Republican George W. Bush, who received around 45.8% (825 votes), with 1,803 ballots cast among the city's 3,161 registered voters, for a turnout percentage of 57.0.

Presidential elections results
Year	Republican	Democratic
2024	58.7% 1,100	39.8% 746
2020	53.4% 1,110	45.3% 941
2016	51.1% 843	46.4% 765
2012	38.2% 617	61.3% 991
2008	44.2% 783	54.4% 964
2004	45.8% 825	52.6% 949

In the 2013 gubernatorial election, Republican Chris Christie received 66.1% of the vote (622 cast), ahead of Democrat Barbara Buono with 32.6% (307 votes), and other candidates with 1.3% (12 votes), among the 976 ballots cast by the city's 2,828 registered voters (35 ballots were spoiled), for a turnout of 34.5%. In the 2009 gubernatorial election, Republican Chris Christie received 50.8% of the vote (540 ballots cast), ahead of both Democrat Jon Corzine with 41.7% (444 votes) and Independent Chris Daggett with 4.5% (48 votes), with 1,064 ballots cast among the city's 2,908 registered voters, yielding a 36.6% turnout.

United States Senate election results for Wildwood1
Year	Republican		Democratic		Third party(ies)	
Year	No.	%	No.	%	No.	%
2024	996	59.04%	669	39.66%	22	1.30%
2018	637	54.77%	485	41.70%	41	3.53%
2012	494	35.01%	882	62.51%	35	2.48%
2006	457	46.44%	504	51.22%	23	2.34%

United States Senate election results for Wildwood2
Year	Republican		Democratic		Third party(ies)	
Year	No.	%	No.	%	No.	%
2020	959	50.58%	880	46.41%	57	3.01%
2014	348	50.29%	335	48.41%	9	1.30%
2013	236	51.42%	219	47.71%	4	0.87%
2008	611	41.71%	812	55.43%	42	2.87%

== Education ==
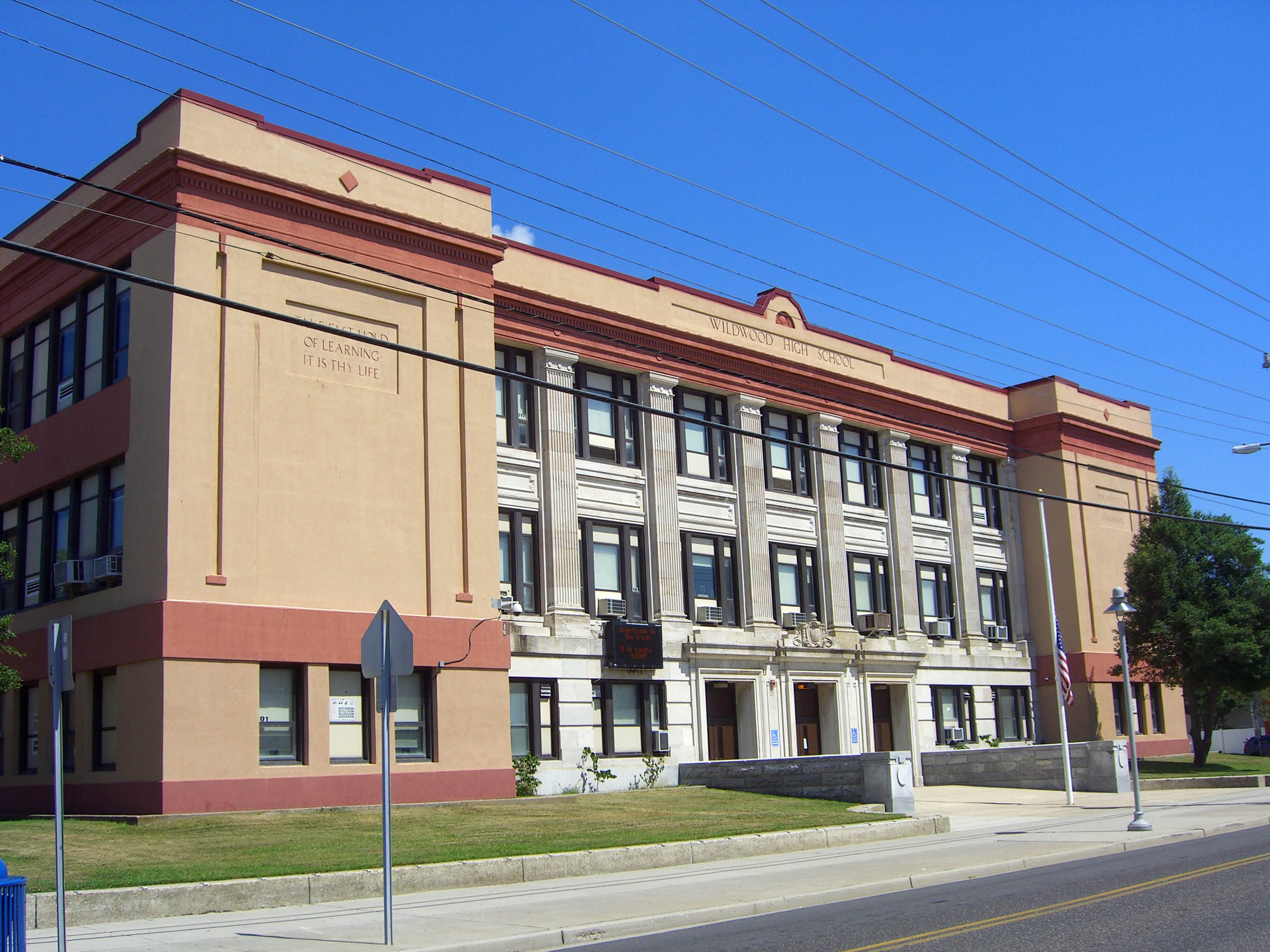
Wildwood High School

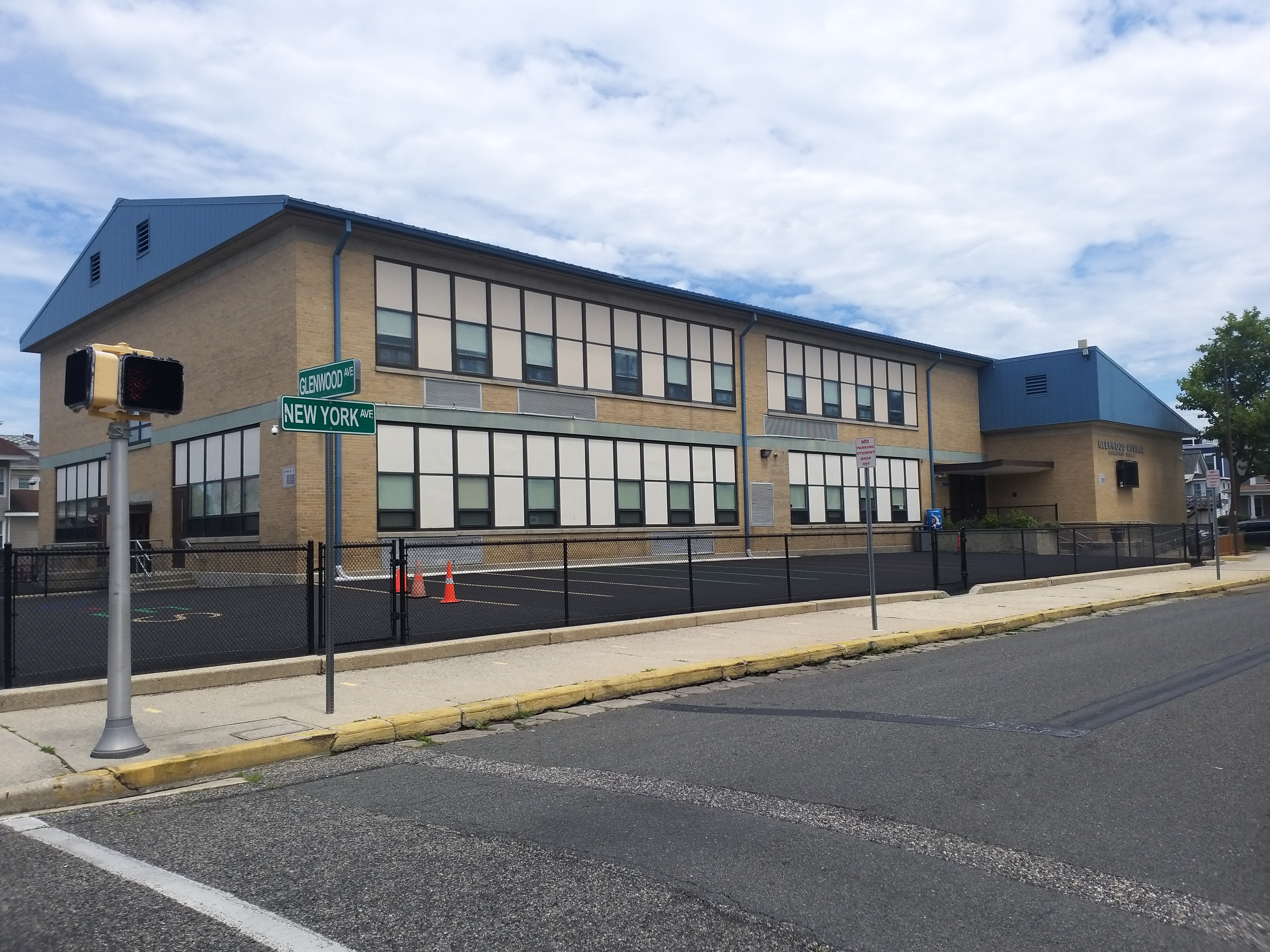
Glenwood Avenue Elementary School

The Wildwood Public School District serves students in pre-kindergarten through twelfth grade. As of the 2019–20 school year, the district, comprised of three schools, had an enrollment of 938 students and 92.3 classroom teachers (on an FTE basis), for a student–teacher ratio of 10.2:1. Schools in the district (with 2019–20 enrollment data from the National Center for Education Statistics) are Glenwood Elementary School with 470 students in grades Pre-K–5, Wildwood Middle School with 186 students in grades 6–8, and Wildwood High School with 245 students in grades 9–12. For ninth through twelfth grades, students from North Wildwood and Wildwood Crest attend Wildwood High School as part of sending/receiving relationships. Public school students from West Wildwood, a non-operating school district, attend the district's schools for grades 9–12 as part of a sending/receiving relationship.

Students are also eligible to attend Cape May County Technical High School in the Cape May Court House area, which serves students from the entire county in its comprehensive and vocational programs, which are offered without charge to students who are county residents. Special needs students may be referred to Cape May County Special Services School District in the Cape May Court House area.

There is one Catholic school on the island, Wildwood Catholic Academy (PreK–12) in North Wildwood, which operates under the auspices of the Roman Catholic Diocese of Camden. There was previously a Catholic elementary school in Wildwood, St. Ann's School, which operated until 2010, when it merged into Cape Trinity Regional School (PreK–8) in North Wildwood. Upon its creation Cape Trinity Catholic Regional School operated separately from Wildwood Catholic High School but shared a common building. In April 2020, the Diocese of Camden announced that both of its Wildwood schools would permanently close at the end of the 2020–21 school year. However, both schools avoided closure after agreeing to merge to create Wildwood Catholic Academy. Additionally As of 2020 Bishop McHugh Regional School in Dennis Township takes students from Wildwood.

== Transportation ==
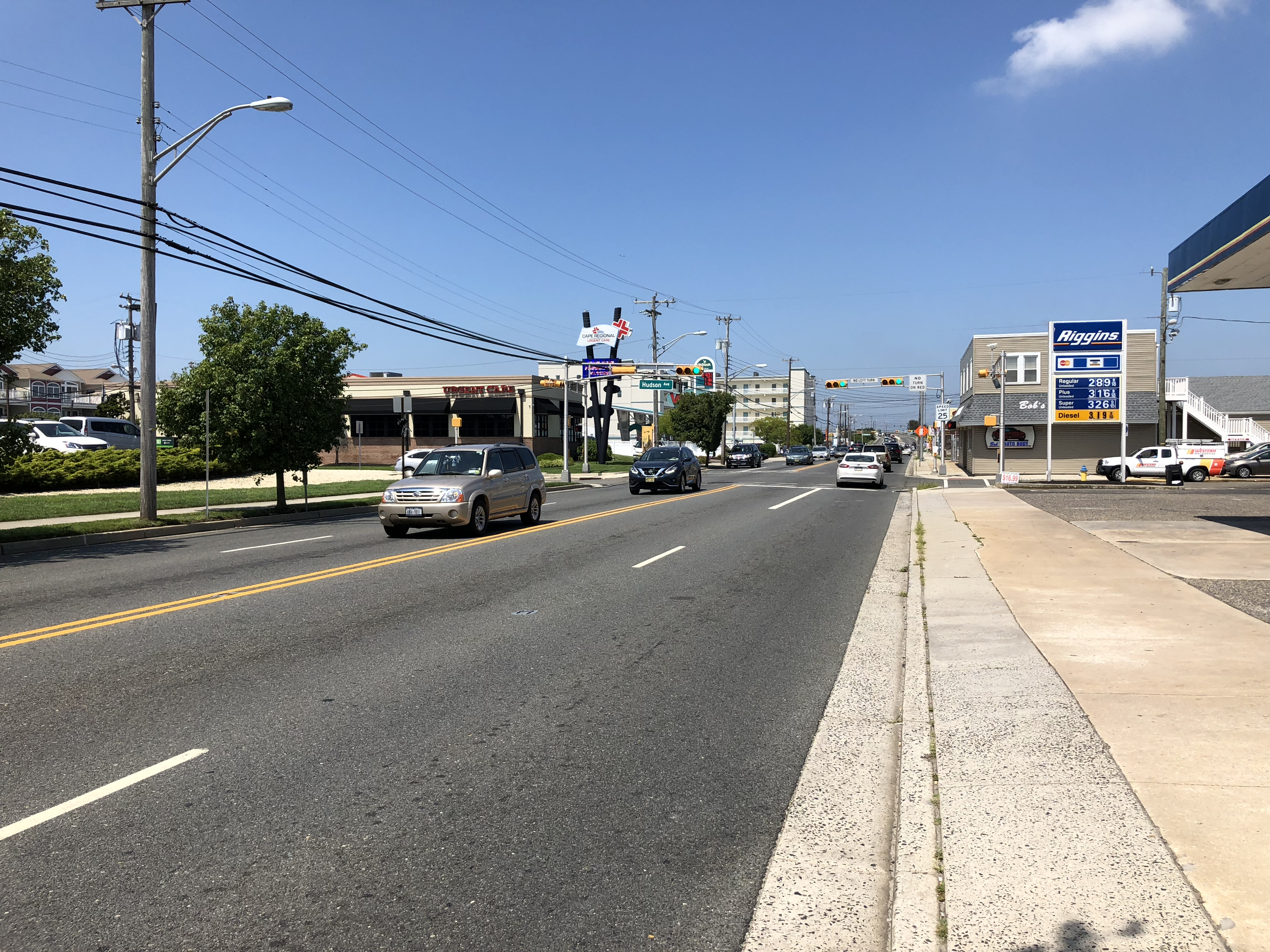
Route 47 north in Wildwood

=== Roads and highways ===
The city had a total of 32.38 miles (52.11 km) of roadways, of which 29.93 miles (48.17 km) were maintained by the municipality, 2.37 miles (3.81 km) by Cape May County and 0.08 miles (0.13 km) by the New Jersey Department of Transportation.

Route 47 (Rio Grande Avenue) has its southern terminus in Wildwood and continues into Lower Township via the George Reading Wildwood Bridge, which provides access to the Garden State Parkway. County Route 621 (New Jersey Avenue) runs for 1.3 miles (2.1 km) through the city, from Wildwood Crest to the south to North Wildwood in the north, and serves as part of Ocean Drive.

Parking in the beach and downtown areas of Wildwood is regulated by on-street parking meters and paid parking lots. Parking meters in Wildwood are in effect from May 15 to October 31. Wildwood has 24 paid parking lots in the beach area that are privately owned and charge varying rates based on demand. Among these lots is a 719-space lot operated by the Wildwoods Convention Center. There is also a public parking lot along Schellenger Avenue in the downtown area. In 2018, Wildwood began offering paid parking on the beach for vehicles with four-wheel drive at Baker Avenue, with space for 1,000 vehicles.

=== Public transportation ===
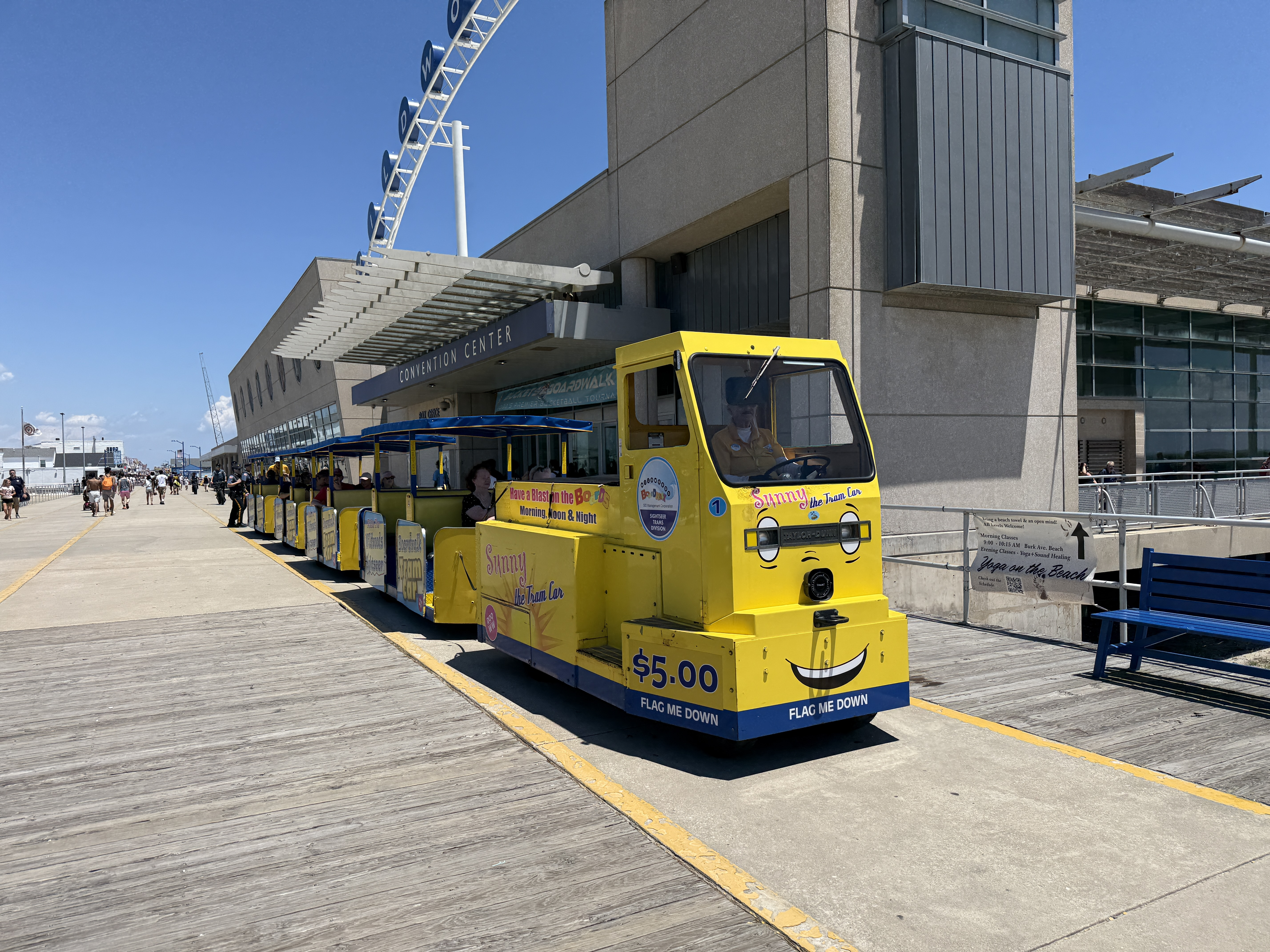
Tramcar on Wildwood boardwalk

NJ Transit provides bus service to Philadelphia on the 313 and 315 routes and to Atlantic City on the 552 route, with seasonal service to Philadelphia on the 316 route, to the Port Authority Bus Terminal in Midtown Manhattan on the 319 route, and to Rio Grande on the 510 route. NJ Transit buses stop at the Wildwood Bus Terminal, which is located on Washington Avenue between Burk Avenue and Davis Avenue.

The Great American Trolley Company operated trolley service in Wildwood during the summer months. There were two trolley routes that provided service to the boardwalk at Schellenger Avenue in Wildwood during the evening hours, with one route serving Wildwood and Wildwood Crest daily and the other route serving North Wildwood on Fridays and Saturdays. Another trolley route ran from North Wildwood and Wildwood to shopping centers in Rio Grande, operating Mondays through Fridays. The Great American Trolley Company also ran trolley service to the Irish Fall Festival in North Wildwood, with a route connecting Wildwood Crest and Wildwood to the festival site during the weekend of the festival.

The Tramcar is a trackless train service running along the entire length of the Wildwoods boardwalk from Cresse Avenue in Wildwood to 16th Avenue in North Wildwood during the summer season.

== Media outlets ==
=== Television and radio stations ===
- WMGM-TV virtual channel 40 (UHF channel 36) is a Justice Network affiliated TV station and is the first and only TV station licensed to Wildwood. Their offices and studios are located in Linwood in neighboring Atlantic County.
- WCMC (AM) is a radio station licensed to Wildwood and broadcasts on 1230 AM with an Oldies format which it simulcasts from sister station WMID.
- WZXL is a radio station licensed to Wildwood and broadcasts on 100.7 FM with a Classic rock format.
- Residents of Wildwood are served by Comcast Cable's Xfinity service.

=== Newspapers ===
The City of Wildwood is served by local and distance newspapers with local editions. They are:

- The Press of Atlantic City a major daily newspaper in South New Jersey which includes a Cape May County edition.
- Cape May County Herald a weekly newspaper with news and information for residents of Cape May County.
- The Star-Ledger a major daily newspaper based in Newark which prints a local edition for Cape May County.
- Philadelphia Daily News a major daily newspaper based in Philadelphia with local editions for Cape May County.
- The Philadelphia Inquirer a major daily newspaper based in Philadelphia with local editions for Cape May County.

== Climate ==
According to the Köppen climate classification system, Wildwood has a humid subtropical climate (Cfa) with hot, moderately humid summers, cool winters and year-around precipitation. Cfa climates are characterized by all months having an average mean temperature above 32.0 °F (0.0 °C), at least four months with an average mean temperature at or above 50.0 °F (10.0 °C), at least one month with an average mean temperature at or above 71.6 °F (22.0 °C) and no significant precipitation difference between seasons. During the summer months in Wildwood, a cooling afternoon sea breeze is present on most days, but episodes of extreme heat and humidity can occur with heat index values at or above 95.0 °F (35.0 °C). The Atlantic hurricane season lasts from June 1 to November 30, which can bring storms, most typically between August and late October. In 2012, Hurricane Sandy destroyed much of the Wildwood Boardwalk, which has since been restored. During the winter months, episodes of extreme cold and wind can occur with wind chill values below 0.0 °F (−17.8 °C). The plant hardiness zone at Wildwood Beach is 7b with an average annual extreme minimum air temperature of 6.7 °F (−14.1 °C). The average seasonal (November–April) snowfall total is 12 to 18 inches (30 to 46 cm), and the average snowiest month is February which corresponds with the annual peak in nor'easter activity.

Climate data for Wildwood Beach, NJ (1981–2010 Averages)
Month	Jan	Feb	Mar	Apr	May	Jun	Jul	Aug	Sep	Oct	Nov	Dec	Year
Mean daily maximum °F (°C)	42.0 (5.6)	43.7 (6.5)	50.4 (10.2)	59.6 (15.3)	68.8 (20.4)	78.0 (25.6)	83.0 (28.3)	81.7 (27.6)	76.3 (24.6)	66.2 (19.0)	56.4 (13.6)	46.8 (8.2)	62.8 (17.1)
Daily mean °F (°C)	34.9 (1.6)	36.6 (2.6)	43.0 (6.1)	52.2 (11.2)	61.3 (16.3)	70.8 (21.6)	76.0 (24.4)	74.8 (23.8)	68.8 (20.4)	58.2 (14.6)	48.7 (9.3)	39.6 (4.2)	55.5 (13.1)
Mean daily minimum °F (°C)	27.7 (−2.4)	29.5 (−1.4)	35.6 (2.0)	44.7 (7.1)	53.9 (12.2)	63.7 (17.6)	69.0 (20.6)	67.9 (19.9)	61.3 (16.3)	50.2 (10.1)	41.1 (5.1)	32.3 (0.2)	48.2 (9.0)
Average precipitation inches (mm)	3.36 (85)	2.83 (72)	4.17 (106)	3.63 (92)	3.59 (91)	3.20 (81)	3.80 (97)	4.13 (105)	3.32 (84)	3.60 (91)	3.26 (83)	3.63 (92)	42.52 (1,080)
Average relative humidity (%)	66.3	65.7	64.1	62.3	66.9	71.2	70.5	73.1	69.7	68.8	67.7	66.9	67.8
Average dew point °F (°C)	24.8 (−4.0)	26.2 (−3.2)	31.7 (−0.2)	39.7 (4.3)	50.2 (10.1)	61.0 (16.1)	65.7 (18.7)	65.6 (18.7)	58.5 (14.7)	48.0 (8.9)	38.5 (3.6)	29.5 (−1.4)	45.0 (7.2)
Source: PRISM

Climate data for North Cape May, NJ Ocean Water Temperature (8 W Wildwood)
Month	Jan	Feb	Mar	Apr	May	Jun	Jul	Aug	Sep	Oct	Nov	Dec	Year
Daily mean °F (°C)	37 (3)	37 (3)	42 (6)	50 (10)	59 (15)	68 (20)	76 (24)	77 (25)	73 (23)	72 (22)	52 (11)	42 (6)	56 (13)
Source: NOAA

== Ecology ==
According to the A. W. Kuchler U.S. potential natural vegetation types, Wildwood would have a dominant vegetation type of Northern Cordgrass (73) with a dominant vegetation form of Coastal Prairie (20).

== Religion ==
Notre Dame de la Mer Catholic Parish, of the Roman Catholic Diocese of Camden has its primary worship site in Wildwood. Previously it was a standalone church, St. Ann's Church. In 2008 the diocese announced that it would merge into Assumption Church of Wildwood Crest, and the merger occurred in 2010.

== Culture and recreation ==
Every June, the Barefoot Country Music Festival is held on Wildwood Beach, drawing tens of thousands of attendees. Acts like Blake Shelton, Kid Rock, Darius Rucker, Cole Swindell , Eric Church, Jason Aldean and Florida Georgia Line have played the festival.

== In popular culture ==
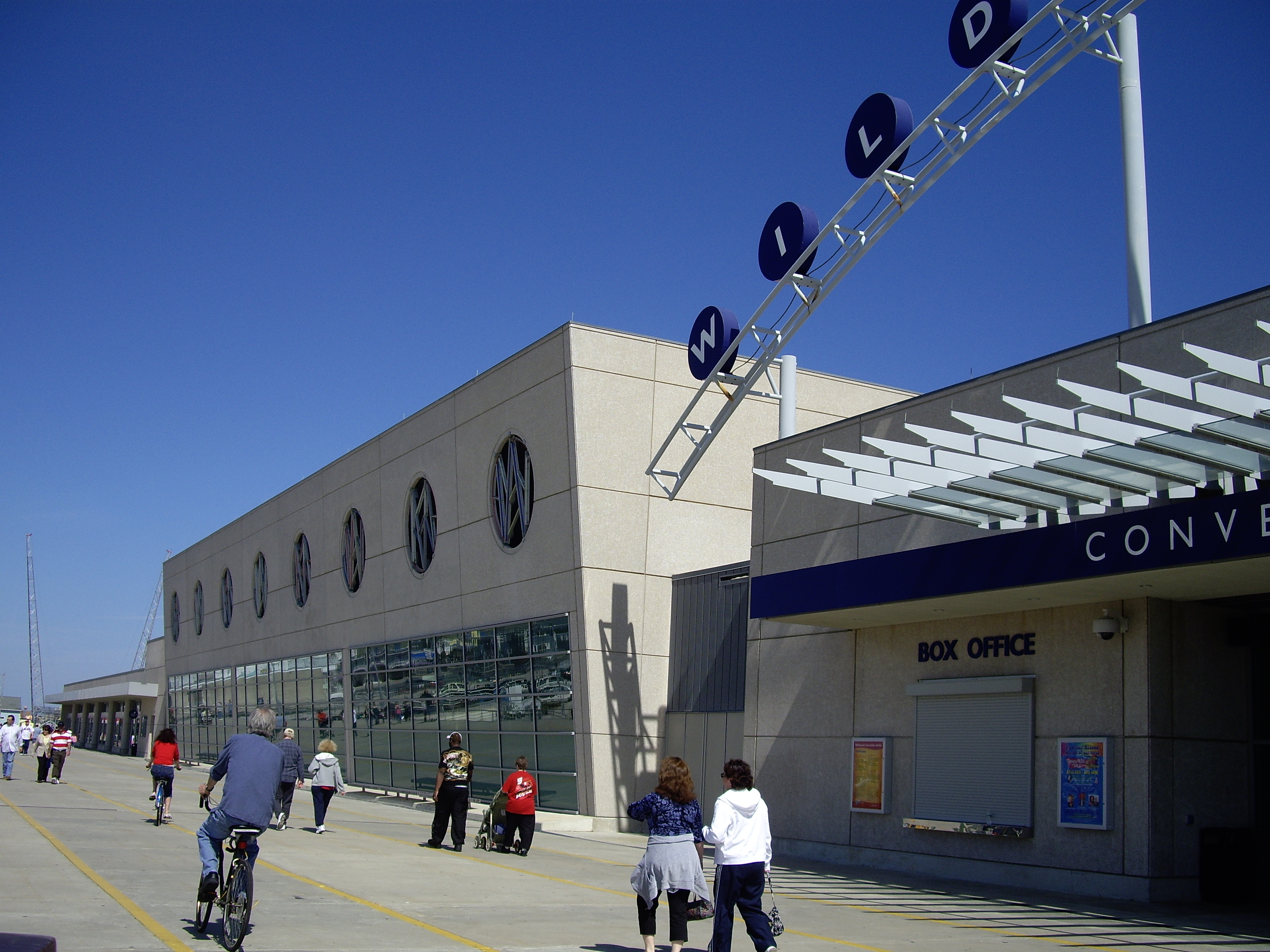
Wildwoods Convention Center

- Cozy Morley, a popular entertainer and club owner, recorded a song called On the Way to Cape May.
- Wildwood is home to the beverage known as the "Lime Rickey".
- The song "Wildwood Days" by Bobby Rydell is about the shore town.
- The song "Everything's Wild in Wildwood" by The Treniers was inspired by summers in the early 1950s during which they played residencies at a night club in the town.
- 1967: The psychedelic rock band Nazz releases "Wildwood Blues", a song about Wildwood scene.
- 1975: A portion of the rock band Kiss's 1975 album Alive! was recorded from a July 23, 1975 concert at the old Wildwoods Convention Center.
- In the 1987 movie Wall Street, when Charlie Sheen's character tells Daryl Hannah's character she could have bought a beach house for four hundred thousand dollars (the value of a painting they were looking at) she sardonically replies, "Sure you could, in Wildwood, New Jersey".
- 2005: WWE Raw came to the Wildwood Convention Center late summer of 2005. WWE SmackDown came to the Wildwood Convention Center late summer of 2006. WWE Raw broke an attendance record at the Wildwood convention center on August 10, 2007.
- A CKY song entitled "The Boardwalk Body" was written about a body found under the boardwalk on one of lead singer Deron Miller's childhood trips to Wildwood.
- The video for Jason Aldean's song "Laughed Until We Cried" is set in Wildwood.
- 2008: The documentary Wildwood Days is released, featuring Chubby Checker, Dick Clark, Bobby Rydell, and Bruce Willis describe their experiences with Wildwood's rock music history during the 1950s and 1960s.
- 2008: The movie Wipe Out is released, featuring beach scenes filmed in Wildwood.
- A season 4 episode of Hoarders features Randy Senna, the owner of "Randyland" based out of Wildwood.
- Summer 2016: the Travel Channel filmed Season 8, Episode 6 of the television show Hotel Impossible at the White Caps Motel in Wildwood.
- September 2017: The movie Wetlands, featuring Heather Graham, was partly filmed in Wildwood.

== Notable people ==
People who were born in, residents of, or otherwise closely associated with Wildwood include:

- Joseph R. Applegate (1925–2003), linguistics expert who was the first black faculty member at the Massachusetts Institute of Technology
- J. Thompson Baker (1847–1919), represented New Jersey's 2nd congressional district from 1913 to 1915, and was the first mayor of the consolidated city of Wildwood
- Randy Beverly (born 1944), former NFL cornerback who played for the New York Jets
- William H. Bright (1863–1933), politician who served as mayor of Wildwood and represented Cape May County in the New Jersey Senate from 1919 to 1927
- Edwin Corle (1906–1956), author
- Ace Darling (born 1975), professional wrestler
- Remy Hamilton (born 1974), Arena Football League player, Los Angeles Avengers
- Joy Bright Hancock (1898–1986), one of the first female U.S. Navy officers
- Wes Hills (born 1995), American football running back who has played in the NFL for the Detroit Lions
- Ernest Ingenito (1924–1995), mass murderer who shot nine people and killed five in a 1950 rampage
- Robert E. Kay (1916–1990), politician who served in the New Jersey Senate and New Jersey General Assembly
- Betty Jackson King (1928–1994), pianist, singer, teacher, choral conductor and composer who was best known for her vocal works
- Sue Lowden (born 1952), former member of the Nevada Senate who was Miss New Jersey in 1973
- Joey Maggs (1969–2006), professional wrestler
- Guy F. Muziani (1925–1988), politician who served in the New Jersey General Assembly from the 1st Legislative District from 1982 to 1988 and served 11 years as mayor of Wildwood
- Bernie Parent (born 1945), goalie for Boston Bruins, Toronto Maple Leafs and most notably Philadelphia Flyers where he back-stopped the team to two consecutive Stanley Cups
- Phelps Phelps (1897–1981), politician who served as governor of American Samoa and the United States Ambassador to the Dominican Republic
- Mickey Shaughnessy (1920–1985), actor
- George Sheldon (1947–2018), Acting Assistant Secretary for the Administration for Children and Families who served in the Florida House of Representatives

Preceded by North Wildwood	Beaches of New Jersey	Succeeded by Wildwood Crest
