= Ernest Ingenito =

American spree killer (1924–1995)

- Ingenito's booking photo in 1950
- Born: May 27, 1924; Wildwood, New Jersey, U.S.
- Died: October 7, 1995 (aged 71); New Jersey State Prison, New Jersey, U.S.
- Spouse: Theresa Mazzoli
- Children: 2
- Status: Deceased
- Motive: Revenge
- Convictions: First degree murder (5 counts); Sexual assault (29 counts)
- Penalty: Life imprisonment (1951); 50 years imprisonment (1995)

Details
- Date: November 17, 1950
- Locations: Franklin Township and Minotola, New Jersey
- Targets: His wife and her family
- Killed: 6 (including an unborn infant)
- Injured: 4
- Weapons: Luger P08; Mauser C96; .32 caliber rifle

Ernest Martin "Ernie" Ingenito (May 27, 1924 – October 7, 1995) was an American spree killer who shot nine people, his wife Theresa Mazzoli and her family, killing five and injuring four, on November 17, 1950, in Franklin Township and Minotola, New Jersey.

== Early life ==
Ingenito was born in Wildwood, New Jersey, on May 27, 1924, to Ernest and his wife, Helen (née Martin) Ingenito. He was the oldest of three children and was born into a family of Italian descent. The family moved frequently between Wildwood and Philadelphia, and his parents finally separated when he was thirteen. Ingenito first got in trouble for stealing when he was ten and was first sent to a reformatory at fourteen. He continued to go in and out of reformatories for the next few years until he was paroled and allowed to return to Wildwood to live with his mother.

At age 17, Ingenito married 16-year-old Doris Breslin. Breslin became pregnant soon after and later gave birth to the couple's first child, a daughter, Dorothy. During the marriage, Ingenito was reportedly abusive towards his wife. Two years into the marriage, Ingenito was drafted to serve in the US Army; during World War II, he was stationed at Fort Belvoir in Virginia. He was dishonorably discharged in 1946 after being court-martialed twice: once for going AWOL (Ingenito left without permission after hearing that his wife was living with another man), and a second for striking two superior officers. He served two years of an eight-year sentence at Green Haven Correctional Facility, the military prison at Sing Sing, for the second offense.

Ingenito and Doris were later divorced.

== Marriage to Theresa Mazzoli ==
Shortly after his discharge, Ingenito married 21-year-old Theresa Mazzoli, the daughter of Michael and Pearl Mazzoli, who owned a truck farm on Piney Hollow Road in Franklin Township, Gloucester County, New Jersey. Theresa convinced Ingenito to move in with her family and the young couple initially appeared to have had a happy marriage. Ingenito worked on the farm and they had two sons. While Ingenito got along well with his father-in-law, Michael, he did not like his mother-in-law, Pearl.

The relationship between Ingenito and his wife and her family rapidly deteriorated after he took an outside job at a local appliance store. When Michael came to believe that his son-in-law was seeing other women, he threw Ingenito out of the house. Ingenito moved a few miles away to board with Al and Kay Rulis, friends of his father. As Theresa proceeded with plans for a divorce, Ingenito reportedly contacted lawyers about seeing his children. In the meantime, he had taken up target shooting and began buying ammunition at local stores for his growing gun collection.

== Killings ==
At about 8 p.m. on November 17, 1950, Ingenito armed himself with a Luger, a Mauser C96, and a .32 caliber rifle and drove to the Mazzoli house. He confronted Theresa and demanded to see their children; when Michael intervened, Ingenito shot him twice, killing him. As Theresa fled into the adjacent dining room, Ingenito shot her in the stomach and shoulder.

When his mother-in-law Pearl fled across the street to her parents’ home, Ingenito followed. He shot her mother, Theresa Pioppi, in the doorway, then stepped over her body to shoot and kill his wife's pregnant aunt, Marion Pioppi. He wounded his wife's nine-year-old cousin, Jeannie, then shot and killed Pearl Mazzoli, who tried to hide in a closet. Ingenito also killed John Pioppi, one of Pearl's brothers, who had chased after Ingenito with a knife.

Ingenito continued his killing spree, driving to Minotola, where Theresa's aunt and uncle, Frank and Hilda Mazzoli, lived. He shot both of them in front of their two younger children, Barbara and Frank Jr. Although critically wounded, both survived. Ingenito was arrested by the New Jersey State Police. Although he confessed to the killings during questioning, he later refused to sign a statement admitting his guilt.

== Sentencing ==
Ingenito was initially sentenced to life imprisonment for the murder of Pearl Mazzoli. His lawyer, Frank Sahl, was able to persuade the jury to recommend mercy, telling them that they did not want the responsibility of sending him to the electric chair. While all four counts of assault were dismissed, five years passed before he was brought to court on the four additional murder charges. Although his attorneys initially planned to plead that he was not guilty by reason of insanity, they later changed that plea to one of "no contest" on all four counts. The judge allowed him to serve all five sentences concurrently.

At the time, the recommendation for mercy for Ingenito drew public outrage. Governor Alfred E. Driscoll expressed surprise over the outcome, but begrudgingly accepted it.

"As a private citizen I am shocked, as I suppose many others are, by the verdict. But as Governor, I see nothing that calls for my official intervention. I assume that the trial was conducted fairly by a competent judge and a competent jury. Under constitutional law, I don't believe there is anything I can do."

== Later years and death ==
Since New Jersey did not have a life sentence without possibility of parole at the time, Ingenito was released in 1974 and lived in Trenton, where he worked for Trap Rock Industries.

In 1994, Ingenito was arrested again, this time for sexual assault of the daughter of his girlfriend. Ingenito was found guilty on 29 counts of sexual assault which took place over the span of six years, starting when she was eight years old. The girl testified that he had threatened to kill her and her mother if she said anything. To show her that he was serious, Ingenito also read her a section about his family massacre in the crime encyclopedia Bloodletters and Badmen.

Ingenito was sentenced to 50 years in prison. He died in prison of heart failure on October 7, 1995.

== See also ==
- Crime in New Jersey
- Gun violence in the United States
- Howard Unruh, another New Jersey–based spree killer
- List of rampage killers
- Mass shootings in the United States
