= Ralph Lewis (basketball) =

American basketball player and coach

Personal information
- Born: March 28, 1963 (age 63) Philadelphia, Pennsylvania, U.S.
- Listed height: 6 ft 6 in (1.98 m)
- Listed weight: 200 lb (91 kg)

Career information
- High school: Frankford (Philadelphia, Pennsylvania)
- College: La Salle (1981–1985)
- NBA draft: 1985: 6th round, 139th overall pick
- Drafted by: Boston Celtics
- Playing career: 1985–1994
- Position: Shooting guard
- Number: 35, 22, 11

Career history
- 1985–1986: Bay State Bombardiers
- 1986: Wildwood Aces
- 1986–1987: Pensacola Tornados
- 1987: Philadelphia Aces
- 1987–1988: Detroit Pistons
- 1988: Philadelphia Aces
- 1988–1989: Charlotte Hornets
- 1989–1990: Sioux Falls Skyforce
- 1990: Detroit Pistons
- 1991–1992: Sioux Falls Skyforce
- 1992–1993: Rapid City Thrillers
- 1993–1994: Columbus Horizon

Career highlights
- Robert V. Geasey Trophy winner (1984)

Career NBA statistics
- Points: 229 (2.3 ppg)
- Rebounds: 118 (1.2 rpg)
- Assists: 29 (0.3 apg)
- Stats at NBA.com
- Stats at Basketball Reference

Ralph Adolphus Lewis (born March 28, 1963) is an American former professional basketball player. He was a 6-foot-6-inch (198 cm), 200-pound (91 kg) guard and attended La Salle University.

== La Salle ==
In college, Lewis scored 1,807 points (15.6 ppg average) in his four years at La Salle. He was named to the First Team All-MAAC (1983–1984 and 1984–1985) and First Team All Big 5 in 1984 and 1985. Lewis received the Geasey Award as the Big 5 Player of the Year in 1984, when he helped the Explorers become Big 5 co-champions. He was inducted into La Salle Hall of Athletes in 1990 and the Big 5 Hall of Fame in 1991.

== NBA ==
Lewis was selected by the Boston Celtics in the 1985 NBA draft and began his career in 1987 with the Detroit Pistons. He also played with the Charlotte Hornets.

== Coaching career ==
Lewis became an assistant coach with the Seattle SuperSonics in 2005. Prior to that he was the head coach of the NBA Development League's Huntsville Flight for three seasons, compiling a 73–71 win–loss record. On December 26, 2010, Lewis was one of three assistants hired to serve under interim Charlotte Bobcats head coach Paul Silas.

== Personal life ==
In 2006, while Lewis was an assistant with the Sonics, his 82-year-old maternal grandmother was killed in Philadelphia. She suffered multiple stab wounds to her chest and throat.

== Career statistics ==
Legend
GP	Games played	GS	Games started	MPG	Minutes per game
FG%	Field goal percentage	3P%	3-point field goal percentage	FT%	Free throw percentage
RPG	Rebounds per game	APG	Assists per game	SPG	Steals per game
BPG	Blocks per game	PPG	Points per game	**Bold**	Career high

=== NBA ===
==== Regular season ====
Year	Team	GP	GS	MPG	FG%	3P%	FT%	RPG	APG	SPG	BPG	PPG
1987–88	Detroit	**50**	0	6.2	.310	.000	.604	1.0	.3	**.3**	**.1**	1.7
1988–89	Charlotte	42	0	**8.0**	.479	**.333**	.487	1.5	**.4**	**.3**	**.1**	3.2
1989–90	Detroit	4	0	1.5	.000	–	–	.0	.0	.0	.0	.0
1989–90	Charlotte	3	0	6.7	**.667**	–	**1.000**	**2.0**	.0	**.3**	.0	**3.3**
Career		99	0	6.8	.414	.250	.562	1.2	.3	.3	.1	2.3

==== Playoffs ====
Year	Team	GP	GS	MPG	FG%	3P%	FT%	RPG	APG	SPG	BPG	PPG
1988	Detroit	10	0	1.7	.333	.000	–	.8	.1	.0	.0	.4
