= Boardwalk Bullet =

Roller coaster at Kemah Boardwalk

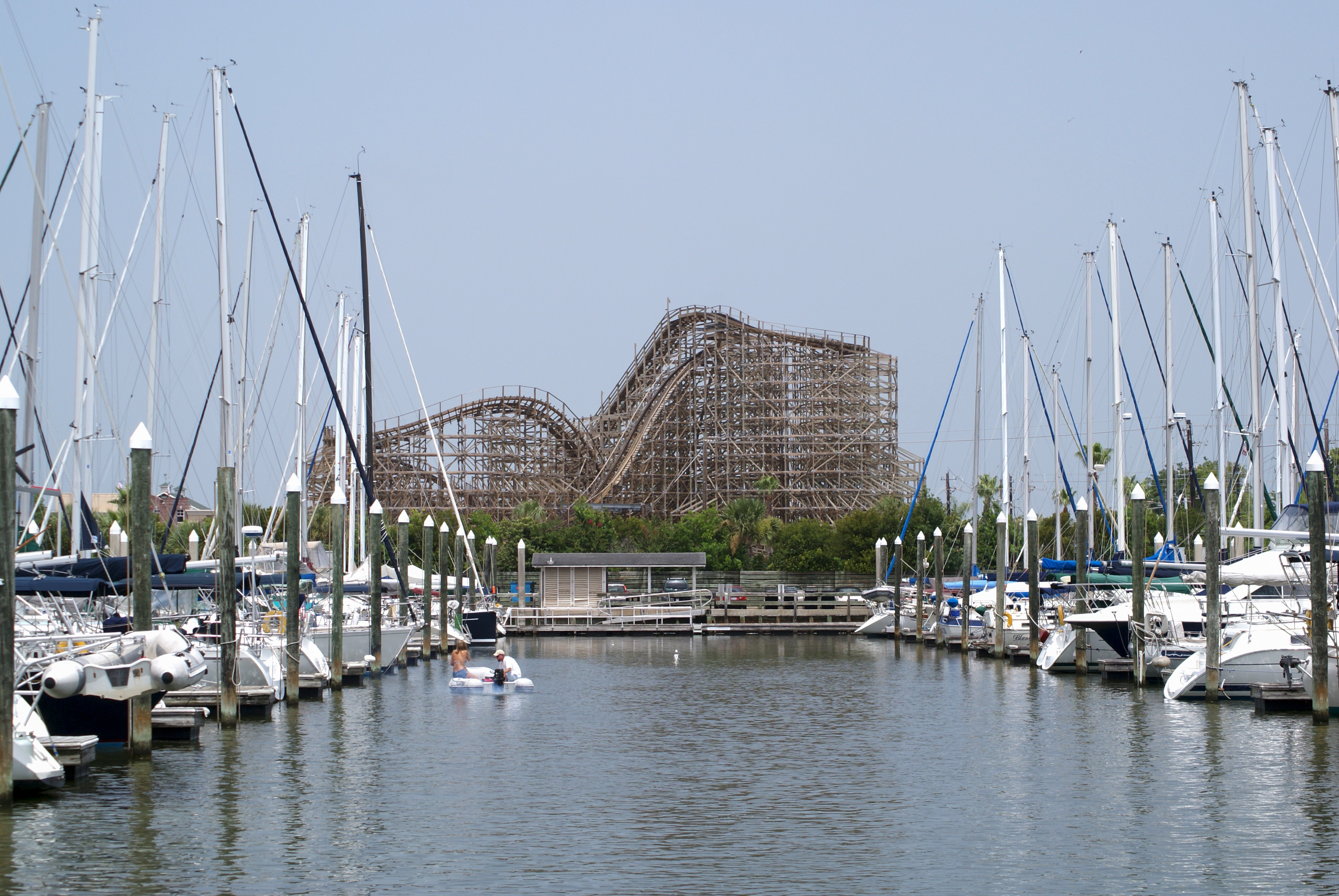
- Boardwalk Bullet as seen from across the marina

Kemah Boardwalk
- Location: Kemah Boardwalk
- Coordinates: 29.546254°N 95.017261°W
- Status: Operating
- Opening date: August 31, 2007
- Cost: $3.044 million

General statistics
- Type: Wood – Twister
- Manufacturer: Martin & Vleminckx
- Designer: The Gravity Group
- Lift/launch system: Chain lift hill
- Height: 96 ft (29 m)
- Drop: 92 ft (28 m)
- Length: 3,236 ft (986 m)
- Speed: 51 mph (82 km/h)
- Inversions: 0
- Duration: 1:45
- Max vertical angle: 55°
- Capacity: 800 riders per hour
- G-force: 3.5
- Height restriction: 48 in (122 cm)
- Trains: 2 trains with 6 cars; riders arranged 2 across in 2 rows for a total of 24 riders per train
- Boardwalk Bullet at RCDB

Boardwalk Bullet is a wooden roller coaster at the Kemah Boardwalk amusement park in Kemah, Texas, United States. The ride opened on August 31, 2007, and is the only wooden roller coaster in the Greater Houston area, as well as being one of only four wooden coasters in Texas. It is 96 feet (29 m) tall, features a drop of 92 feet (28 m), and is 3,236 feet (986 m) long, with top speeds of 51 mph (82 km/h). It has a maximum vertical angle of 56 degrees.

The ride was designed by The Gravity Group. At a cost of $3.044 million, it was built on a 1-acre (0.40 ha) footprint, making it the most compact wooden coaster in the world, with 42 track crossovers. A full ride experience on Boardwalk Bullet lasts approximately one minute and 45 seconds.

The ride has two trains built by Philadelphia Toboggan Coasters. Each train has six cars, and each car seats four riders in two rows of two, for a total of 24 riders per train.

== Awards ==
Golden Ticket Awards: Top wood Roller Coasters
Year									1998	1999
Ranking									–	–
Year	2000	2001	2002	2003	2004	2005	2006	2007	2008	2009
Ranking	–	–	–	–	–	–	–	–	39	37
Year	2010	2011	2012	2013	2014	2015	2016	2017	2018	2019
Ranking	38	17	39	34	35	43	50	14	33	31
Year	2020	2021	2022	2023	2024	2025	2026			
Ranking	N/A	22	21	30 (tie)	25	21	21			
