= Kemah Boardwalk =

Amusement park and boardwalk in Kemah, Texas, United States

- Interactive map of Kemah Boardwalk
- Location: Kemah, Texas, United States
- Coordinates: 29°32′52″N 95°1′2″W
- Opened: 1998; 28 years ago
- Owner: Landry's
- Operating season: Year-round

Attractions
- Total: 15
- Roller coasters: 1
- Water rides: 1
- Website: www.kemahboardwalk.com

Kemah Boardwalk is a 60-acre boardwalk and amusement park in Kemah, Texas, United States. The boardwalk is built entirely along the shores of Galveston Bay and Clear Lake. The complex is owned and operated by Landry's, and has rides, restaurants, midway games, a boutique hotel, a charter yacht, a 400-slip marina, and shops. There is no charge to walk on the boardwalk, but tickets are sold for individual rides.

== History ==
In October 1997, the development of an “entertainment project” was announced. Development of the Boardwalk Inn Hotel as well as retail stores, restaurants, a pedestrian boardwalk, and several amusement rides all started development. The Kemah Boardwalk and amusements opened to the public in 1998.

In 2002, the Boardwalk Beast Speedboat attraction opened, offering rides on Galveston Bay. In 2007, the Boardwalk Bullet wooden roller coaster was installed. The ride is built on a 1-acre footprint and is one of the most compact roller coasters in the world.

In 2008, Hurricane Ike hit the boardwalk, causing damage.

In 2026, construction began on Boardwalk Bay, a water park with 11 water slides and resort-style amenities.

== Rides ==
Name	Year opened	Manufacturer	Type	Notes
Aviator	Unknown	Chance Rides/Larson International	Aviator	
Boardwalk Beast Speedboat	2002	Unknown	Speedboat	Upcharge attraction
Boardwalk Bullet	2007	The Gravity Group, Martin & Vleminckx	Wooden roller coaster	
Boardwalk Tower	Unknown	Chance Rides	Observation tower	
C.P. Huntington Train	Unknown	Chance Rides	Miniature train	
Century Ferris Wheel	Unknown	Chance Rides	Ferris wheel	
Double Decker Carousel	Unknown	Chance Rides	Carousel	
Drop Zone	2008	Larson International/A.R.M. Rides	Drop tower	
Flare	2014	Larson International	Super Loop	
HypnoSpin	2017	Larson International	Tilt-A-Whirl	
Iron Eagle Zip Line	Unknown	Unknown	Zip line	Upcharge attraction
Jungle Bounce	Unknown	S&S – Sansei Technologies	Miniature drop tower	
Pharaoh's Fury	2002	Chance Rides	Swinging ship	
Rockin' Rocket	Unknown	Zamperla	Rockin' Tug	
Wonder Wheel	Unknown	Zamperla	Miniature Ferris wheel	
