= Joseph R. Applegate =

American academic (1925–2003)

- Born: Joseph Roye Applegate; December 4, 1925; Wildwood, New Jersey, US
- Died: October 18, 2003 (aged 77); Washington, D.C., US
- Resting place: Glenwood Cemetery, Washington, D.C., United States
- Education: Temple University; University of Pennsylvania
- Scientific career
- Fields: Linguistics
- Workplaces: Massachusetts Institute of Technology

Joseph Roye Applegate (December 4, 1925 – October 18, 2003) was an American linguist. He was the first Black faculty member at the Massachusetts Institute of Technology, in 1955. In the 1960s, he started working at Howard University and became a professor emeritus of African Studies and it was there that he started the nation's first Ph.D. program in African Studies.

== Early life and family ==
Joseph Applegate was born in Wildwood, New Jersey. His parents operated a boarding house.

== Career ==
Applegate received his master's and PhD in linguistics from the University of Pennsylvania, after which he began his career at MIT in the Research Laboratory of Electronics in 1955. At the Research Laboratory of Electronics he studied the mechanical translation of languages. In 1959, he became the director of MIT's new language laboratory. At MIT he taught linguistics with such peers as Noam Chomsky and Morris Halle. He left MIT and worked at the University of California in Los Angeles from 1960 to 1966. In 1966, he started working at Howard University and became a professor of African studies in 1969. He was the director of the African Studies and Research Program from 1967 to 1969.
