= Wildwoods Convention Center =

Indoor arena in Wildwood, New Jersey

Coordinates: 38.9874°N 74.8099°W

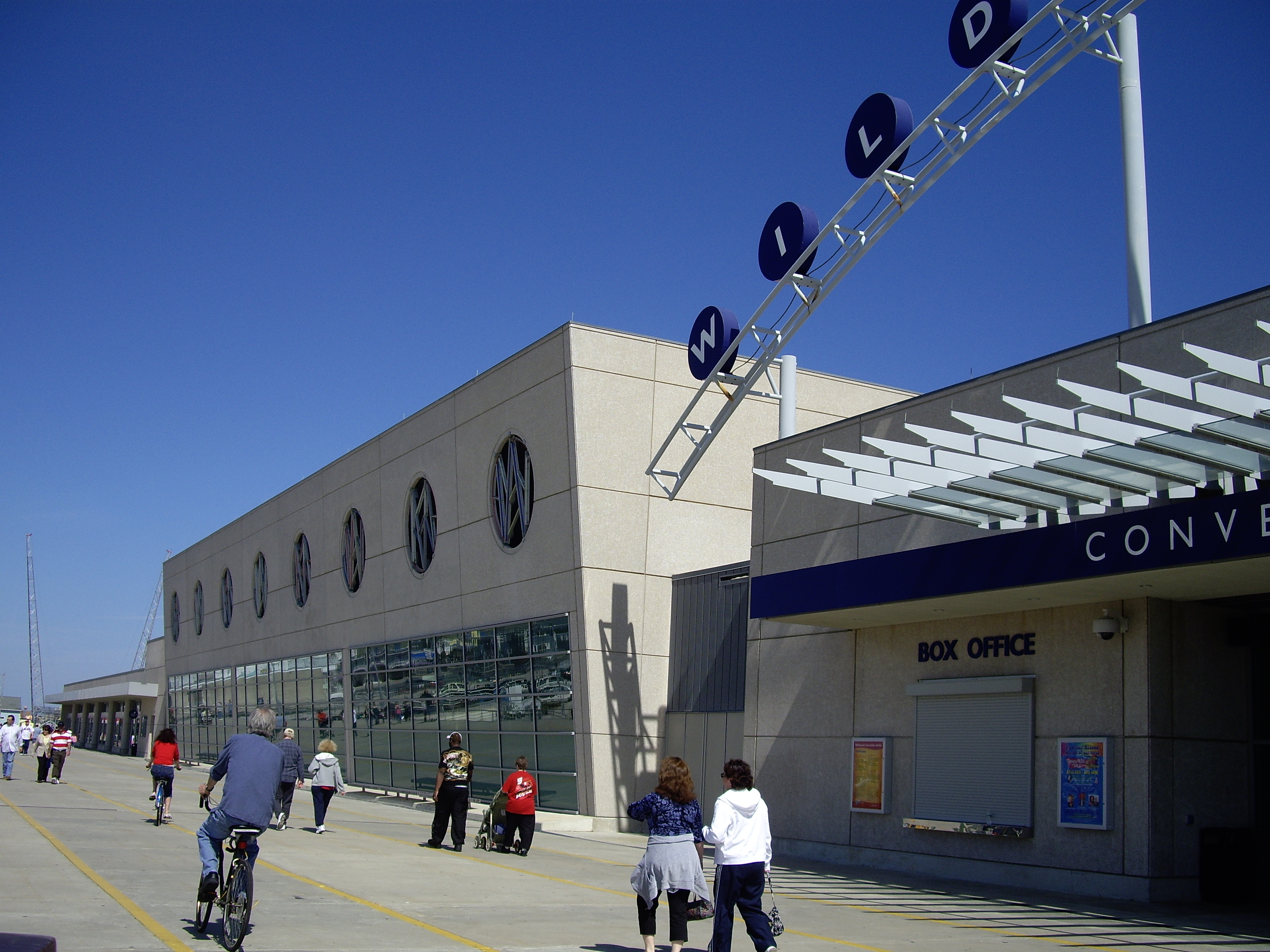
- Interactive map of Wildwoods Convention Center
- Location: 4501 Boardwalk; Wildwood, New Jersey
- Owner: New Jersey Sports and Exposition Authority
- Operator: ASM Global
- Capacity: 7,000
- Surface: 260,000 sq ft

Construction
- Groundbreaking: 2000
- Opened: 2001
- Architect: LMN Architects

The Wildwoods Convention Center is a convention center and indoor arena in Wildwood, New Jersey. Built in 2001 to replace an older Convention Hall, the center has exhibition space of 260,000 sq ft (24,000 m^{2}). The building includes the Oceanfront Arena, an indoor arena that can seat up to 7,000 spectators. It is owned by the New Jersey Sports and Exposition Authority and managed by The Greater Wildwoods Tourism Improvement and Development Authority (GWTIDA). The architect for the Convention Center is LMN Architects.

== History ==
In 1972, Wildwood Convention Hall, a 18,000 sq ft (2,000 m^{2}) building, opened with several stores in front. Located on the Boardwalk at 4522 Ocean Avenue, it was used until the need for a larger convention center and arena were made in 1999. NJSEA promptly joined in, and broke ground in 2000, tearing a 40 feet (12 m) hole in the boardwalk in the process, opening the new building in 2001, and the following year, razed the old hall, creating the new dramatic entrance way for the facility.

The Wildwood Hi-Rollers played home games at the Wildwoods Convention Center during the 1981–82 Continental Basketball Association season.

On January 28, 2020, then President Donald Trump held a rally at the Wildwoods Convention Center.

== Annual events ==
WWE's Raw brand has staged an annual event every July in the arena, setting a record attendance in 2005. In addition, annual concerts celebrating the 1960s (in May) and 1950's (in October) are staged there, as well as an annual high school basketball tournament billed as the largest in the country running from December 26 (the day after Christmas) through New Year's Eve (December 31) for both boys and girls teams. This venue was bidding for Miss World 2015, but lost to the Beauty Crown Grand Theatre in Sanya, Hainan Island, China PR.
