= Boardwalk (entertainment district) =

Walkway along a beach or waterfront

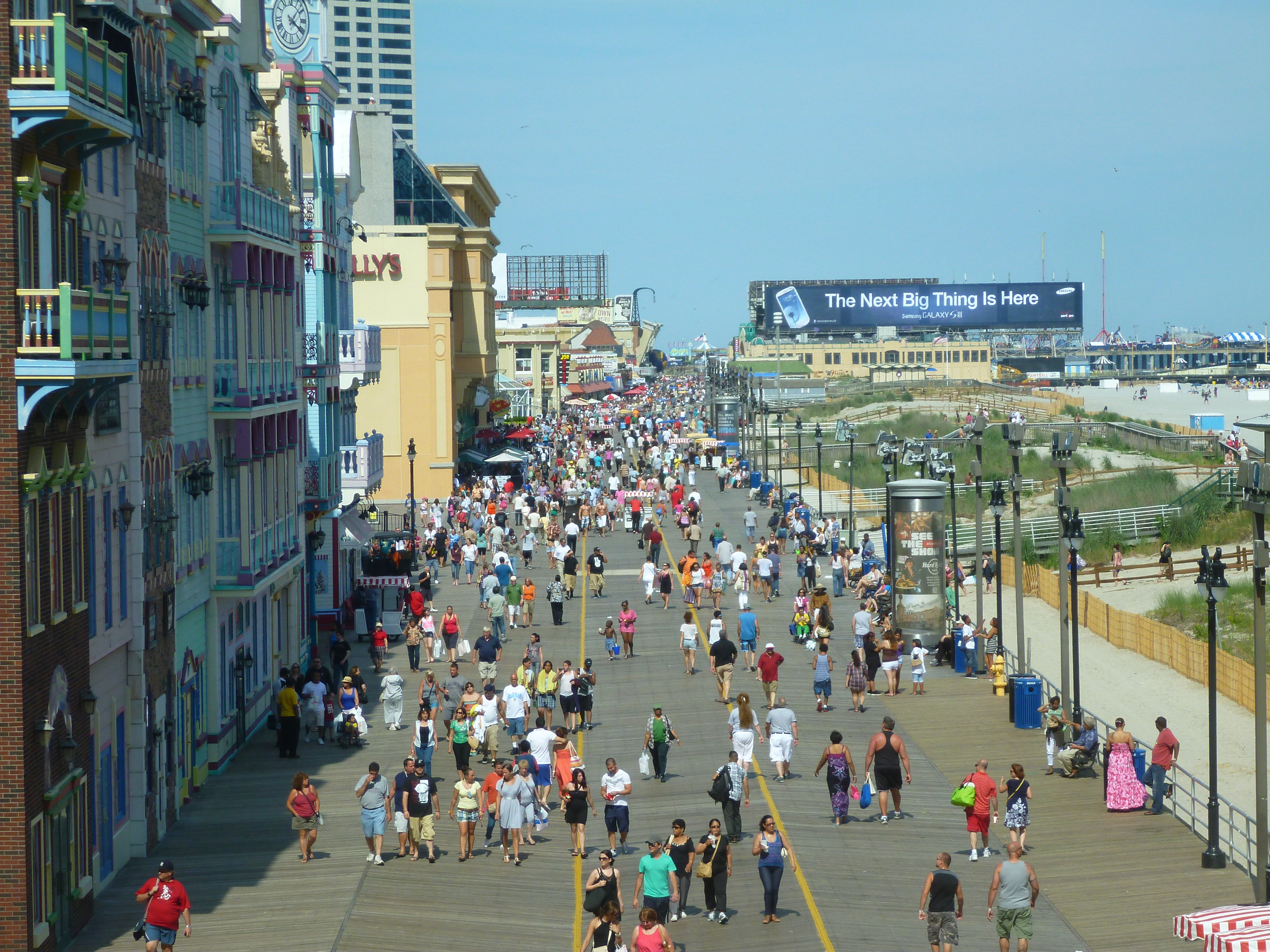
The Atlantic City, New Jersey boardwalk, as seen from Caesars Atlantic City, opened in 1870, as America’s first boardwalk. At 5 1/2 miles (9 km) long, it is also the world's longest, busiest, and oldest boardwalk. New Jersey is home to the world’s highest concentration of boardwalks.

A boardwalk is a promenade along a beach or waterfront. In North America, and particularly in the United States, many waterfront commercial boardwalks have become so successful as tourist attractions that the simple wooden pathways have been replaced by esplanades made of concrete, brick or other construction, sometimes with a wooden façade on the surface. An entertainment boardwalk often contains an amusement park, casinos, or hotels on a pier-like structure. One of the earliest such boardwalks was designed in New Jersey and opened June 26, 1870, in Atlantic City, and one of the longest is Mazatlán's Malecón, at 13 miles (21 km) of oceanfront boardwalk.

== History ==
In the 19th century, seaside living and entertainment became popular. Primarily in the Jersey Shore coastal region of New Jersey, United States, walks made of boards (hence the name 'boardwalk') began to be placed among seaside hotels and other establishments so as to prevent beach sand from being tracked into the buildings. These structures were not initially permanent, being taken down in the fall and then replaced the following spring, but eventually permanent boardwalks began to be placed. These boardwalks eventually expanded to become wider and taller to account for pedestrian traffic, and railings were added to make them safer. As the areas became more developed, more businesses began to move into boardwalk districts, and eventually amusement rides such as the carousel came to larger boardwalks. By the beginning of the 20th century, boardwalks had become destinations unto themselves, with events such as Easter parades becoming mainstays of the boardwalks. Many early boardwalk towns advertised themselves as health resorts, as physicians of the time believed that seawater had medicinal properties. In the mid-20th century, however, the popularity of boardwalks began to decline due to a combination of competition from other dedicated theme parks such as Disneyland and hurricanes attacking the outdated boardwalk infrastructure. As a result, the boardwalk lost some of its popularity. Regardless, boardwalks such as the Atlantic City Boardwalk in New Jersey, Coney Island in New York, or the Kemah Boardwalk in Texas remain popular tourist attractions to this day.

== Notable boardwalks ==
Several notable boardwalks in the United States include:

=== Atlantic City ===
The first boardwalk in the United States, the Atlantic City Boardwalk in Atlantic City, New Jersey runs for a length of 5 miles (8.0 km), including an extension that runs 1.7 miles (2.7 km) into the neighboring Ventnor City. Casinos and hotels front the boardwalk, as well as retail stores, restaurants, and amusements. Popular entertainments available on the Atlantic City Boardwalk include rolling chairs, saltwater taffy, and amusement piers such as Steel Pier.

=== Coney Island ===
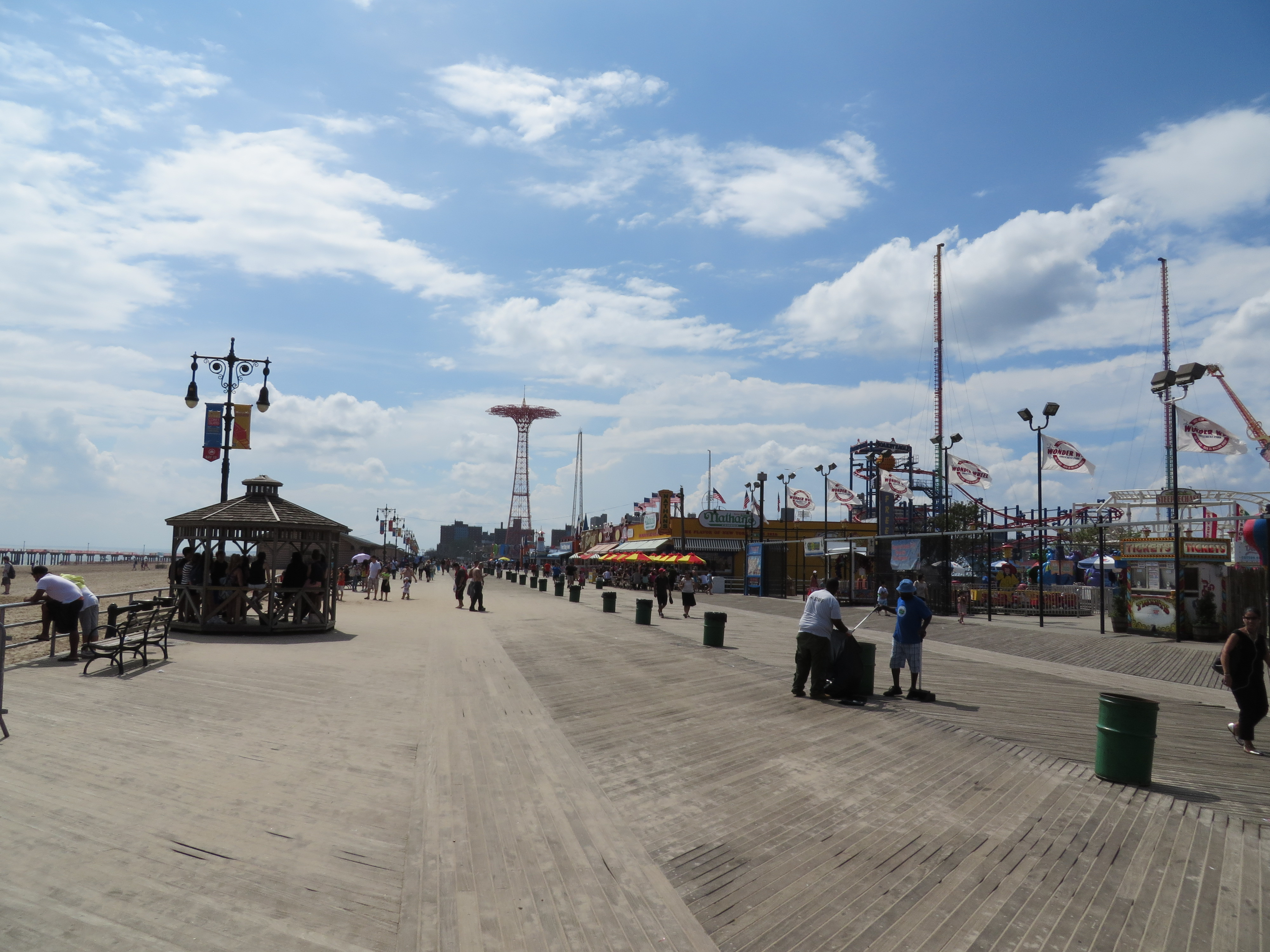
Riegelmann Boardwalk, Coney Island, Brooklyn

The Riegelmann Boardwalk runs for 2.51 miles (4.04 km) on Coney Island in New York City, along the southern shore of Brooklyn adjacent to the Atlantic Ocean. It became known for its amusement parks along the boardwalk, and contains the Cyclone roller coaster, the Wonder Wheel Ferris wheel, the Luna Park and Deno's Wonder Wheel Amusement Park amusement parks, and the defunct Parachute Jump ride, as well as the New York Aquarium.

=== Ocean City ===
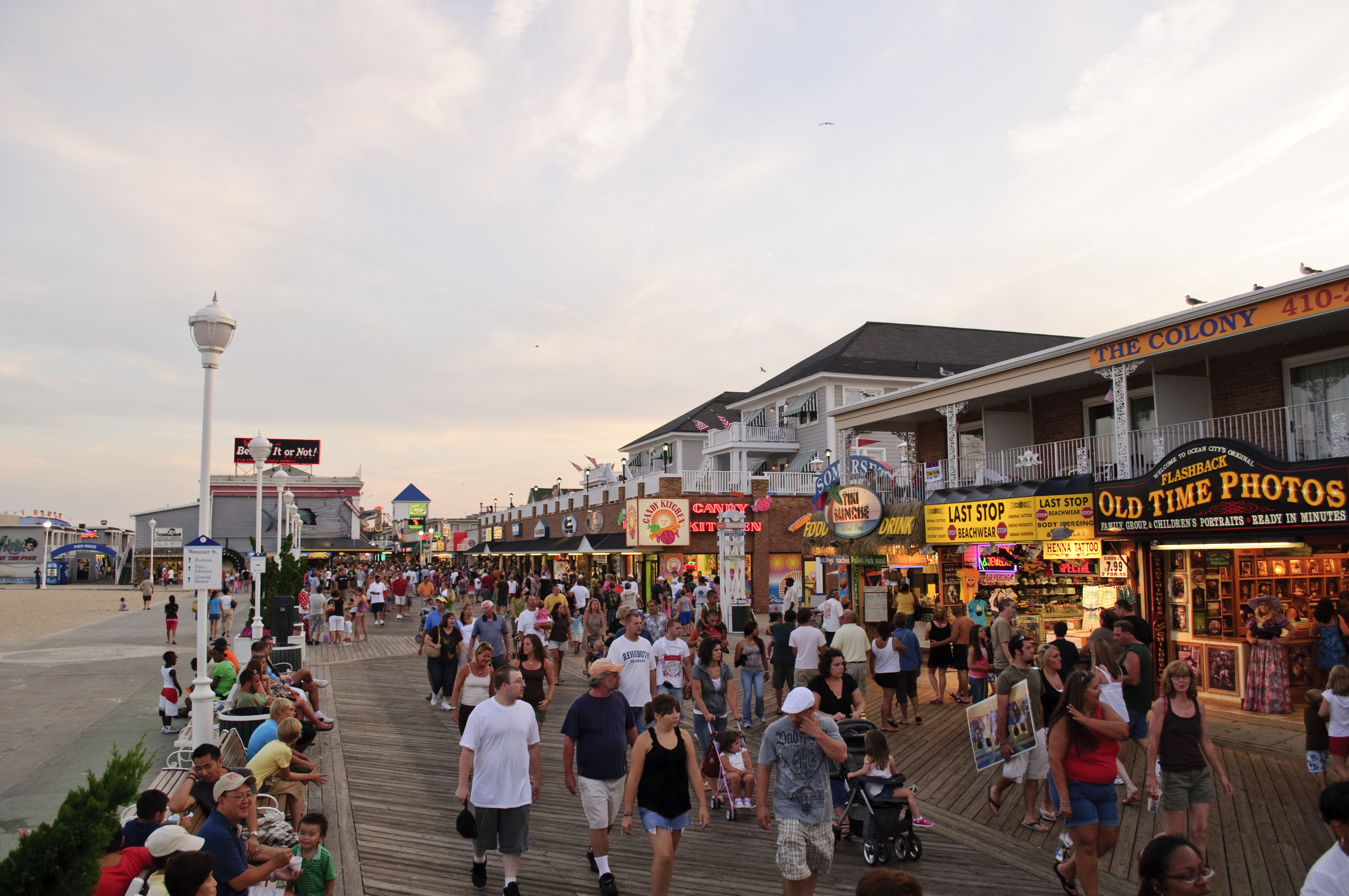
The boardwalk in Ocean City, Maryland, a wooden pathway adjacent to the beach that is lined with businesses, typical of boardwalks along the East Coast of the United States.

The 2.5 miles (4.0 km) boardwalk in Ocean City, Maryland is one of the oldest in the United States, dating to 1902. Originally called "Atlantic Avenue", it started out as temporary boards that would be stored at high tide. In 1910 a permanent boardwalk was constructed.

=== Kemah ===
The Kemah Boardwalk is a hotel and restaurant promenade in Kemah, Texas. The main attractions of the complex, which opened in 2001, are its many restaurants overlooking Galveston Bay, recreational sailing, and amusement pier. Additional attractions include a 36-foot (11 m) carousel, a 65-foot (20 m) Ferris wheel and a wooden roller coaster.
