= North Wildwood School District =

School district in Cape May County, New Jersey, US

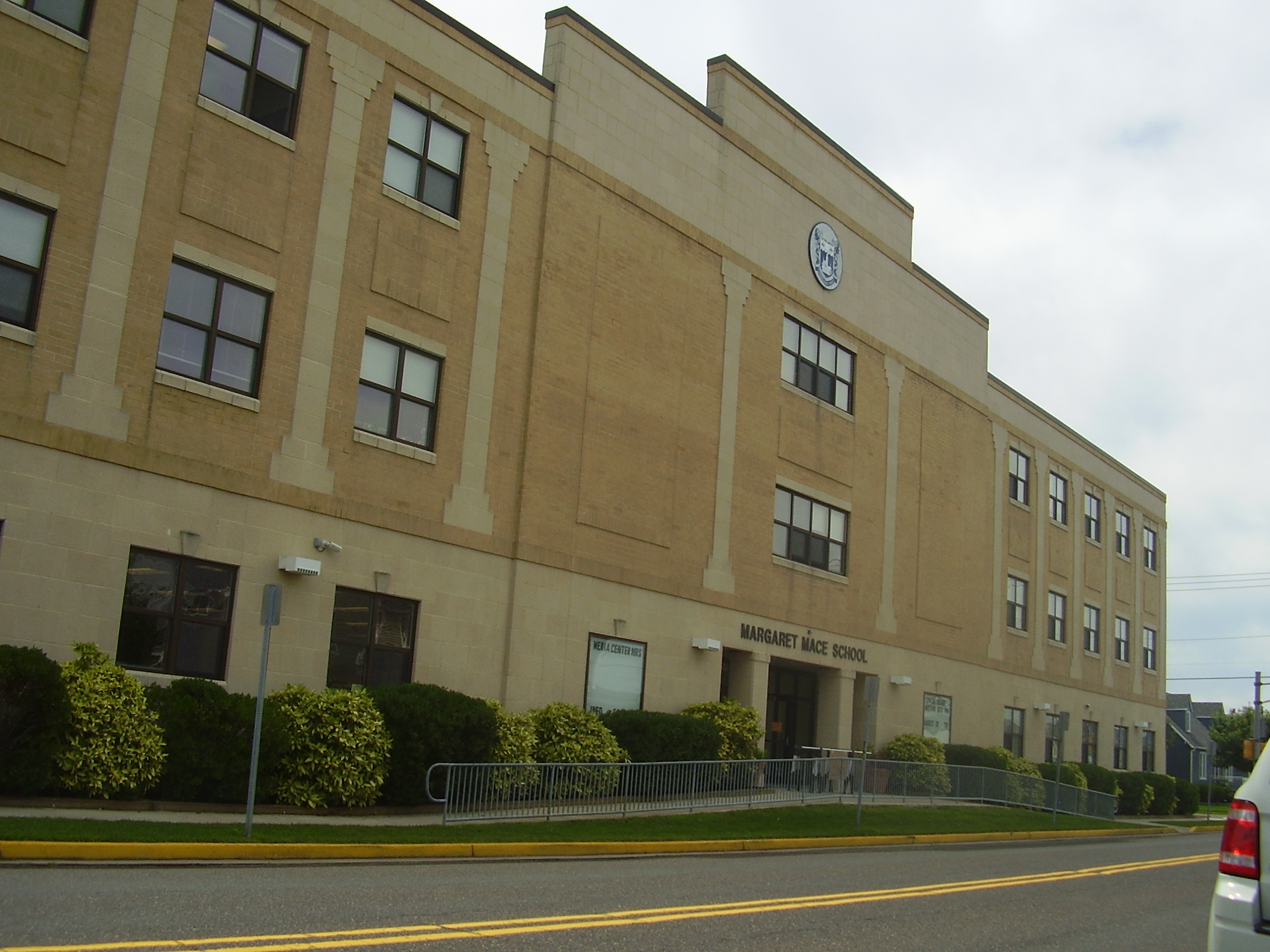
- Margaret Mace School

Address
- 1201 Atlantic Avenue North Wildwood, Cape May County, New Jersey, 08260; United States
- Coordinates: 38.999616°N 74.798009°W

District information
- Grades: PreK-8
- Superintendent: Jonathan Price
- Business administrator: Robert Delengowski (interim)
- Schools: 1

Students and staff
- Enrollment: 164 (as of 2024–25)
- Faculty: 29.0 FTEs
- Student–teacher ratio: 5.7:1

Other information
- District Factor Group: A
- Website: www.nwboe.com
Ind.	Per pupil	District spending	Rank (*)	K-8 average	%± vs. average
1A	Total Spending	$24,991	64	$18,891	32.3%
1	Budgetary Cost	21,063	64	14,159	48.8%
2	Classroom Instruction	12,162	64	8,659	40.5%
6	Support Services	4,072	64	2,167	87.9%
8	Administrative Cost	1,688	40	1,547	9.1%
10	Operations & Maintenance	2,705	60	1,612	67.8%
13	Extracurricular Activities	318	60	104	205.8%
16	Median Teacher Salary	62,003	56	61,136
Data from NJDoE 2014 Taxpayers' Guide to Education Spending. *Of K-8 districts with up to 400 students. Lowest spending=1; Highest=71

The North Wildwood School District is a community public school district that serves students in kindergarten through eighth grade from North Wildwood, in Cape May County, in the U.S. state of New Jersey. The district also serves students from West Wildwood, which has a non-operating district that sends students to North Wildwood District in a sending/receiving relationship.

As of the 2024–25 school year, the district, comprised of one school, had an enrollment of 164 students and 29.0 classroom teachers (on an FTE basis), for a student–teacher ratio of 5.7:1.

For ninth through twelfth grades, public school students from North Wildwood attend Wildwood High School in Wildwood as part of a sending/receiving relationship with the Wildwood City School District, together with students from West Wildwood and Wildwood Crest. As of the 2024–25 school year, the high school had an enrollment of 261 students and 26.4 classroom teachers (on an FTE basis), for a student–teacher ratio of 9.9:1.

== History ==
The district had been classified by the New Jersey Department of Education as being in District Factor Group "A", the lowest of eight groupings. District Factor Groups organize districts statewide to allow comparison by common socioeconomic characteristics of the local districts. From lowest socioeconomic status to highest, the categories are A, B, CD, DE, FG, GH, I and J.

By 2020, enrollment had declined since many properties in North Wildwood had been converted from being year-round rentals to summer-only or single-family housing. Additionally rentals had declined in West Wildwood due to flooding.

== Schools ==
Margaret Mace School served an enrollment of 159 students in grades PreK–8 in the 2024–25 school year.

In 2019, North Wildwood district received 20 students from West Wildwood, making up 11% of the North Wildwood district enrollment.

== Administration ==
Core members of the district's administration are:

- Jonathan Price, superintendent
- Robert Delengowski, interim business administrator and board secretary

== Board of education ==
The district's board of education, comprised of nine members, sets policy and oversees the fiscal and educational operation of the district through its administration. The West Wildwood district sends a non-voting representative to the board. As a Type II school district, the board's trustees are elected directly by voters to serve three-year terms of office on a staggered basis, with three seats up for election each year held (since 2012) as part of the November general election. The board appoints a superintendent to oversee the district's day-to-day operations and a business administrator to supervise the business functions of the district.
