= North Wildwood, New Jersey =

City in Cape May County, New Jersey, US

- City
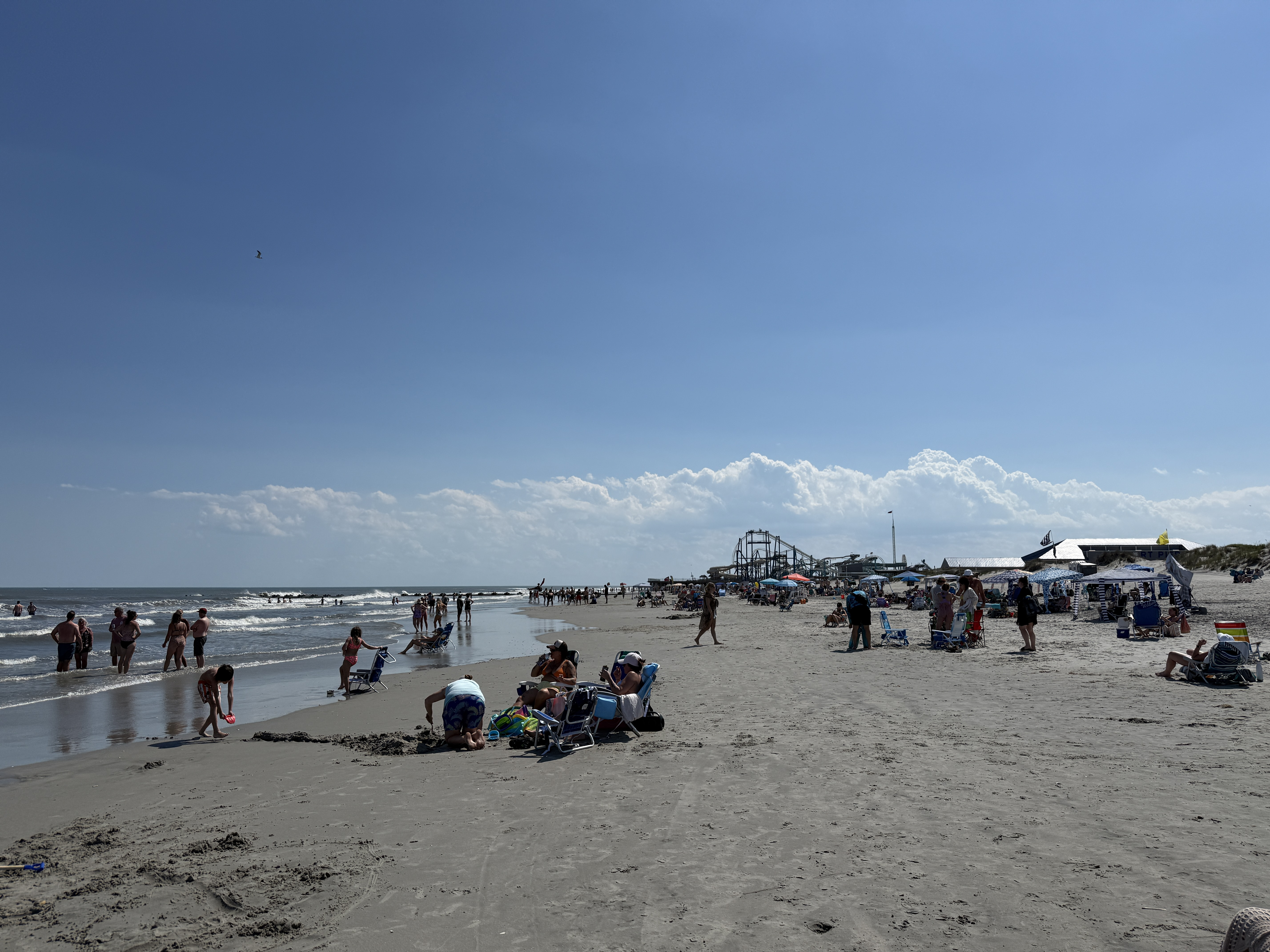
- North Wildwood's beach

- Seal

- Location of North Wildwood in Cape May County highlighted in red (left). Inset map: Location of Cape May County in New Jersey highlighted in orange (right).

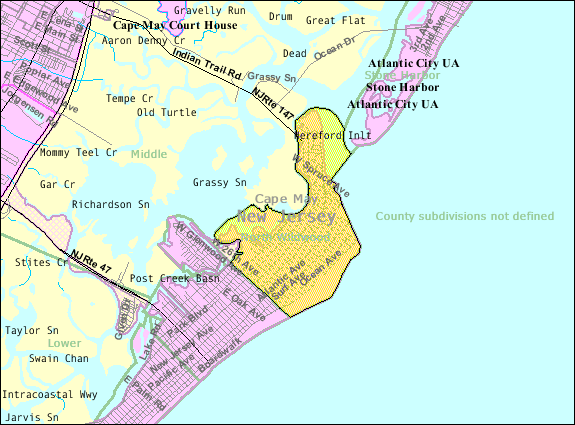
- Census Bureau map of North Wildwood, New Jersey

- Location in Cape May County Location in New Jersey Location in the United States
- Coordinates: 39.005944°N 74.797505°W
- Country: United States
- State: New Jersey
- County: Cape May
- Incorporated: June 13, 1885 as Borough of Anglesea
- Reincorporated: May 16, 1906 as Borough of North Wildwood
- Reincorporated: April 30, 1917 as City of North Wildwood

Government
  - Type: City
  - Body: City Council
  - Mayor: Salvatore T. Zampirri Sr. (R, term ends December 31, 2029)
  - Administrator: Nicholas Long
  - Municipal clerk: W. Scott Jett

Area
  - Total: 2.49 sq mi (6.46 km^{2})
  - Land: 1.73 sq mi (4.47 km^{2})
  - Water: 0.77 sq mi (2.00 km^{2}) 30.80%
  - Rank: 374th of 565 in state 10th of 16 in county
- Elevation: 3 ft (0.91 m)

Population (2020)
  - Total: 3,621
  - Estimate (2023): 3,585
  - Rank: 426th of 565 in state 7th of 16 in county
  - Density: 2,099/sq mi (810/km^{2})
  - Rank: 285th of 565 in state 3rd of 16 in county
- Time zone: UTC−05:00 (Eastern (EST))
  - Summer (DST): UTC−04:00 (Eastern (EDT))
- ZIP Code: 08260
- Area code: 609
- FIPS code: 3400953490
- GNIS feature ID: 0885328
- Website: www.northwildwood.com

North Wildwood is a city located on the Jersey Shore in Cape May County, in the U.S. state of New Jersey. The city and all of Cape May County are part of the Ocean City metropolitan statistical area, which in turn is part of the Philadelphia metropolitan area. As of the 2020 United States census, the city's population was 3,621, a decrease of 420 (−10.4%) from the 2010 census count of 4,041, which in turn had reflected a decline of 894 (−18.1%) from the 4,935 counted at the 2000 census. North Wildwood is home to the Hereford Inlet Lighthouse.

The city's beaches were ranked the fourth-best in New Jersey in the 2008 Top 10 Beaches Contest sponsored by the New Jersey Marine Sciences Consortium. North Wildwood is one of five municipalities in the state that offer free public access to oceanfront beaches monitored by lifeguards, joining Atlantic City, Wildwood, Wildwood Crest and Upper Township's Strathmere section.

== History ==
What is now North Wildwood City was originally incorporated as the borough of Anglesea on June 13, 1885, from portions of Middle Township, based on the results of a referendum held 11 days earlier. The borough was reincorporated on March 6, 1896, and again on May 4, 1897. On May 16, 1906, the Borough of North Wildwood was incorporated, replacing Anglesea Borough.

Legislation passed in April 1908 established a potential consolidation of North Wildwood and Holly Beach City into Wildwood, subject to approval of referendums in each of the three municipalities, though this merger never took effect.

On April 30, 1917, the area was reincorporated as the City of North Wildwood, in turn replacing North Wildwood borough. The city's name comes from Wildwood, which in turn was named for the area's wild flowers.

In November 2016, more than 60% of voters rejected a non-binding referendum that would ask to change the name of the city from North Wildwood to its historic name of Anglesea. Opponents cited the confusion that would be created and the impact on commerce.

== Geography ==
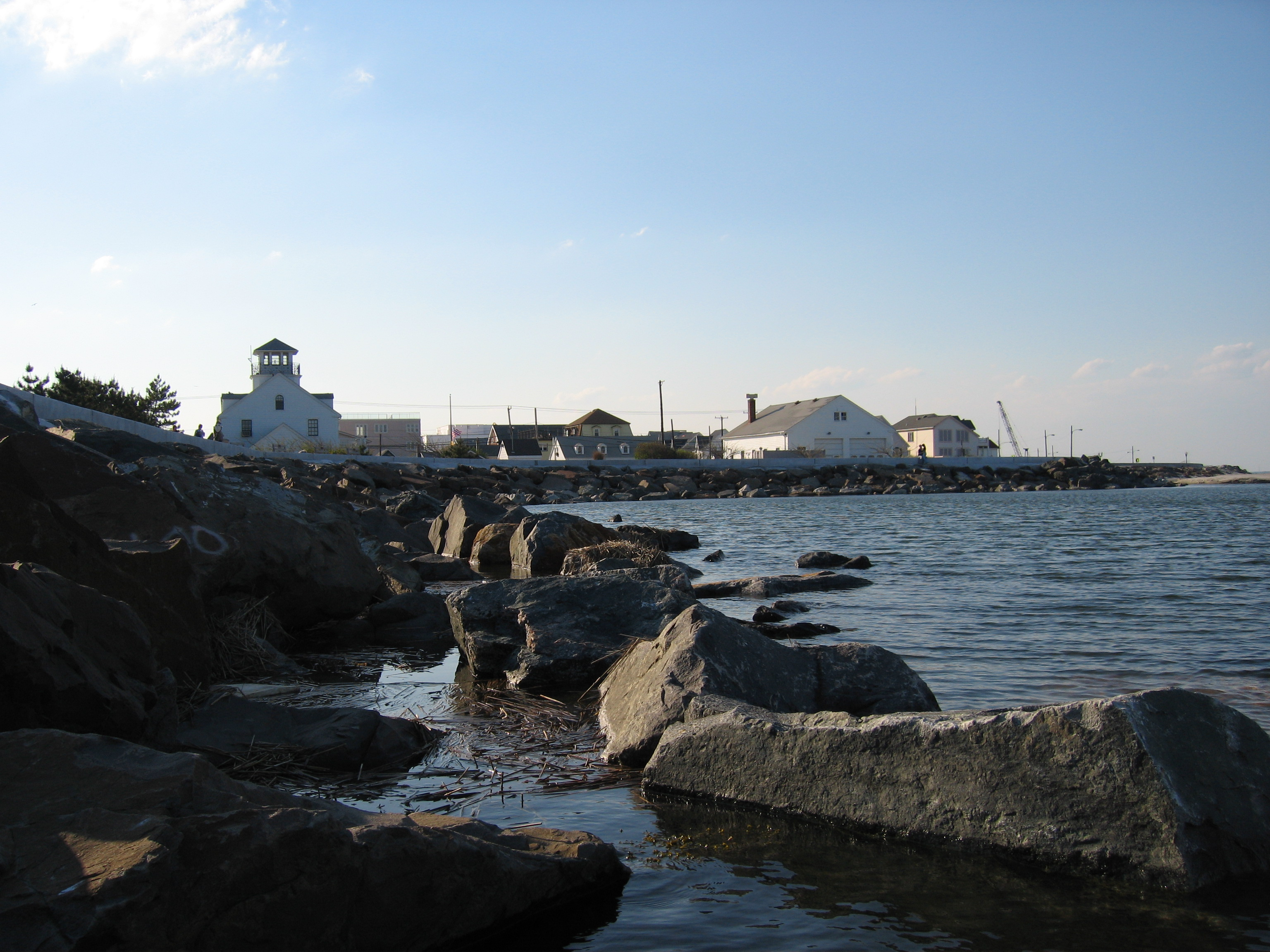
Hereford Inlet

According to the U.S. Census Bureau, the city had a total area of 2.50 square miles (6.46 km^{2}), including 1.73 square miles (4.47 km^{2}) of land and 0.77 square miles (2.00 km^{2}) of water (30.80%).

The borough borders the Cape May County municipalities of Middle Township, Stone Harbor Borough and Wildwood City, as well as the Atlantic Ocean.

== Demographics ==
Historical population
Census	Pop.	Note	%±
1890	161		—
1900	161		0.0%
1910	833		417.4%
1920	807		−3.1%
1930	2,049		153.9%
1940	1,921		−6.2%
1950	3,158		64.4%
1960	3,598		13.9%
1970	3,914		8.8%
1980	4,714		20.4%
1990	5,017		6.4%
2000	4,935		−1.6%
2010	4,041		−18.1%
2020	3,621		−10.4%
2023 (est.)	3,585		−1.0%
Population sources: 1890–2000 1890–1920; 1890–1910 1910–1930; 1940–2000 2000; 2010 2020

=== 2020 census ===
As of the 2020 census, North Wildwood had a population of 3,621. The median age was 60.5 years. 9.5% of residents were under the age of 18 and 39.5% of residents were 65 years of age or older. For every 100 females there were 92.9 males, and for every 100 females age 18 and over there were 93.1 males age 18 and over.

100.0% of residents lived in urban areas, while 0.0% lived in rural areas.

There were 1,922 households in North Wildwood, of which 10.6% had children under the age of 18 living in them. Of all households, 40.7% were married-couple households, 22.8% were households with a male householder and no spouse or partner present, and 30.8% were households with a female householder and no spouse or partner present. About 40.7% of all households were made up of individuals and 22.2% had someone living alone who was 65 years of age or older.

There were 8,984 housing units, of which 78.6% were vacant. The homeowner vacancy rate was 2.7% and the rental vacancy rate was 30.7%.

Racial composition as of the 2020 census
Race	Number	Percent
White	3,400	93.9%
Black or African American	37	1.0%
American Indian and Alaska Native	1	0.0%
Asian	7	0.2%
Native Hawaiian and Other Pacific Islander	2	0.1%
Some other race	42	1.2%
Two or more races	132	3.6%
Hispanic or Latino (of any race)	129	3.6%

=== 2010 census ===
The 2010 United States census counted 4,041 people, 2,047 households, and 1,085 families in the city. The population density was 2,305.8 per square mile (890.3/km^{2}). There were 8,840 housing units at an average density of 5,044.1 per square mile (1,947.5/km^{2}). The racial makeup was 94.98% (3,838) White, 1.14% (46) Black or African American, 0.32% (13) Native American, 0.35% (14) Asian, 0.00% (0) Pacific Islander, 1.26% (51) from other races, and 1.95% (79) from two or more races. Hispanic or Latino of any race were 4.03% (163) of the population.

Of the 2,047 households, 12.0% had children under the age of 18; 41.1% were married couples living together; 8.7% had a female householder with no husband present and 47.0% were non-families. Of all households, 41.3% were made up of individuals and 21.1% had someone living alone who was 65 years of age or older. The average household size was 1.97 and the average family size was 2.64.

13.2% of the population were under the age of 18, 5.9% from 18 to 24, 17.4% from 25 to 44, 32.9% from 45 to 64, and 30.6% who were 65 years of age or older. The median age was 54.9 years. For every 100 females, the population had 93.8 males. For every 100 females ages 18 and older there were 92.5 males.

The Census Bureau's 2006–2010 American Community Survey showed that (in 2010 inflation-adjusted dollars) median household income was $45,041 (with a margin of error of +/− $9,807) and the median family income was $56,116 (+/− $10,273). Males had a median income of $60,068 (+/− $9,524) versus $35,879 (+/− $5,208) for females. The per capita income for the borough was $31,748 (+/− $5,814). About 10.6% of families and 11.5% of the population were below the poverty line, including 12.1% of those under age 18 and 8.9% of those age 65 or over.

=== 2000 census ===
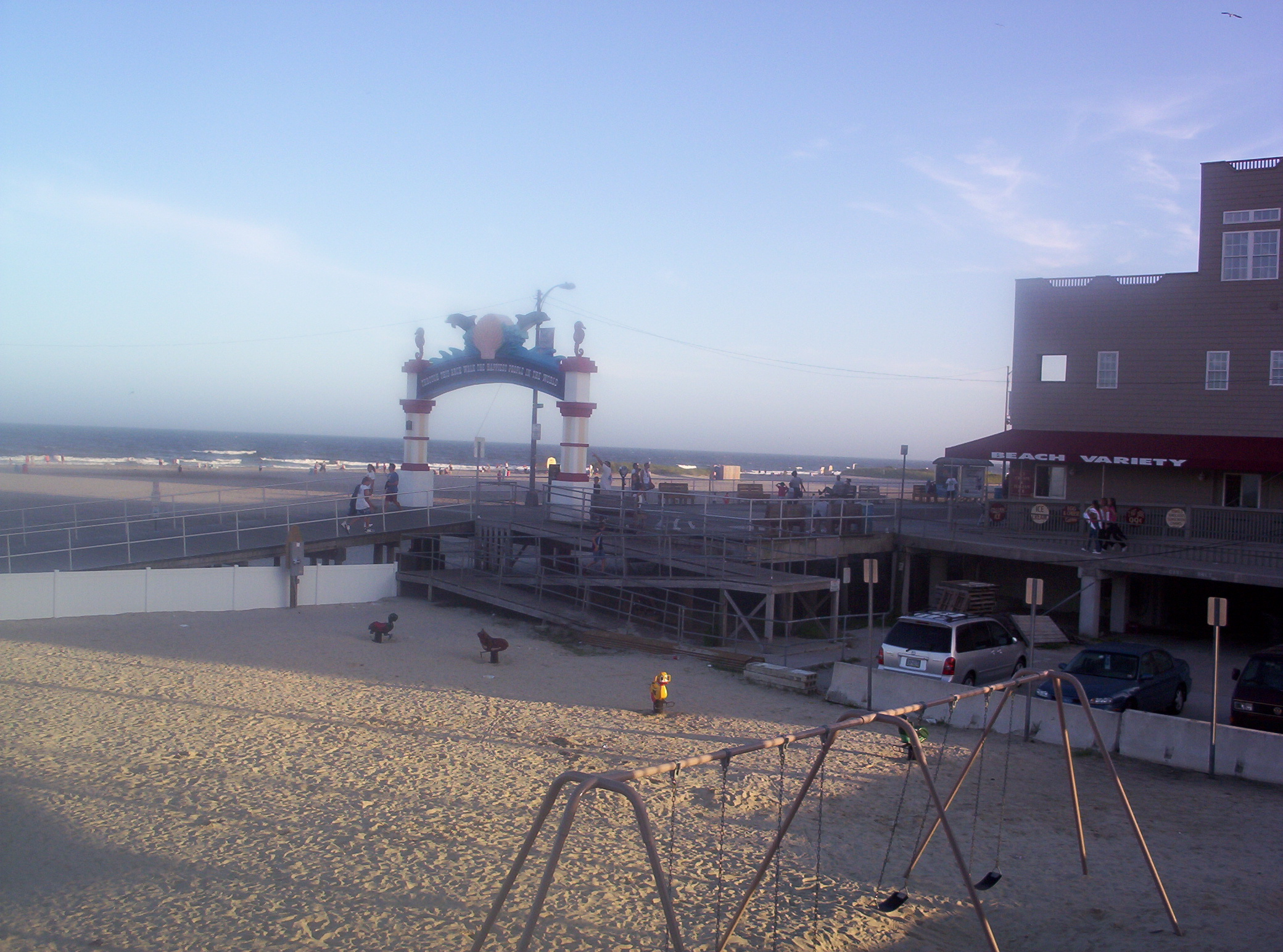
Beach entrance to the North Wildwood boardwalk

As of the 2000 U.S. census, there were 4,935 people, 2,309 households, and 1,394 families residing in the city. The population density was 2,794.6 inhabitants per square mile (1,079.0/km^{2}). There were 7,411 housing units at an average density of 4,196.7 per square mile (1,620.4/km^{2}). The racial makeup of the city was 96.62% White, 0.81% African American, 0.08% Native American, 0.57% Asian, 0.02% Pacific Islander, 0.77% from other races, and 1.13% from two or more races. Hispanic or Latino of any race were 1.95% of the population.

There were 2,309 households, out of which 18.0% had children under the age of 18 living with them, 44.3% were married couples living together, 11.9% had a female householder with no husband present, and 39.6% were non-families. 34.8% of all households were made up of individuals, and 15.6% had someone living alone who was 65 years of age or older. The average household size was 2.14 and the average family size was 2.73.

In the city, the population was spread out, with 17.2% under the age of 18, 6.0% from 18 to 24, 23.6% from 25 to 44, 29.5% from 45 to 64, and 23.7% who were 65 years of age or older. The median age was 47 years. For every 100 females, there were 92.3 males. For every 100 females aged 18 and over, there were 89.9 males.

The median income for a household in the city was $32,582, and the median income for a family was $46,250. Males had a median income of $32,986 versus $22,064 for females. The per capita income for the city was $19,656. About 9.9% of families and 11.7% of the population were below the poverty line, including 15.1% of those under age 18 and 7.5% of those age 65 or over.

== Economy ==
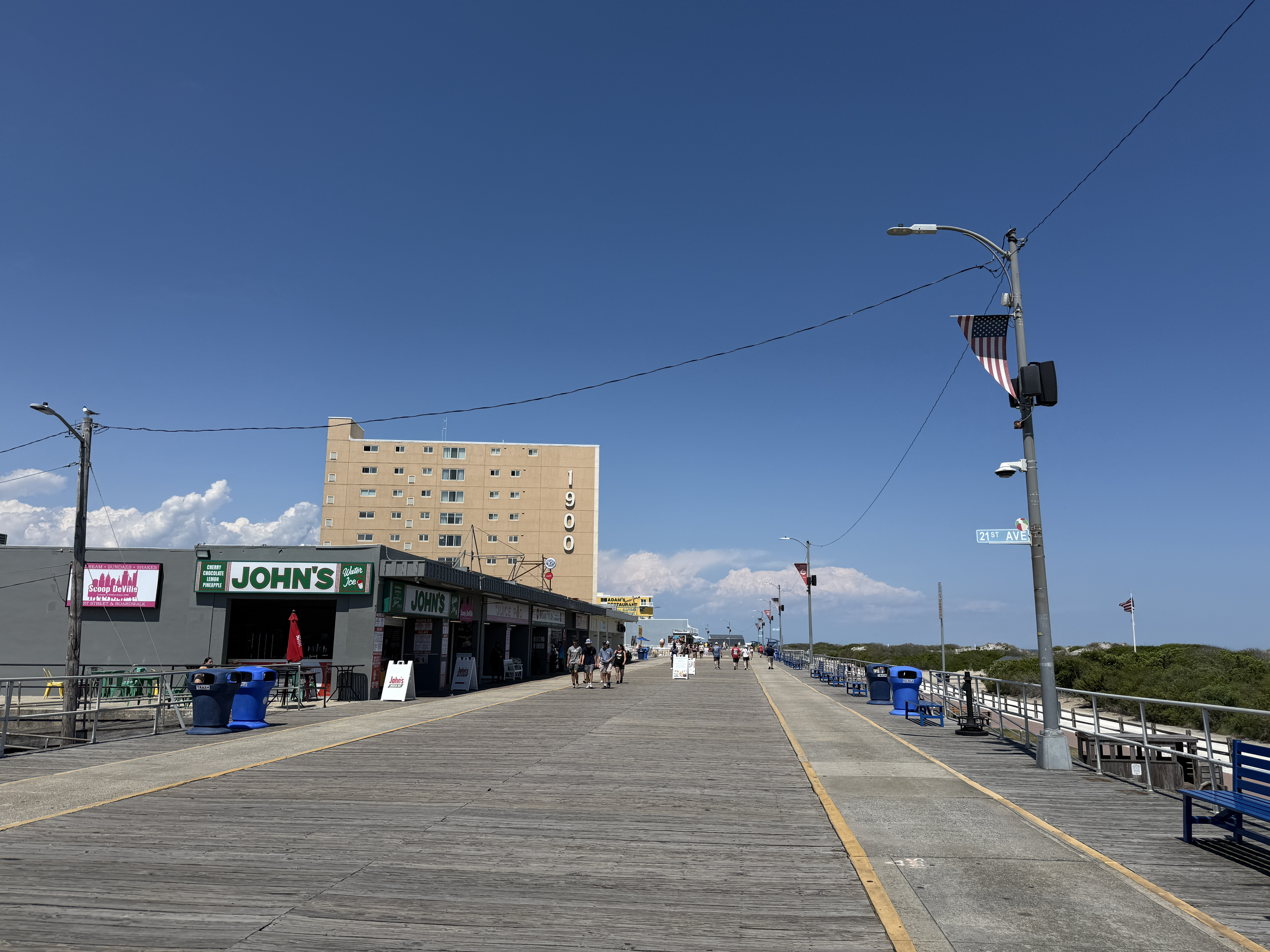
North Wildwood boardwalk

Portions of the city—together with areas in West Wildwood, Wildwood and Wildwood Crest—are part of a joint Urban Enterprise Zone (UEZ), one of 32 zones covering 37 municipalities statewide. The four municipalities in The Wildwoods were selected in 2002 as one of a group of three zones added to participate in the program as part of a joint zone with. In addition to other benefits to encourage employment and investment within the Zone, shoppers can take advantage of a reduced 3.3125% sales tax rate (half of the 6 5/8% rate charged statewide) at eligible merchants. Established in November 2002, the city's Urban Enterprise Zone status expires in December 2023. The joint UEZ is overseen by the Enterprise Zone Development Corporation of the Wildwoods Board, which includes representatives from all four municipalities.

== Government ==
=== Local government ===
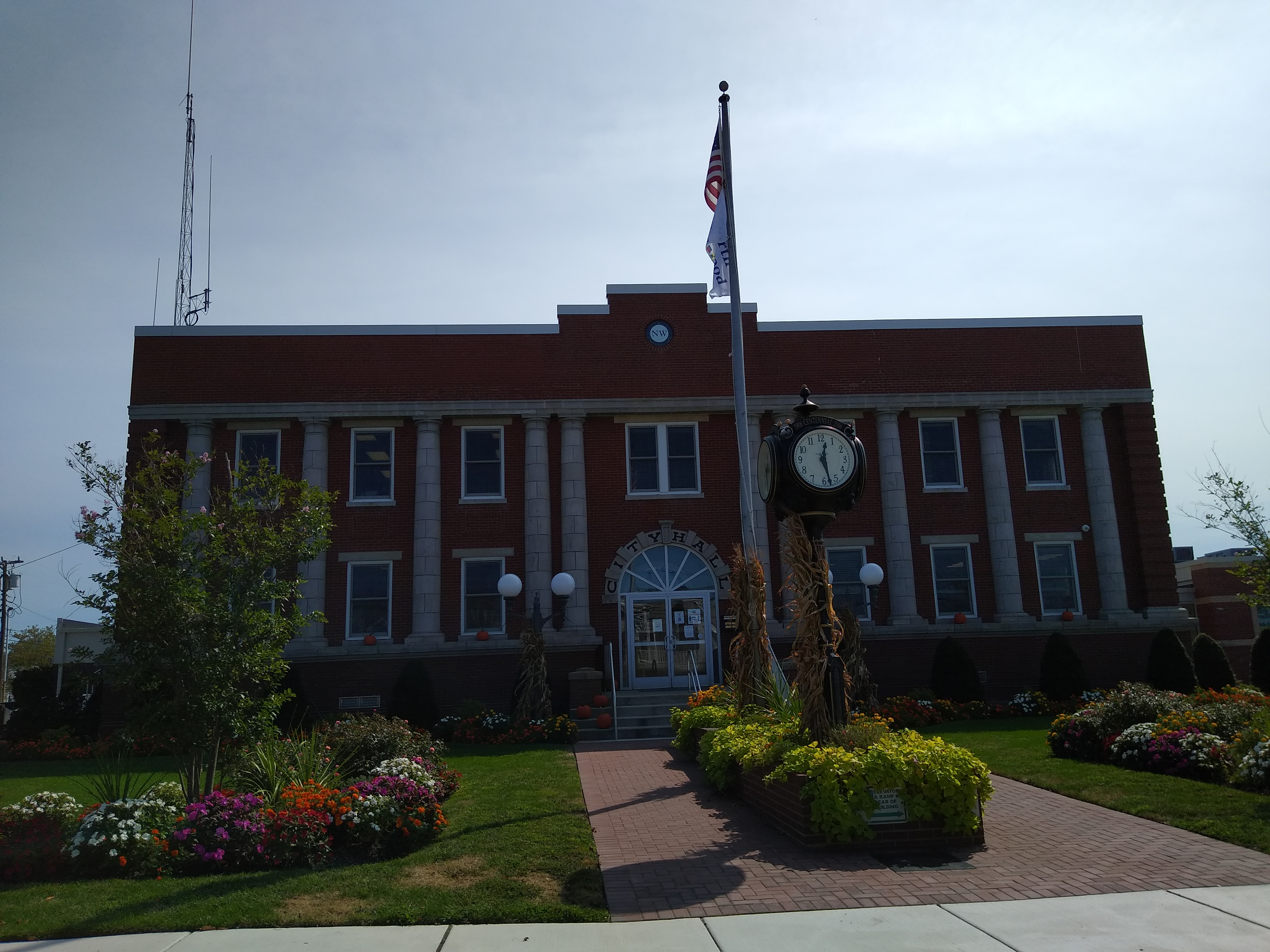
City Hall, which includes North Wildwood's police and municipal courts

North Wildwood operates under the City form of municipal government, which is used in 15 municipalities (of the 564) statewide. Under this form of government, the council functions as a legislative body: it passes ordinances and approves the appointments of the mayor. The mayor, as executive, is responsible for administrative functions and appointment of all officials. The governing body is comprised of a mayor and a city council. The mayor serves a four-year term of office. The city council includes seven members, of which six members are elected from wards for three-year terms on a staggered basis and one at-large councilmember is elected for a two-year term. Members of the governing body are selected in partisan voting as part of the November general election.

As of 2023, the mayor is Republican Patrick T. Rosenello, whose term of office ends December 31, 2025. Members of the City Council are Council President Salvatore T. Zampirri Sr. (R, 2023; at-large), Margaret Anne "Peggy" Bishop (R, 2025; 1st Ward), David J. Del Conte (R, 2023; 1st Ward), James F. Kane (R, 2024; 1st Ward), Edwin W. Koehler (R, 2025; 2nd Ward), Joseph V. Rullo (R, 2024; 2nd Ward) and Kellyann Tolomeo (R, 2023; 2nd Ward).

In January 2014, the city council chose Joseph Rullo from among three names nominated by the Republican municipal committee to fill the vacant second ward seat of Patrick Rosenello, who vacated the seat earlier that month when he took office as mayor.

==== Emergency services ====
The city is protected by the North Wildwood Police Department. In December 2025, the borough signed a deal under which the department will provide police services in West Wildwood using its existing staff and new hires as part of a ten-year deal that will have West Wildwood pay $6 million during the term of the shared-services agreement.

The city is protected by a fire department that includes career and volunteer units. The two volunteer units are Anglesea Volunteer Fire Company #1 (founded in 1897) and the North Wildwood Volunteer Fire Company #1.

=== Federal, state and county representation ===
North Wildwood is located in the 2nd Congressional District and is part of New Jersey's 1st Legislative District.

For the 119th United States Congress, New Jersey's 2nd congressional district is represented by Jeff Van Drew (R, Dennis Township). New Jersey is represented in the United States Senate by Democrats Cory Booker (Newark, term ends 2027) and Andy Kim (Moorestown, term ends 2031).

For the 2026–2027 session, the 1st legislative district of the New Jersey Legislature is represented in the State Senate by Mike Testa (R, Vineland) and in the General Assembly by Antwan McClellan (R, Ocean City) and Erik K. Simonsen (R, Lower Township).

Cape May County is governed by a five-person Board of County Commissioners whose members are elected at-large on a partisan basis to three-year terms of office on a staggered basis, with either one or two seats coming up for election each year; At an annual reorganization held each January, the commissioners select one member to serve as director and another to serve as vice-director. As of 2026, Cape May County's Commissioners are Director Leonard C. Desiderio (R, Sea Isle City, term as commissioner ends December 31, 2027; term as director ends 2026), Vice-Director Andrew Bulakowski (R, Lower Township; term as commissioner ends 2028; term as vice-director ends 2026). Robert Barr (R, Ocean City; 2028) and Will Morey (R, Wildwood Crest; 2026), with one seat expiring in December 2026 vacant after Melanie Collette resigned from office in March 2026. The county's constitutional officers are Clerk Rita Marie Rothberg (R, Ocean City; 2030), Sheriff Robert Nolan (R, Lower Township; 2026) and Surrogate E. Marie Hayes (R, Ocean City; 2028).

=== Politics ===
As of March 2011, there were a total of 3,279 registered voters in North Wildwood, of which 528 (16.1%) were registered as Democrats, 1,640 (50.0%) were registered as Republicans and 1,111 (33.9%) were registered as Unaffiliated. There were no voters registered to other parties.

Gubernatorial election results for North Wildwood
Year	Republican		Democratic		Third party(ies)	
Year	No.	%	No.	%	No.	%
2025	1,185	63.30%	683	36.49%	4	0.21%
2021	1,016	65.13%	541	34.68%	3	0.19%
2017	746	60.11%	469	37.79%	26	2.10%
2013	1,268	82.71%	248	16.18%	17	1.11%
2009	987	59.24%	563	33.79%	116	6.96%
2005	942	53.71%	743	42.36%	69	3.93%

In the 2012 presidential election, Republican Mitt Romney received 57.2% of the vote (1,209 cast), ahead of Democrat Barack Obama with 42.1% (889 votes), and other candidates with 0.8% (16 votes), among the 2,146 ballots cast by the city's 3,282 registered voters (32 ballots were spoiled), for a turnout of 65.4%. In the 2008 presidential election, Republican John McCain received 58.0% of the vote (1,415 cast), ahead of Democrat Barack Obama, who received 39.6% (967 votes), with 2,441 ballots cast among the city's 3,263 registered voters, for a turnout of 74.8%. In the 2004 presidential election, Republican George W. Bush received 56.4% of the vote (1,556 ballots cast), outpolling Democrat John Kerry, who received around 42.0% (1,158 votes), with 2,760 ballots cast among the city's 4,001 registered voters, for a turnout percentage of 69.0.

Presidential elections results
Year	Republican	Democratic
2024	63.0% 1,414	35.2% 791
2020	62.1% 1,446	37.0% 861
2016	64.2% 1,331	32.4% 661
2012	57.2% 1,209	42.1% 889
2008	58.0% 1,415	39.6% 967
2004	56.4% 1,556	42.0% 1,158

In the 2013 gubernatorial election, Republican Chris Christie received 82.7% of the vote (1,268 cast), ahead of Democrat Barbara Buono with 16.2% (248 votes), and other candidates with 1.1% (17 votes), among the 1,596 ballots cast by the city's 3,173 registered voters (63 ballots were spoiled), for a turnout of 50.3%. In the 2009 gubernatorial election, Republican Chris Christie received 57.7% of the vote (987 ballots cast), ahead of both Democrat Jon Corzine with 32.9% (563 votes) and Independent Chris Daggett with 5.7% (98 votes), with 1,711 ballots cast among the city's 3,336 registered voters, yielding a 51.3% turnout.

United States Senate election results for North Wildwood1
Year	Republican		Democratic		Third party(ies)	
Year	No.	%	No.	%	No.	%
2024	1,372	64.44%	741	34.81%	16	0.75%
2018	1,075	67.27%	490	30.66%	33	2.07%
2012	1,095	57.42%	785	41.16%	27	1.42%
2006	1,166	62.22%	671	35.81%	37	1.97%

United States Senate election results for North Wildwood2
Year	Republican		Democratic		Third party(ies)	
Year	No.	%	No.	%	No.	%
2020	1,325	60.39%	834	38.01%	35	1.60%
2014	799	67.31%	376	31.68%	12	1.01%
2013	589	68.57%	267	31.08%	3	0.35%
2008	1,171	54.80%	922	43.14%	44	2.06%

== Education ==
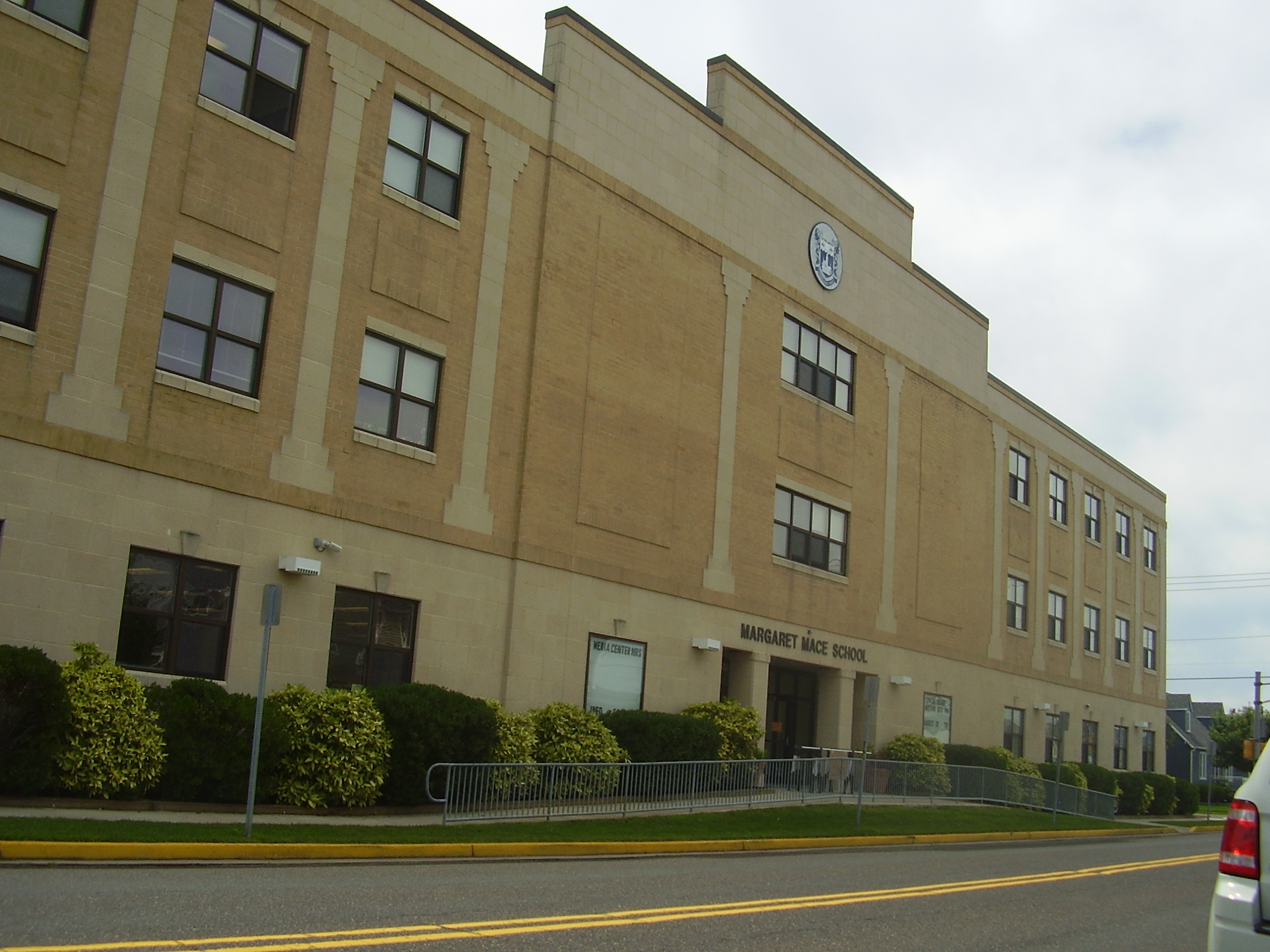
Margaret Mace School

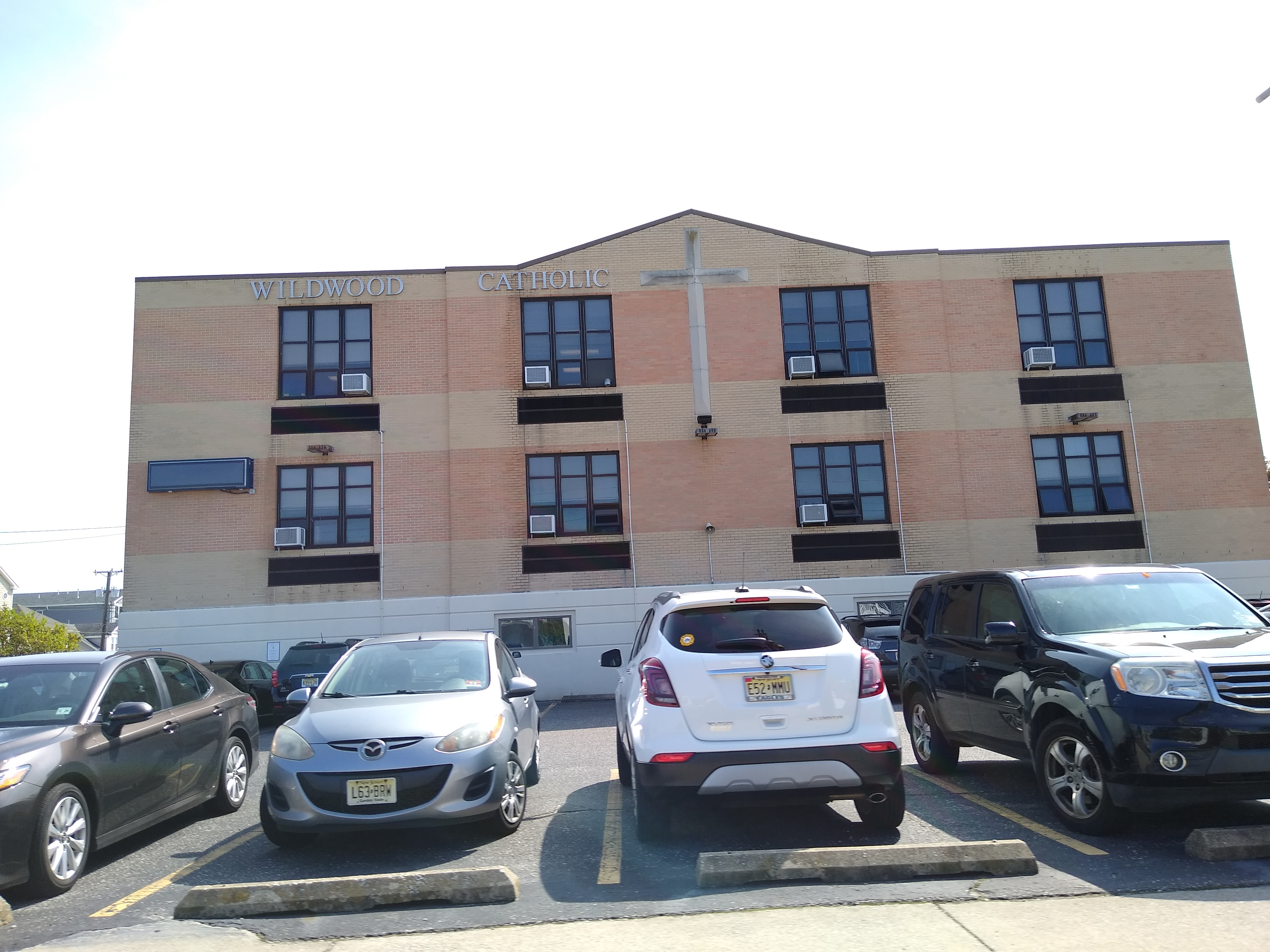
Wildwood Catholic Academy

The North Wildwood School District serves students in public school for pre-kindergarten through eighth grade at Margaret Mace School. The district also serves students from West Wildwood, which has a non-operating district that sends students to North Wildwood District in a sending/receiving relationship. As of the 2024–25 school year, the district, comprised of one school, had an enrollment of 164 students and 29.0 classroom teachers (on an FTE basis), for a student–teacher ratio of 5.7:1.

For ninth through twelfth grades, public school students from North Wildwood attend Wildwood High School in Wildwood as part of a sending/receiving relationship with the Wildwood City School District, together with students from West Wildwood and Wildwood Crest. As of the 2024–25 school year, the high school had an enrollment of 261 students and 26.4 classroom teachers (on an FTE basis), for a student–teacher ratio of 9.9:1.

Students are also eligible to attend Cape May County Technical High School in the Cape May Court House area, which serves students from the entire county in its comprehensive and vocational programs, which are offered without charge to students who are county residents. Special needs students may be referred to Cape May County Special Services School District in the Cape May Court House area.

Wildwood Catholic Academy (Pre-K–12) operates under the auspices of the Roman Catholic Diocese of Camden. There was previously a Catholic elementary school in Wildwood, St. Ann's School, which operated until 2010, when it merged into Cape Trinity Regional School (Pre-K–8) in North Wildwood. Upon its creation Cape Trinity Catholic Regional School operated separately from Wildwood Catholic High School but shared a common building. In April 2020, the Diocese of Camden announced that both of its Wildwood schools would permanently close at the end of the school year due to declining enrollment, which had dropped by 12% over the previous five years. By June 2020, both schools avoided closure after agreeing to merge.

== Arts and culture ==
The Irish Fall Festival is the largest on the East Coast.

== Transportation ==
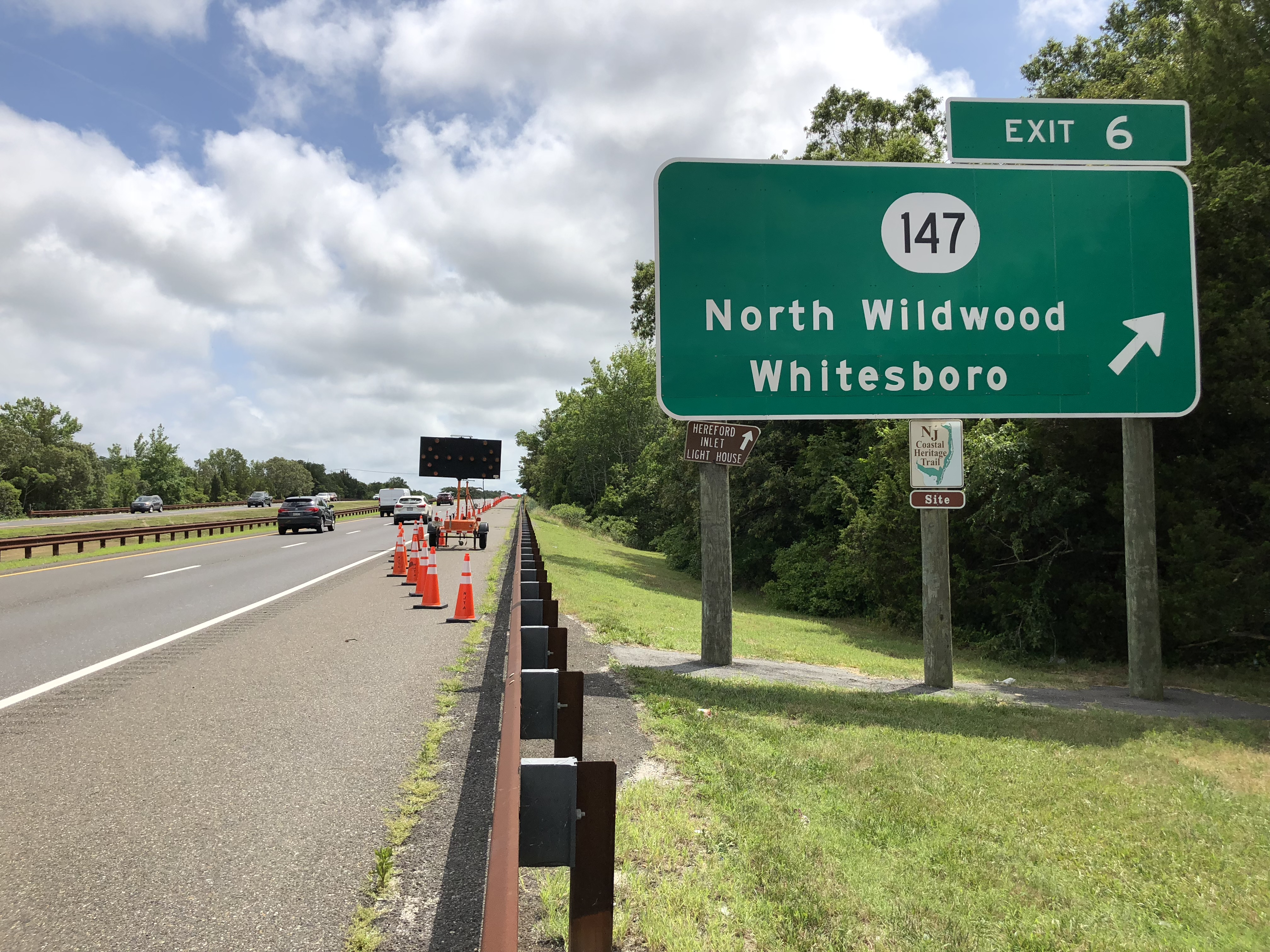
The Garden State Parkway at Exit 6 in North Wildwood

=== Roads and highways ===
As of May 2010, the city had a total of 35.57 miles (57.24 km) of roadways, of which 33.19 miles (53.41 km) were maintained by the municipality, 1.42 miles (2.29 km) by Cape May County and 0.96 miles (1.54 km) by the New Jersey Department of Transportation.

Route 147 has its eastern terminus in North Wildwood and heads west to provide access to the Garden State Parkway northbound. County Route 621 (New Jersey Avenue) begins at the eastern terminus of Route 147 and heads southwest through the city toward Wildwood and Wildwood Crest, serving as part of Ocean Drive.

Parking in the beach area and Entertainment District of North Wildwood is regulated by parking meters between May 15 and September 30, whichever comes first. Yearly and weekly parking meter permits are also available.

=== Public transportation ===
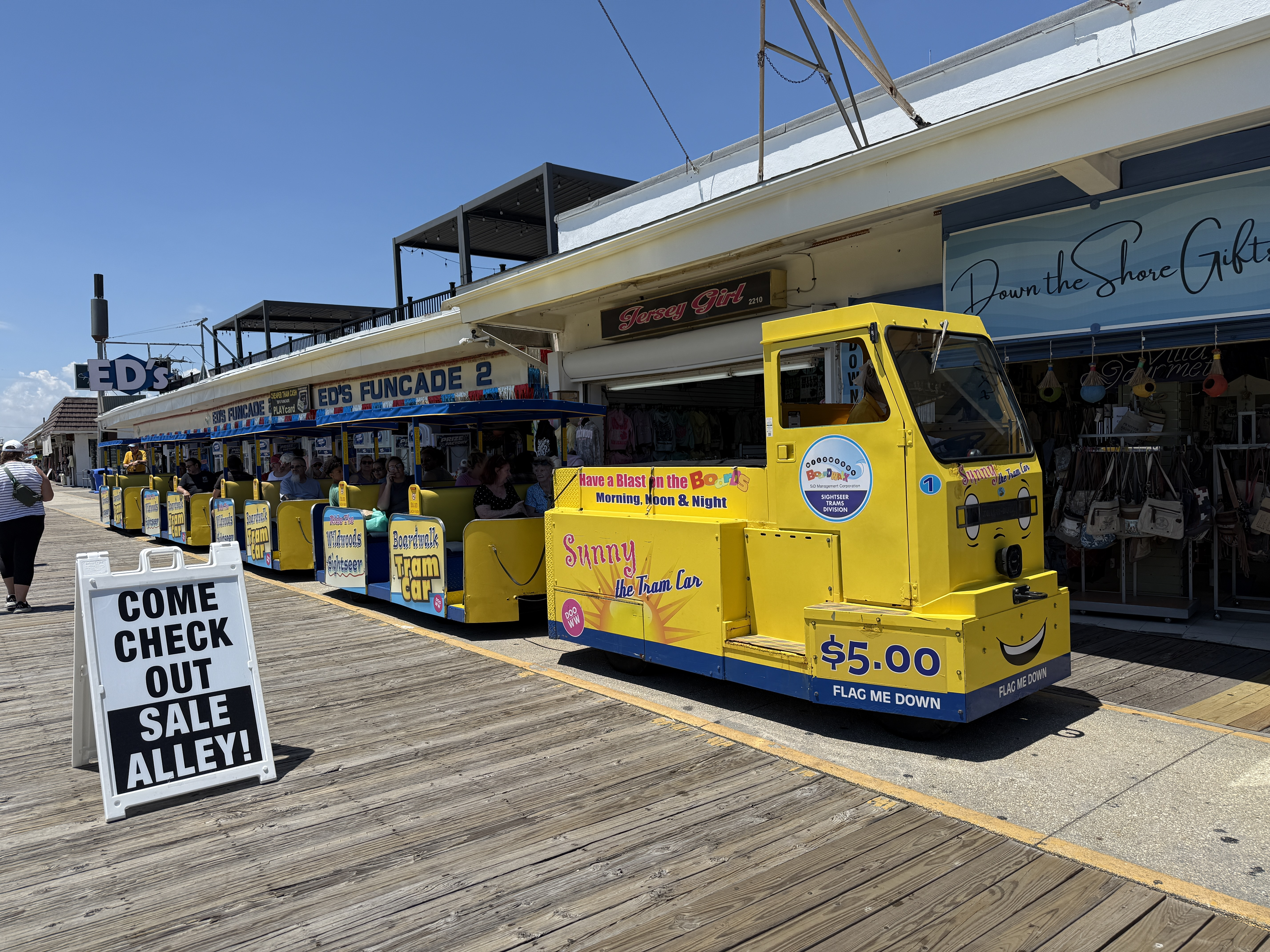
Tramcar on North Wildwood boardwalk

NJ Transit provides bus service in the borough on the 313/315 routes between Cape May and Philadelphia (with seasonal service on the 316 route), on the 319 route to the Port Authority Bus Terminal in Midtown Manhattan and on the 552 route between Cape May and Atlantic City.

The Great American Trolley Company operates trolley service in North Wildwood during the summer months. The company runs a trolley route that provides service from North Wildwood to the boardwalk at Schellenger Avenue in Wildwood on Friday and Saturday evenings. Another trolley route runs from North Wildwood to shopping centers in Rio Grande, operating Mondays through Fridays. The Great American Trolley Company also runs two trolley routes to the Irish Fall Festival in North Wildwood during the weekend of the festival, with one route connecting Wildwood Crest and Wildwood to the festival site and the other route connecting points in North Wildwood to the festival site.

The Tramcar is a trackless train service running along the entire length of the Wildwoods boardwalk from Cresse Avenue in Wildwood to 16th Avenue in North Wildwood during the summer season.

== Climate ==
According to the Köppen climate classification system, North Wildwood has a humid subtropical climate (Cfa) with hot, moderately humid summers, cool winters and year-around precipitation. Cfa climates are characterized by all months having an average mean temperature above 32.0 °F (0.0 °C), at least four months with an average mean temperature at or above 50.0 °F (10.0 °C), at least one month with an average mean temperature at or above 71.6 °F (22.0 °C) and no significant precipitation difference between seasons. During the summer months in North Wildwood, a cooling afternoon sea breeze is present on most days, but episodes of extreme heat and humidity can occur with heat index values at or above 95.0 °F (35.0 °C). During the winter months, episodes of extreme cold and wind can occur with wind chill values below 0.0 °F (−17.8 °C). The plant hardiness zone at North Wildwood Beach is 7b with an average annual extreme minimum air temperature of 6.3 °F (−14.3 °C). The average seasonal (November–April) snowfall total is 12 to 18 inches (300 to 460 mm), and the average snowiest month is February which corresponds with the annual peak in nor'easter activity.

Climate data for North Wildwood Beach, NJ (1981–2010 Averages)
Month	Jan	Feb	Mar	Apr	May	Jun	Jul	Aug	Sep	Oct	Nov	Dec	Year
Mean daily maximum °F (°C)	42.0 (5.6)	43.8 (6.6)	50.5 (10.3)	59.6 (15.3)	68.9 (20.5)	78.1 (25.6)	83.1 (28.4)	81.8 (27.7)	76.3 (24.6)	66.2 (19.0)	56.2 (13.4)	46.7 (8.2)	62.9 (17.2)
Daily mean °F (°C)	34.9 (1.6)	36.6 (2.6)	43.0 (6.1)	52.1 (11.2)	61.4 (16.3)	70.8 (21.6)	76.0 (24.4)	74.8 (23.8)	68.8 (20.4)	58.2 (14.6)	48.6 (9.2)	39.4 (4.1)	55.5 (13.1)
Mean daily minimum °F (°C)	27.7 (−2.4)	29.4 (−1.4)	35.4 (1.9)	44.7 (7.1)	53.8 (12.1)	63.5 (17.5)	68.9 (20.5)	67.9 (19.9)	61.3 (16.3)	50.1 (10.1)	41.1 (5.1)	32.2 (0.1)	48.1 (8.9)
Average precipitation inches (mm)	3.36 (85)	2.83 (72)	4.17 (106)	3.63 (92)	3.58 (91)	3.20 (81)	3.80 (97)	4.15 (105)	3.34 (85)	3.60 (91)	3.27 (83)	3.64 (92)	42.57 (1,081)
Average relative humidity (%)	66.6	65.7	63.6	62.5	66.9	71.2	70.2	73.1	70.0	68.8	68.0	67.1	67.8
Average dew point °F (°C)	24.9 (−3.9)	26.2 (−3.2)	31.5 (−0.3)	39.7 (4.3)	50.3 (10.2)	61.0 (16.1)	65.6 (18.7)	65.6 (18.7)	58.6 (14.8)	48.0 (8.9)	38.5 (3.6)	29.4 (−1.4)	45.0 (7.2)
Source: PRISM

Climate data for North Cape May, NJ Ocean Water Temperature (9 W North Wildwood)
Month	Jan	Feb	Mar	Apr	May	Jun	Jul	Aug	Sep	Oct	Nov	Dec	Year
Daily mean °F (°C)	37 (3)	37 (3)	42 (6)	50 (10)	59 (15)	68 (20)	73 (23)	74 (23)	72 (22)	61 (16)	52 (11)	42 (6)	56 (13)
Source: NOAA

== Ecology ==
According to the A. W. Kuchler U.S. potential natural vegetation types, North Wildwood would have a dominant vegetation type of Northern Cordgrass (73) with a dominant vegetation form of Coastal Prairie (20).

== Religion ==
Notre Dame de la Mer Catholic Parish, which has its administrative offices at Wildwood Catholic Academy, is of the Roman Catholic Diocese of Camden. The worship sites are in Wildwood and Wildwood Crest. In 2008, the diocese announced that it would merge two standalone parish churches in those cities into one parish, and the merger occurred in 2010.

== Notable people ==
People who were born in, residents of, or otherwise closely associated with North Wildwood include:

- Patricia Blair (1933–2013), television and film actress
- Anthony Cafiero (1900–1982), politician who served in the New Jersey Senate from 1949 to 1953
- James Cafiero (1928–2023), politician who served in the New Jersey General Assembly from 1968 to 1972 and in the State Senate from 1972 to 1982 and again from 1990 to 2004
- Justin Catanoso (born 1959), journalist and author of My Cousin The Saint, A Search for Faith, Family, and Miracles
- Greg Fulginiti (born 1951), recording and mastering engineer
- Joseph Anthony Galante (1938–2019), former bishop of the Roman Catholic Diocese of Camden
- Cozy Morley (c. 1926–2013), singer-songwriter, entertainer, comedian and owner of Club Avalon in North Wildwood, best known for his rendition of "On the Way to Cape May"
- George A. Redding (1880–1960), politician who served as Cape May County Sheriff, mayor of North Wildwood and represented Cape May County in the New Jersey Senate

Preceded by Stone Harbor	Beaches of New Jersey	Succeeded by Wildwood
