= West Wildwood, New Jersey =

Borough in Cape May County, New Jersey, US

- Borough
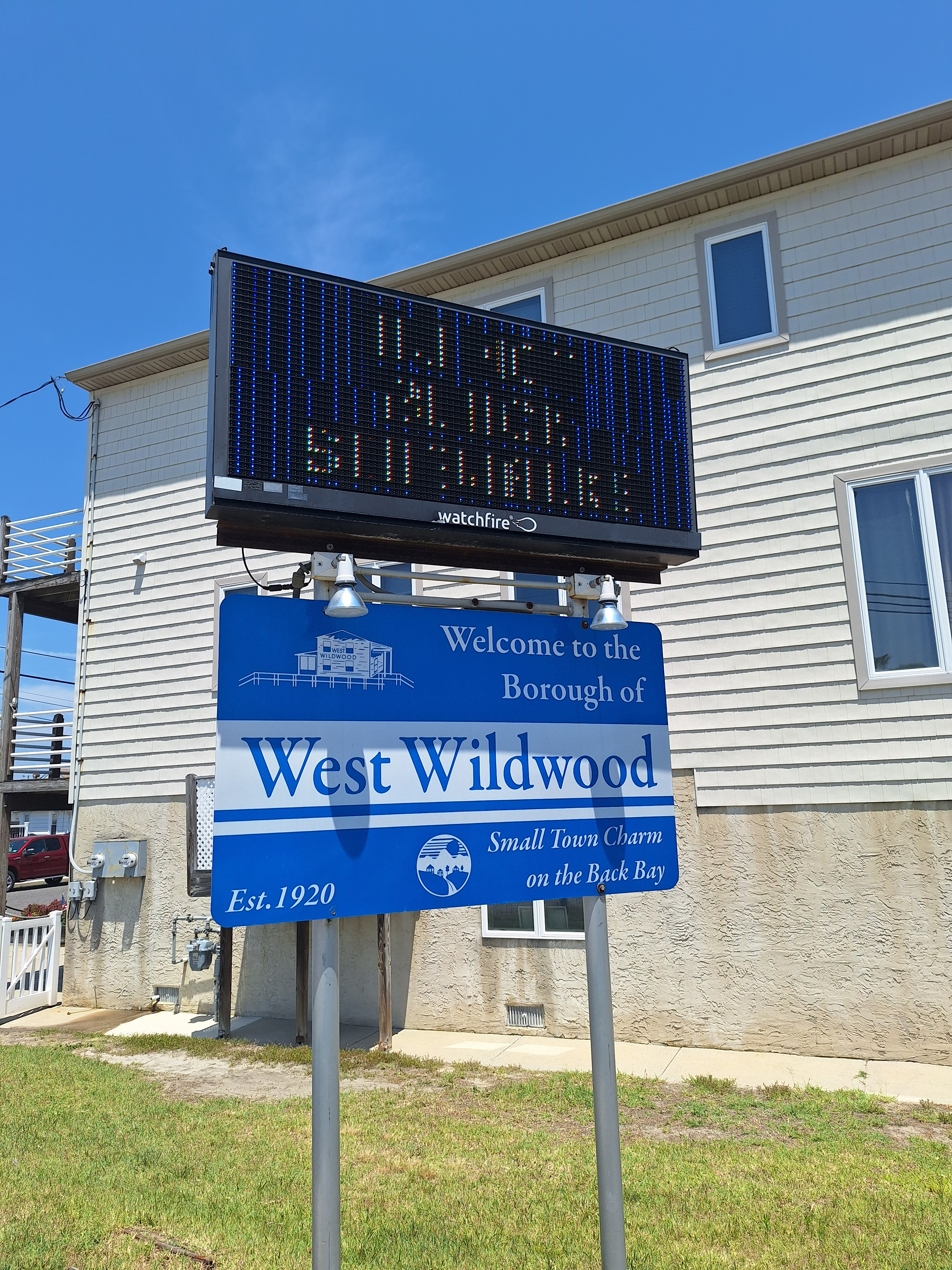
- Entrance sign

- Seal
- Motto: Small Town Charm on the Back Bay
- Location of West Wildwood in Cape May County highlighted in red (left). Inset map: Location of Cape May County in New Jersey highlighted in orange (right).

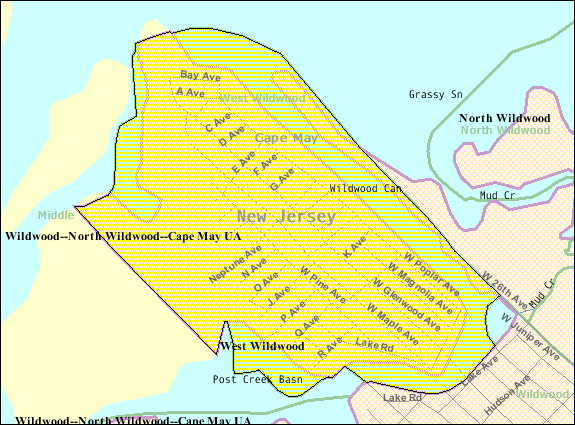
- Census Bureau map of West Wildwood, New Jersey

- Location in Cape May County Location in New Jersey Location in the United States
- Coordinates: 39.000598°N 74.823573°W
- Country: United States
- State: New Jersey
- County: Cape May
- Incorporated: April 21, 1920

Government
  - Type: Walsh Act
  - Body: Board of Commissioners
  - Mayor: Matthew J. Ksiazek (term ends December 31, 2028)
  - Municipal clerk: Donna L. Frederick

Area
  - Total: 0.36 sq mi (0.94 km^{2})
  - Land: 0.29 sq mi (0.74 km^{2})
  - Water: 0.077 sq mi (0.20 km^{2}) 21.67%
  - Rank: 551st of 565 in state 15th of 16 in county
- Elevation: 0 ft (0 m)

Population (2020)
  - Total: 540
  - Estimate (2023): 542
  - Rank: 550th of 565 in state 15th of 16 in county
  - Density: 1,887.7/sq mi (728.8/km^{2})
  - Rank: 301st of 565 in state 4th of 16 in county
- Time zone: UTC−05:00 (Eastern (EST))
  - Summer (DST): UTC−04:00 (Eastern (EDT))
- ZIP Code: 08260
- Area code: 609
- FIPS code: 3400980210
- GNIS feature ID: 0885441
- Website: www.westwildwood.org

West Wildwood is a borough in Cape May County, in the U.S. state of New Jersey. The borough, and all of Cape May County, is part of the Ocean City metropolitan statistical area, and is part of the Philadelphia metropolitan area. As of the 2020 United States census, the borough's population was 540, a decrease of 63 (−10.4%) from the 2010 census count of 603, which in turn reflected an increase of 155 (+34.6%) from the 448 counted in the 2000 census. The summer population grows to as much as 5,000.

West Wildwood was incorporated as a borough by an act of the New Jersey Legislature on April 21, 1920, from portions of Middle Township.

== Geography ==
According to the United States Census Bureau, the borough had a total area of 0.36 square miles (0.94 km^{2}), including 0.29 square miles (0.74 km^{2}) of land and 0.08 square miles (0.20 km^{2}) of water (21.67%).

The borough borders the Cape May County municipalities of Middle Township, North Wildwood and Wildwood.

Located on a small island connected to Wildwood by a two-lane bridge, the borough consists primarily vacation and year-round homes with a single night club, a miniature golf course and several marinas. Created using landfill to cover existing marshes in the 1920s, the borough is surrounded by bulkheads to protect it from flooding, though heavy winds and high tides can overtop the flood protection mechanisms.

== Demographics ==
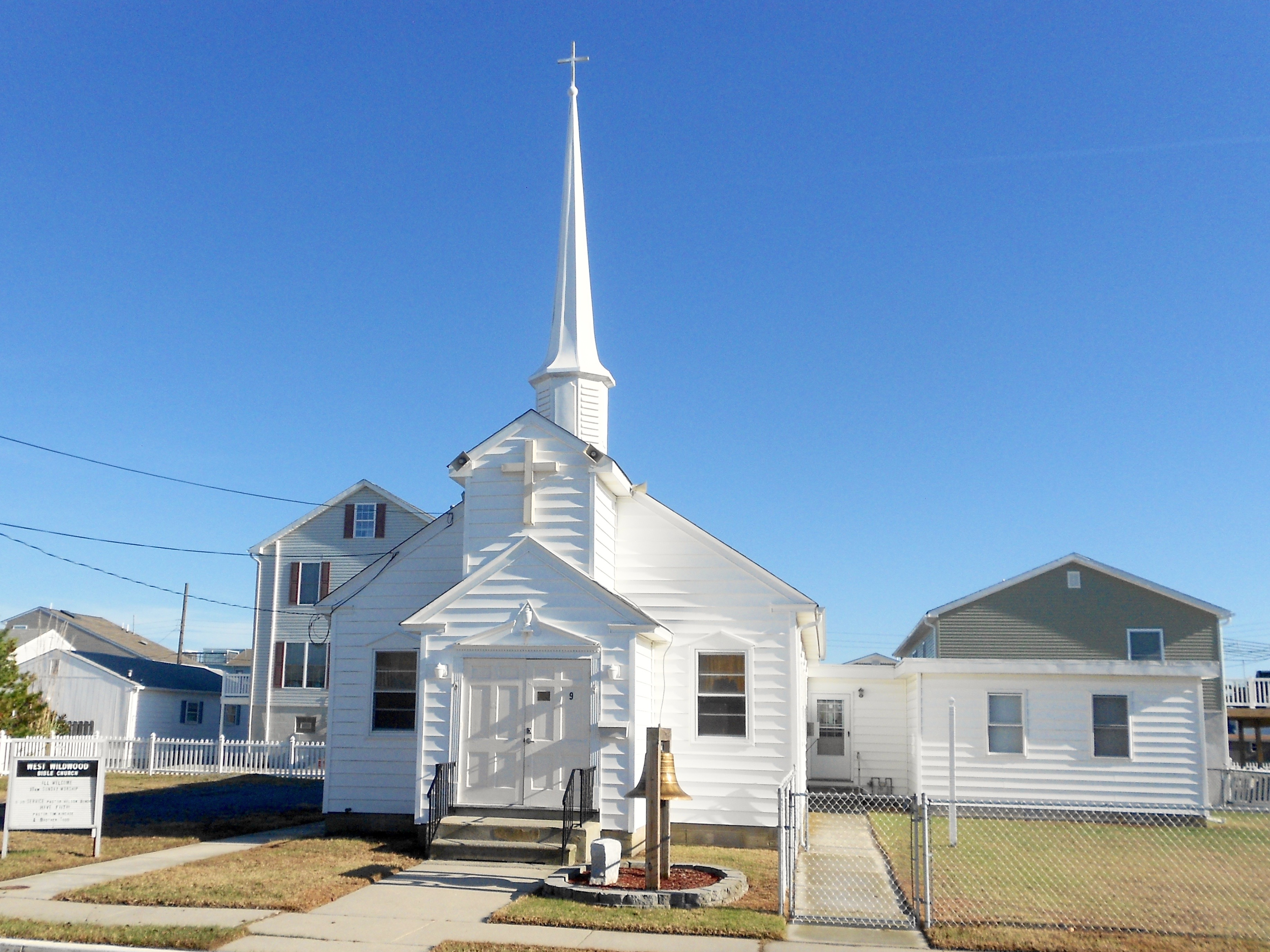
West Wildwood Bible Church

Historical population
Census	Pop.	Note	%±
1930	178		—
1940	146		−18.0%
1950	237		62.3%
1960	207		−12.7%
1970	235		13.5%
1980	360		53.2%
1990	453		25.8%
2000	448		−1.1%
2010	603		34.6%
2020	540		−10.4%
2023 (est.)	542	▲	0.4%
Population sources: 1930–2000 1930; 1940–2000 2000; 2010 2020

=== 2010 census ===
The 2010 United States census counted 603 people, 276 households, and 160 families in the borough. The population density was 2,188.4 per square mile (844.9/km^{2}). There were 893 housing units at an average density of 3,240.9 per square mile (1,251.3/km^{2}). The racial makeup was 95.36% (575) White, 1.49% (9) Black or African American, 0.00% (0) Native American, 0.00% (0) Asian, 0.00% (0) Pacific Islander, 0.66% (4) from other races, and 2.49% (15) from two or more races. Hispanic or Latino of any race were 2.65% (16) of the population.

Of the 276 households, 14.5% had children under the age of 18; 42.8% were married couples living together; 9.1% had a female householder with no husband present and 42.0% were non-families. Of all households, 35.9% were made up of individuals and 17.4% had someone living alone who was 65 years of age or older. The average household size was 2.14 and the average family size was 2.78.

17.4% of the population were under the age of 18, 5.5% from 18 to 24, 16.3% from 25 to 44, 33.2% from 45 to 64, and 27.7% who were 65 years of age or older. The median age was 52.8 years. For every 100 females, the population had 97.1 males. For every 100 females ages 18 and older there were 99.2 males.

The Census Bureau's 2006–2010 American Community Survey showed that (in 2010 inflation-adjusted dollars) median household income was $38,750 (with a margin of error of +/− $10,914) and the median family income was $57,981 (+/− $16,263). Males had a median income of $36,607 (+/− $10,003) versus $36,364 (+/− $10,046) for females. The per capita income for the borough was $27,606 (+/− $4,119). About 6.7% of families and 8.9% of the population were below the poverty line, including 7.5% of those under age 18 and 6.5% of those age 65 or over.

=== 2000 census ===
As of the 2000 United States census there were 448 people, 202 households, and 117 families residing in the borough. The population density was 1,698.0 inhabitants per square mile (655.6/km^{2}). There were 775 housing units at an average density of 1, 150.9/km^{2} (2,937.4/sq mi). The racial makeup of the borough was 95.76% White, 0.22% Asian, 2.23% from other races, and 1.79% from two or more races. Hispanic or Latino of any race were 3.79% of the population.

There were 202 households, out of which 20.8% had children under the age of 18 living with them, 46.0% were married couples living together, 9.4% had a female householder with no husband present, and 41.6% were non-families. 36.6% of all households were made up of individuals, and 17.3% had someone living alone who was 65 years of age or older. The average household size was 2.22 and the average family size was 2.92.

In the borough the population was spread out, with 18.8% under the age of 18, 5.4% from 18 to 24, 23.7% from 25 to 44, 32.8% from 45 to 64, and 19.4% who were 65 years of age or older. The median age was 47 years. For every 100 females, there were 93.9 males. For every 100 females age 18 and over, there were 88.6 males.

The median income for a household in the borough was $33,393, and the median income for a family was $50,625. Males had a median income of $38,281 versus $21,190 for females. The per capita income for the borough was $17,839. About 3.2% of families and 6.5% of the population were below the poverty line, including 13.4% of those under age 18 and 5.6% of those age 65 or over.

== Economy ==
Portions of the borough—together with areas in North Wildwood, Wildwood and Wildwood Crest—are part of a joint Urban Enterprise Zone (UEZ), one of 32 zones covering 37 municipalities statewide. The four municipalities in The Wildwoods were selected in 2002 as one of a group of three zones added to participate in the program. In addition to other benefits to encourage employment and investment within the Zone, shoppers can take advantage of a reduced 3.3125% sales tax rate (half of the 6 5/8% rate charged statewide) at eligible merchants. Established in November 2002, the borough's Urban Enterprise Zone status expires in December 2023. The joint UEZ is overseen by the Enterprise Zone Development Corporation of the Wildwoods Board, which includes representatives from all four municipalities.

== Government ==
=== Local government ===
West Wildwood has been governed under the Walsh Act form of New Jersey municipal government since 1964. The borough is one of 71 municipalities (of the 564) statewide that use the commission form of government. The governing body is comprised of three commissioners, who are elected at-large on a non-partisan basis to serve concurrent four-year terms of office as part of the November general election. At a reorganization meeting conducted after each election, the commission selects one of its members to serve as mayor and designates for each commissioner an assigned department to oversee.

As of 2023, members of the West Wildwood Borough Board of Commissioners are Mayor Matthew J. Ksiazek (Commissioner of Public Works, Parks and Public Property), John J. Banning (Commissioner of Public Safety and Public Affairs), Joseph D. Segrest (Commissioner of Revenue and Finance), all serving concurrent terms of office ending December 31, 2024.

In June 2019, Cornelius J. Maxwell (who had been serving as Commissioner of Revenue and Finance) resigned from office, citing personal reasons. The meeting where Maxwell resigned was the first following the disclosure of ethics fines of nearly $25,000—the largest in state history by the board—that had been assessed by the Local Finance Board against Mayor Fox relating to his actions on behalf of Police Chief Jacqueline Ferentz. In November 2019, Amy Korbellis was elected to fill the vacant seat.

In the same May 2012 election in which the three incumbent commissioners were elected, the voters approved a ballot question shifting elections from May to November, extending the terms of the three elected commissioners by an additional six months, with the next municipal election taking place in November 2016.

In December 2025, the borough signed a deal under which neighboring North Wildwood will provide police services in West Wildwood using its existing staff and new hires as part of a ten-year deal that will have West Wildwood pay $6 million during the term of the shared-services agreement.

=== Federal, state and county representation ===
West Wildwood is located in the 2nd Congressional District and is part of New Jersey's 1st state legislative district.

For the 119th United States Congress, New Jersey's 2nd congressional district is represented by Jeff Van Drew (R, Dennis Township). New Jersey is represented in the United States Senate by Democrats Cory Booker (Newark, term ends 2027) and Andy Kim (Moorestown, term ends 2031).

For the 2026–2027 session, the 1st legislative district of the New Jersey Legislature is represented in the State Senate by Mike Testa (R, Vineland) and in the General Assembly by Antwan McClellan (R, Ocean City) and Erik K. Simonsen (R, Lower Township).

Cape May County is governed by a five-person Board of County Commissioners whose members are elected at-large on a partisan basis to three-year terms of office on a staggered basis, with either one or two seats coming up for election each year; At an annual reorganization held each January, the commissioners select one member to serve as director and another to serve as vice-director. As of 2026, Cape May County's Commissioners are Director Leonard C. Desiderio (R, Sea Isle City, term as commissioner ends December 31, 2027; term as director ends 2026), Vice-Director Andrew Bulakowski (R, Lower Township; term as commissioner ends 2028; term as vice-director ends 2026). Robert Barr (R, Ocean City; 2028) and Will Morey (R, Wildwood Crest; 2026), with one seat expiring in December 2026 vacant after Melanie Collette resigned from office in March 2026. The county's constitutional officers are Clerk Rita Marie Rothberg (R, Ocean City; 2030), Sheriff Robert Nolan (R, Lower Township; 2026) and Surrogate E. Marie Hayes (R, Ocean City; 2028).

=== Politics ===
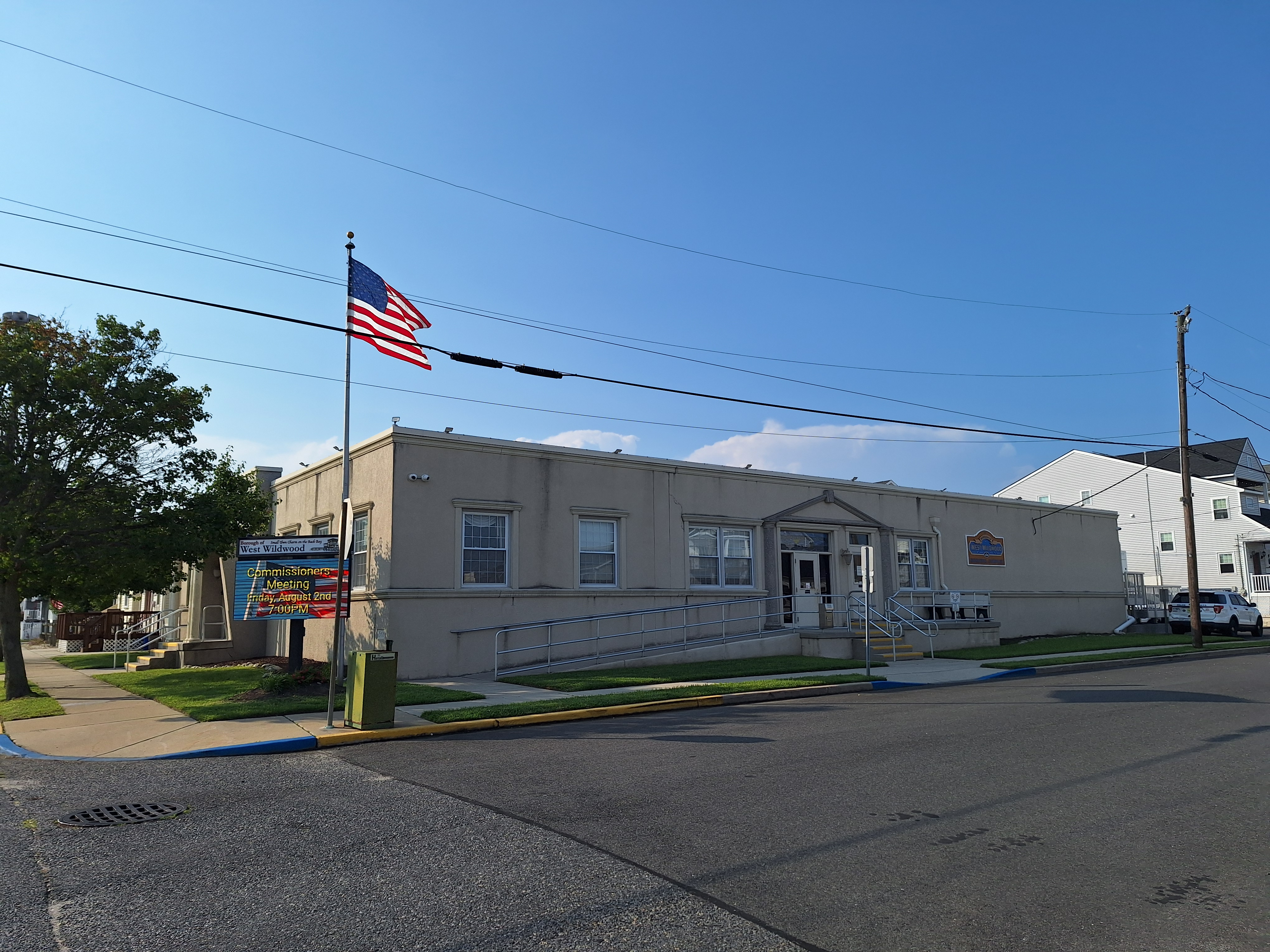
Borough Hall

As of March 2011, there were a total of 463 registered voters in West Wildwood, of which 124 (26.8%) were registered as Democrats, 184 (39.7%) were registered as Republicans and 154 (33.3%) were registered as Unaffiliated. There was one voter registered to another party.

Gubernatorial election results for West Wildwood
Year	Republican		Democratic		Third party(ies)	
Year	No.	%	No.	%	No.	%
2025	211	67.63%	101	32.37%	0	0.00%
2021	158	62.20%	93	36.61%	3	1.18%
2017	116	59.79%	77	39.69%	1	0.52%
2013	175	75.43%	54	23.28%	3	1.29%
2009	148	49.50%	128	42.81%	23	7.69%
2005	112	50.45%	102	45.95%	8	3.60%

In the 2012 presidential election, Democrat Barack Obama received 51.6% of the vote (165 cast), ahead of Republican Mitt Romney with 48.1% (154 votes), and other candidates with 0.3% (1 vote), among the 323 ballots cast by the borough's 459 registered voters (3 ballots were spoiled), for a turnout of 70.4%. In the 2008 presidential election, Republican John McCain received 52.4% of the vote (177 cast), ahead of Democrat Barack Obama, who received 45.0% (152 votes), with 338 ballots cast among the borough's 462 registered voters, for a turnout of 73.2%. In the 2004 presidential election, Democrat John Kerry received 51.4% of the vote (171 ballots cast), outpolling Republican George W. Bush, who received 47.1% (157 votes), with 333 ballots cast among the borough's 422 registered voters, for a turnout percentage of 78.9.

Presidential elections results
Year	Republican	Democratic
2024	65.7% 253	33.3% 128
2020	62.6% 228	36.3% 132
2016	60.9% 181	36.0% 107
2012	48.1% 154	51.6% 165
2008	52.4% 177	45.0% 152
2004	47.1% 157	51.4% 174

In the 2013 gubernatorial election, Republican Chris Christie received 75.4% of the vote (175 cast), ahead of Democrat Barbara Buono with 23.3% (54 votes), and other candidates with 1.3% (3 votes), among the 236 ballots cast by the borough's 435 registered voters (4 ballots were spoiled), for a turnout of 54.3%. In the 2009 gubernatorial election, Republican Chris Christie received 48.2% of the vote (148 ballots cast), ahead of both Democrat Jon Corzine with 41.7% (128 votes) and Independent Chris Daggett with 4.9% (15 votes), with 307 ballots cast among the borough's 493 registered voters, yielding a 62.3% turnout.

United States Senate election results for West Wildwood1
Year	Republican		Democratic		Third party(ies)	
Year	No.	%	No.	%	No.	%
2024	235	64.21%	125	34.15%	6	1.64%
2018	157	64.61%	74	30.45%	12	4.94%
2012	138	48.08%	148	51.57%	1	0.35%
2006	112	54.63%	88	42.93%	5	2.44%

United States Senate election results for West Wildwood2
Year	Republican		Democratic		Third party(ies)	
Year	No.	%	No.	%	No.	%
2020	194	58.61%	132	39.88%	5	1.51%
2014	130	52.85%	108	43.90%	8	3.25%
2013	77	50.66%	69	45.39%	6	3.95%
2008	139	49.64%	132	47.14%	9	3.21%

== Education ==
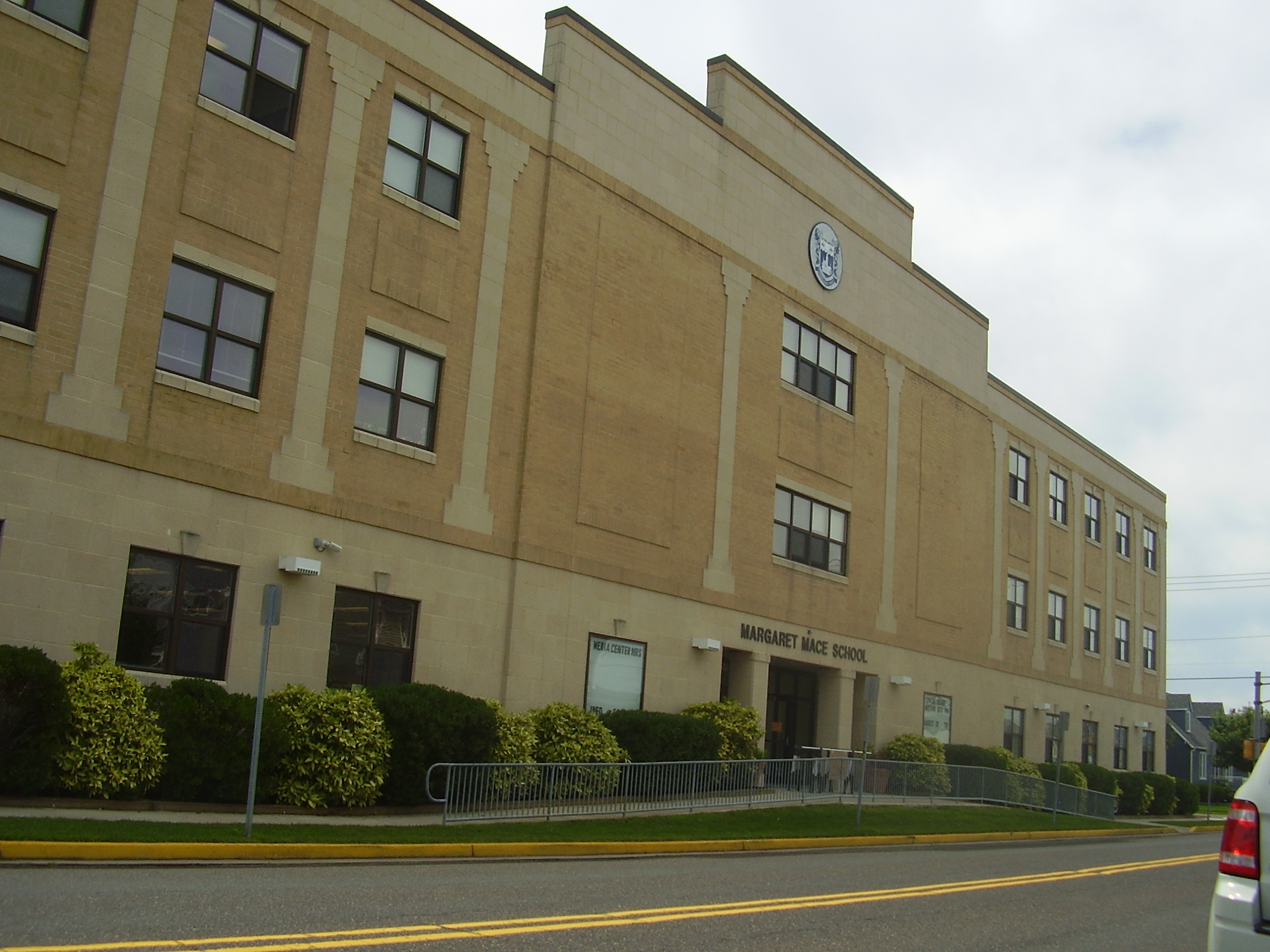
West Wildwood students are zoned to Margaret Mace School of the North Wildwood School District for grades PreK–8.

Public school students from West Wildwood, a non-operating school district, attend Margaret Mace School in North Wildwood for grades PreK–8 as part of a sending/receiving relationship with the North Wildwood School District. As of the 2024–25 school year, the district, comprised of one school, had an enrollment of 164 students and 29.0 classroom teachers (on an FTE basis), for a student–teacher ratio of 5.7:1. In 2019, North Wildwood district received 20 students from West Wildwood, making up 11% of the North Wildwood district enrollment.

For ninth through twelfth grades, public school students from West Wildwood attend Wildwood High School in Wildwood as part of a sending/receiving relationship with the Wildwood City School District, together with students from North Wildwood and Wildwood Crest. As of the 2024–25 school year, the high school had an enrollment of 261 students and 26.4 classroom teachers (on an FTE basis), for a student–teacher ratio of 9.9:1.

Students are also eligible to attend Cape May County Technical High School in the Cape May Court House area, which serves students from the entire county in its comprehensive and vocational programs, which are offered without charge to students who are county residents. Special needs students may be referred to Cape May County Special Services School District in the Cape May Court House area.

In 2020, the West Wildwood School Board commissioned a study from Stockton University exploring the impact of switching K–8 education to the Wildwood City School District, which triggered a negative reaction from multiple parents who preferred that their children attend Mace School in North Wildwood. The study estimated that West Wildwood would save more than $175,000 per year if it switched to the Wildwood City district for K–8.

== Transportation ==
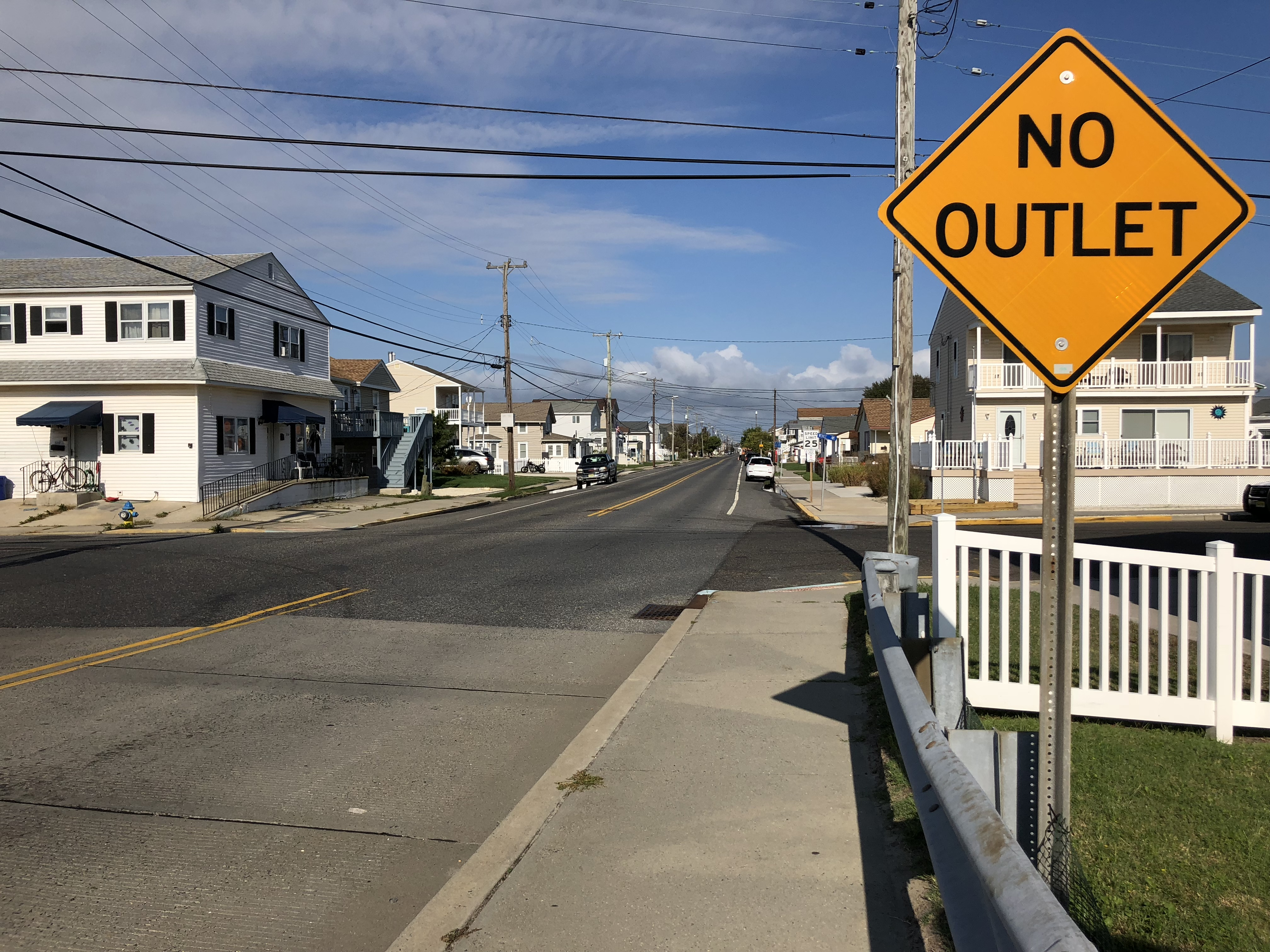
County Route 614 entering West Wildwood

As of May 2010, the borough had a total of 5.59 miles (9.00 km) of roadways, of which 4.79 miles (7.71 km) were maintained by the municipality and 0.80 miles (1.29 km) by Cape May County.

County Route 614 (Glenwood Avenue) runs through the borough to its northern tip.
