= Frank Vogel =

American basketball coach (born 1973)

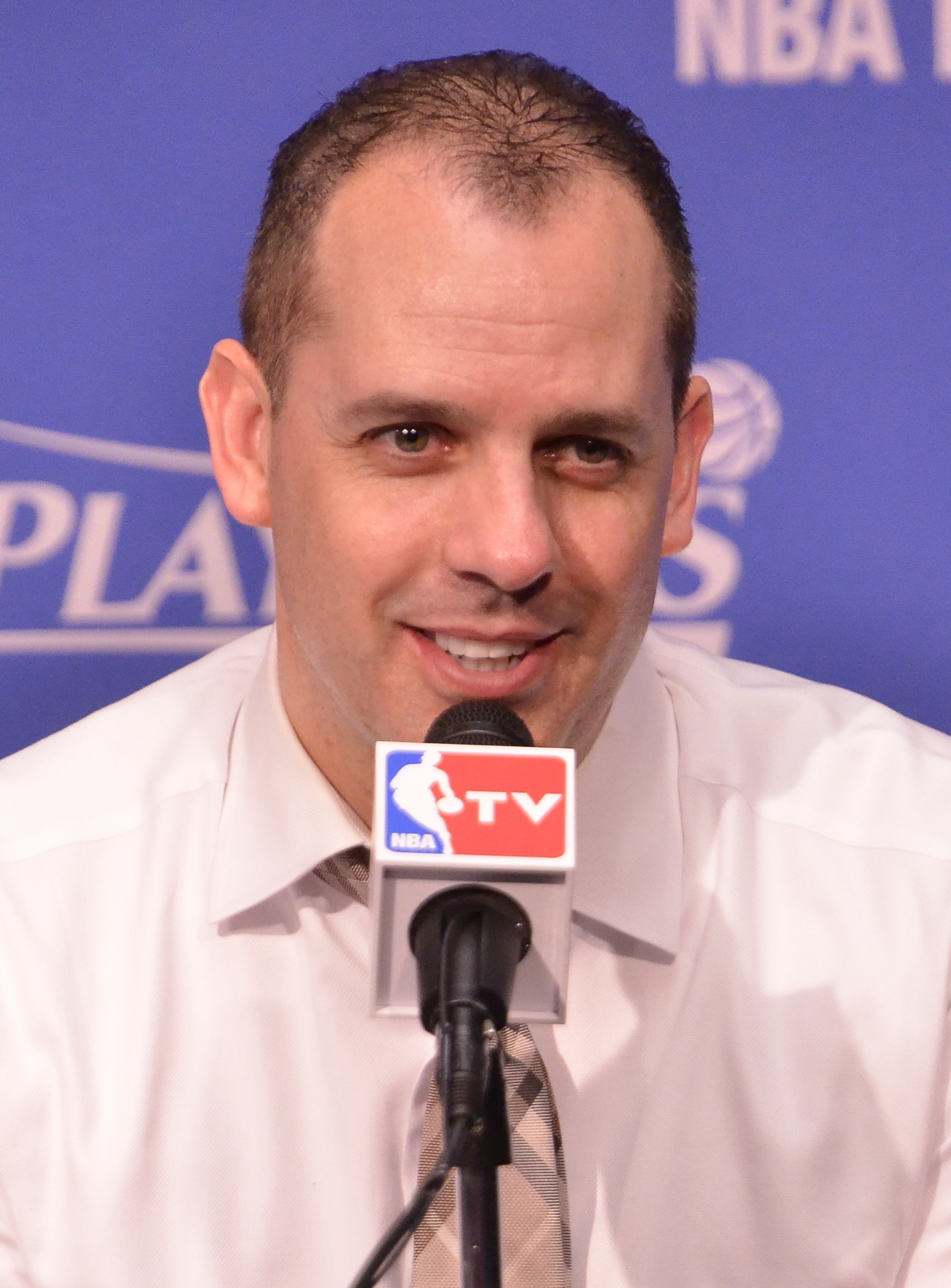
- Vogel in 2014

Golden State Warriors
- Title: Associate head coach
- League: NBA

Personal information
- Born: June 21, 1973 (age 53) Wildwood Crest, New Jersey, U.S.

Career information
- High school: Wildwood (Wildwood, New Jersey)
- College: Juniata (1991–1994)
- Position: Point guard
- Coaching career: 2001–present

Career history

Coaching
- 2001–2004: Boston Celtics (assistant)
- 2004–2005: Philadelphia 76ers (assistant)
- 2007–2011: Indiana Pacers (assistant)
- 2011–2016: Indiana Pacers
- 2016–2018: Orlando Magic
- 2019–2022: Los Angeles Lakers
- 2023–2024: Phoenix Suns
- 2025–2026: Dallas Mavericks (assistant)
- 2026–present: Golden State Warriors (associate HC)

Career highlights
- As head coach: NBA champion (2020); 2× NBA All-Star Game head coach (2014, 2020)

Frank Paul Vogel (born June 21, 1973) is an American professional basketball coach who is the associate head coach for the Golden State Warriors of the National Basketball Association (NBA). He previously served as the head coach for the Orlando Magic, Indiana Pacers, Los Angeles Lakers, and Phoenix Suns. He led the Lakers to an NBA championship in 2020. Vogel began his career as an assistant coach for the Pacers, Philadelphia 76ers, and Boston Celtics.

== Early life and education ==
Vogel grew up in Wildwood Crest, New Jersey. The Vogel family has lived in the Philadelphia/South Jersey area since mid-1870, when Frank's great-grandparents, Henry and Catherine Vogel, settled there a decade after immigrating from Rhenish Bavaria. During his eighth-grade year, he was featured in an episode of Late Night with David Letterman during the Stupid Human Tricks segment, in which he spun a basketball on a toothbrush while brushing his teeth.

On December 10, 1990, Vogel's childhood home caught fire and everything in the house was destroyed. Vogel, who was 17 years old at the time, and his mother—the only two people in the house at the time—escaped out of a window.

Vogel graduated from Wildwood High School in 1991.

Vogel was recruited as a basketball player by two colleges and chose Juniata College in Huntingdon, Pennsylvania, for its science program. He played as a point guard and was a starter on the school's Division III basketball team.

In 1994, Vogel transferred to the University of Kentucky. Vogel served as the student manager for the Kentucky Wildcats men's team under head coach Rick Pitino in the 1994–95 season. The following season, Pitino resurrected the school's junior varsity team, and Vogel played for them. Vogel graduated from Kentucky with a B.S. in biology in 1998.

== Coaching career ==
=== Boston Celtics (2001–2004) ===
Vogel began his career as the head video coordinator for the Boston Celtics under head coach Rick Pitino. He retained that position for five years before being promoted to assistant coach in the 2001–02 season.

=== Philadelphia 76ers (2004–2005) ===
After coaching with Boston, Vogel went on to become an assistant for the Philadelphia 76ers. Vogel left the 76ers to become an advance scout for the Los Angeles Lakers from 2005 to 2006 and the Washington Wizards from 2006 to 2007.

=== Indiana Pacers (2007–2016) ===
Vogel became an assistant for the Indiana Pacers in 2007 under former Celtics and 76ers colleague Jim O'Brien.

On January 30, 2011, after O'Brien was fired from his head coaching position, Vogel was named interim coach. As interim coach, Vogel led the Pacers to the playoffs for the first time since 2006. Vogel was officially named as the Pacers' head coach on July 6, 2011.

Shortly before the Indiana Pacers were to take on the Miami Heat in the 2012 Eastern Conference semifinals, Vogel criticized his opponents for alleged flopping: "They are the biggest flopping team in the NBA. It'll be very interesting (to see) how the referees officiate the series and how much flopping they reward... Every drive to the basket, they have guys not making a play on the ball, but sliding in front of drivers. Often times they're falling down even before contact is even being made. It'll be interesting to see how the series is officiated." He was fined $15,000 by the league for these remarks.

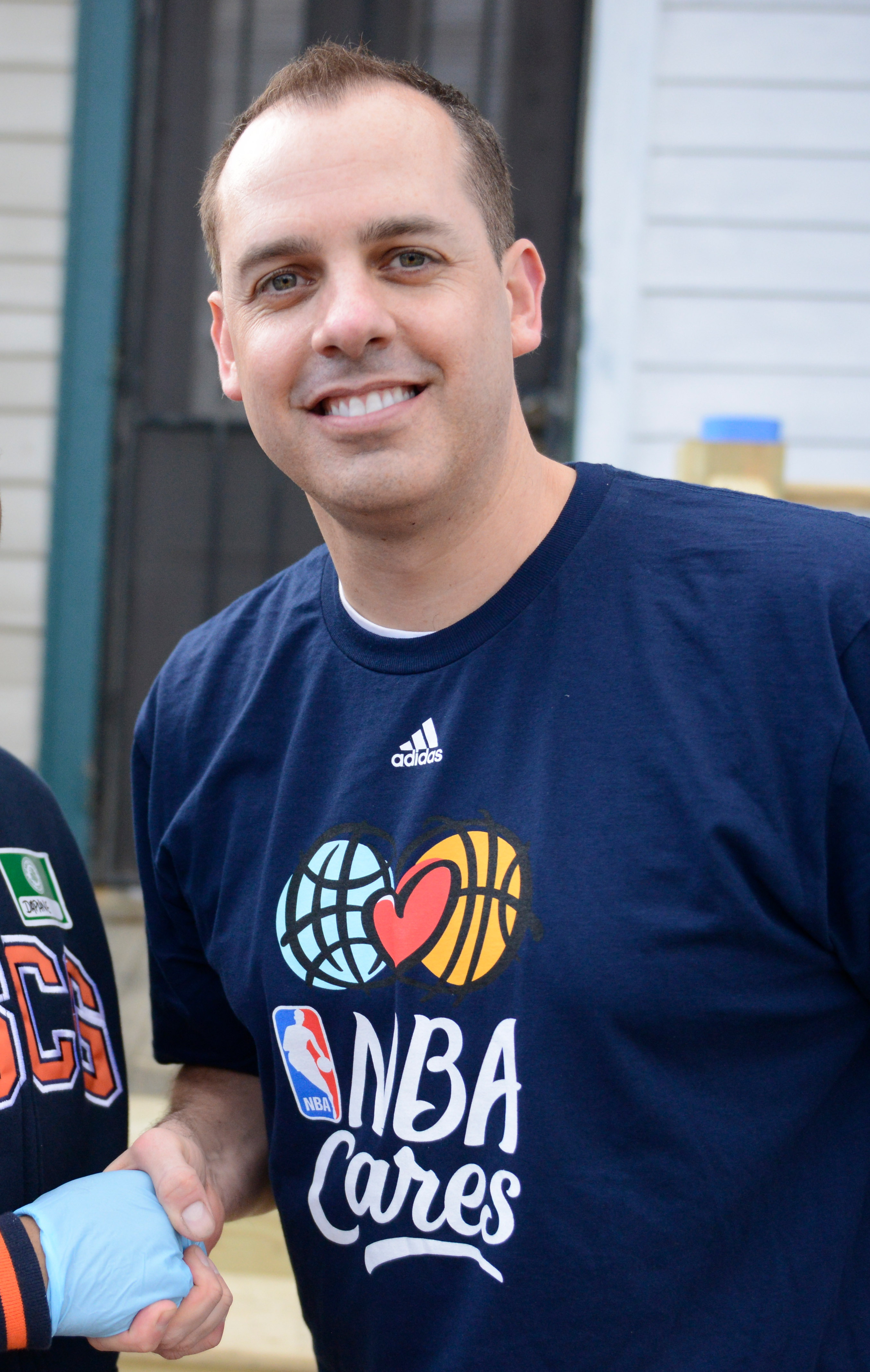
Vogel at an NBA Cares event in 2014

On April 7, 2013, the Pacers clinched their first Central Division title since 2004. They finished the 2012–13 season with a 49–32 record, clinching the third seed in the Eastern Conference. After defeating both the Atlanta Hawks and the New York Knicks in six games, the Pacers went on to face the Miami Heat in the Eastern Conference finals. In game 1, the Pacers were defeated by the Heat 103–102 in overtime after LeBron James drove by Paul George for a wide-open layup with 2.2 seconds left on the clock. Vogel was roundly criticized for leaving the Pacers' primary defender, Roy Hibbert, on the bench during the final play. Vogel said that he made that decision out of concern of Chris Bosh and acknowledged that he might do it differently next time. In a back-and-forth series where neither team won consecutive games, the Pacers lost in seven games.

On January 14, 2014, Vogel was named the Eastern Conference head coach for the 2014 NBA All-Star Game. He had guided the team to their best start in franchise history, en route to a 56–26 record, good for first in the Eastern Conference. However, for the second consecutive year, the Pacers lost to the Miami Heat in the conference finals.

Vogel signed a two-year contract extension with the Indiana Pacers, to keep him through 2016. With Paul George missing all but six games of the season due to injury, the Pacers just missed the playoffs due to tiebreakers with the Brooklyn Nets. Vogel brought the team back to the playoffs with a retooled and rejuvenated roster the following season; however, they fell to the Toronto Raptors in seven games in the first round.

On May 5, 2016, following the loss to the Raptors, Pacers' president Larry Bird announced that Vogel's contract would not be renewed, citing a need for "a new voice" to lead the players. He departed Indiana as the franchise's all-time leader in NBA wins (Bobby "Slick" Leonard has the most total victories as the Pacers' head coach, with the majority coming in the ABA).

=== Orlando Magic (2016–2018) ===
On May 20, 2016, Vogel was named the head coach of the Orlando Magic. He oversaw a young, developing team and dealt with a change in the front office after his first year when Rob Hennigan, the general manager who hired him, was replaced with John Hammond. He went 54–110, missing the playoffs both seasons. On April 12, 2018, Vogel was fired by the Magic after the conclusion of the 2017–18 season.

=== Los Angeles Lakers (2019–2022) ===
On May 13, 2019, Vogel was named the head coach of the Los Angeles Lakers. In his first season in 2019–20, the Lakers developed into one of the league's top defensive teams. He led the team to a 52–19 record and an NBA championship, having the best record in the Western Conference and third-best record in the league. Vogel was named a head coach of 2020 NBA All-Star Game due to the Lakers holding the best record in the West. In the playoffs, the Lakers defeated the Portland Trail Blazers, Houston Rockets, and Denver Nuggets in five games each. In the 2020 NBA Finals, they beat the Miami Heat in six games to claim the 17th NBA title in Lakers' history, tying Boston for the most championships. The team spent over 100 days in the NBA bubble after the season resumed from its four-month suspension due to the COVID-19 pandemic.

In his second season, the Lakers finished with a 42–30 record as Anthony Davis and LeBron James sustained injuries throughout the season. Training camp began 71 days after the end of the NBA Finals, the shortest NBA offseason ever. The Lakers were 21–6 when Davis injured his Achilles, which sidelined him for 30 games. They advanced from the play-in tournament and made the playoffs as the No. 7 seed, but were eliminated in the first round by the eventual Western Conference champion Phoenix Suns in six games.

After trading for Russell Westbrook, the Lakers entered the 2021–22 season as the favorites to win the conference. Vogel used 41 different starting lineups, as James and Davis again missed significant time to injuries. The Lakers finished 11th in the Western Conference with a 33–49 record and missed the playoffs. On April 11, 2022, Vogel was fired by the Lakers. He went 127–98 in three seasons.

=== Phoenix Suns (2023–2024) ===
On June 6, 2023, Vogel was hired as head coach by the Phoenix Suns. Vogel led the Suns to a 49–33 record and made the playoffs as the No. 6 seed. They were swept by the Minnesota Timberwolves in the first round.

On May 9, 2024, Vogel was fired after one season with the Suns.

=== Dallas Mavericks (2024–2026) ===
On October 2, 2024, Vogel was hired as a coaching consultant for head coach Jason Kidd of the Dallas Mavericks. They later hired him as an assistant coach. His departure from the staff was announced on July 6, 2026.

=== Golden State Warriors (2026–present) ===
On July 12, 2026, the Golden State Warriors hired Vogel to serve as the team's associate head coach under Steve Kerr.

== Head coaching record ==
Legend
Regular season	G	Games coached	W	Games won	L	Games lost	W–L %	Win–loss %
Playoffs	PG	Playoff games	PW	Playoff wins	PL	Playoff losses	PW–L %	Playoff win–loss %

Team	Year	G	W	L	W–L%	Finish	PG	PW	PL	PW–L%	Result
Indiana	2010–11	38	20	18	.526	2nd in Central	5	1	4	.200	Lost in First round
Indiana	2011–12	66	42	24	.636	2nd in Central	11	6	5	.545	Lost in Conference semifinals
Indiana	2012–13	81	49	32	.605	1st in Central	19	11	8	.579	Lost in Conference finals
Indiana	2013–14	82	56	26	.683	1st in Central	19	10	9	.526	Lost in Conference finals
Indiana	2014–15	82	38	44	.463	3rd in Central	—	—	—	—	Missed playoffs
Indiana	2015–16	82	45	37	.549	2nd in Central	7	3	4	.429	Lost in First round
Orlando	2016–17	82	29	53	.354	5th in Southeast	—	—	—	—	Missed playoffs
Orlando	2017–18	82	25	57	.305	4th in Southeast	—	—	—	—	Missed playoffs
L.A. Lakers	2019–20	71	52	19	.732	1st in Pacific	21	16	5	.762	Won NBA championship
L.A. Lakers	2020–21	72	42	30	.583	3rd in Pacific	6	2	4	.333	Lost in First round
L.A. Lakers	2021–22	82	33	49	.402	4th in Pacific	—	—	—	—	Missed playoffs
Phoenix	2023–24	82	49	33	.598	2nd in Pacific	4	0	4	.000	Lost in First round
Career		902	480	422	.532		92	49	43	.533	

== Personal life ==
Vogel married his wife Jenifer in 2002. They have two daughters.
