= Wildwood City School District =

School district in Cape May County, New Jersey, US

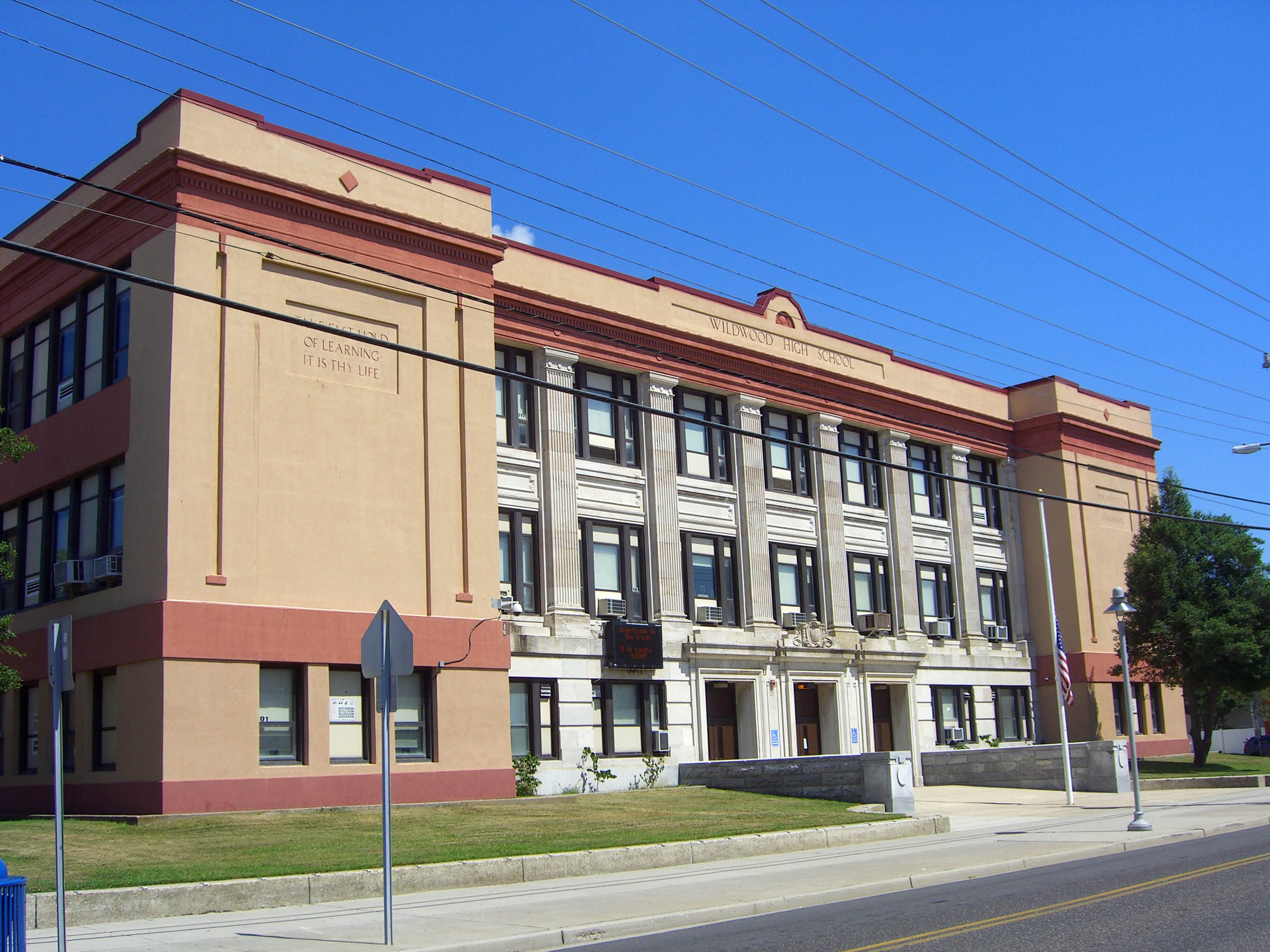
- Wildwood High School (the same address is for Wildwood Middle School and the district administration, and it previously housed Elementary School #1)

Address
- 4300 Pacific Avenue Wildwood, Cape May County, New Jersey, 08260
- Coordinates: 38.985653°N 74.819157°W

District information
- Grades: PreK-12
- Superintendent: John K. Kummings
- Business administrator: Jason Fuscellaro
- Schools: 3

Students and staff
- Enrollment: 818 (as of 2023–24)
- Faculty: 77.0 FTEs
- Student–teacher ratio: 10.6:1

Other information
- District Factor Group: A
- Website: www.wwschools.org
Ind.	Per pupil	District spending	Rank (*)	K-12 average	%± vs. average
1A	Total Spending	$23,862	47	$18,891	26.3%
1	Budgetary Cost	17,626	44	14,783	19.2%
2	Classroom Instruction	10,383	45	8,763	18.5%
6	Support Services	2,847	42	2,392	19.0%
8	Administrative Cost	1,841	37	1,485	24.0%
10	Operations & Maintenance	1,887	39	1,783	5.8%
13	Extracurricular Activities	667	44	268	148.9%
16	Median Teacher Salary	70,783	45	64,043
Data from NJDoE 2014 Taxpayers' Guide to Education Spending. *Of K-12 districts with up to 1,800 students. Lowest spending=1; Highest=49

The Wildwood City School District is a comprehensive community public school district that serves students in pre-kindergarten through twelfth grade from Wildwood, in Cape May County, in the U.S. state of New Jersey. Its headquarters are on the grounds of Wildwood Middle School and Wildwood High School.

As of the 2023–24 school year, the district, comprised of three schools, had an enrollment of 818 students and 77.0 classroom teachers (on an FTE basis), for a student–teacher ratio of 10.6:1.

The district had been classified by the New Jersey Department of Education as being in District Factor Group "A", the lowest of eight groupings. District Factor Groups organize districts statewide to allow comparison by common socioeconomic characteristics of the local districts. From lowest socioeconomic status to highest, the categories are A, B, CD, DE, FG, GH, I and J.

For ninth through twelfth grades, students from North Wildwood, West Wildwood and Wildwood Crest attend Wildwood High School as part of sending/receiving relationships.

== History ==
The district formed in 1912 with the merger of Wildwood Borough and Holly Beach Borough school systems. The first school in the Wildwoods opened in 1882. After 1934, the city was at that time divided between the Glenwood Avenue and Wildwood High building zones for elementary school, with Garfield Avenue as the boundary; the Wildwood High building had grades 1-12 at the time.

Previously the district maintained Elementary School #1, for grades 5 and 6, at 4300 Pacific Avenue (at the site of the high school).

Andrew Avenue School was a K-8 school which opened in 1886 and closed in 1934. A park was established on the site of the school.

Beginning in 1915, in the era of de jure educational segregation in the United States, Arctic Avenue School #4, with four classrooms, had segregated facilities for black children for grades 1-6. It stopped operations in 1949. By 1948 Wildwood's elementary took both white and black students but maintained separate classrooms on the basis of race.

== Schools ==
Schools in the district (with 2023–24 enrollment data from the National Center for Education Statistics) are:

Elementary school

- Glenwood Avenue Elementary School with 378 students in grades PreK-5
  - Travis LaFerriere, principal
  - The initial building opened in 1904, and the current building was established in 1955.

Middle school

- Wildwood Middle School with 159 students in grades 6-8
  - Phillip Schaffer, principal

High school

- Wildwood High School with 255 students in grades 9-12
  - Phillip Schaffer, principal
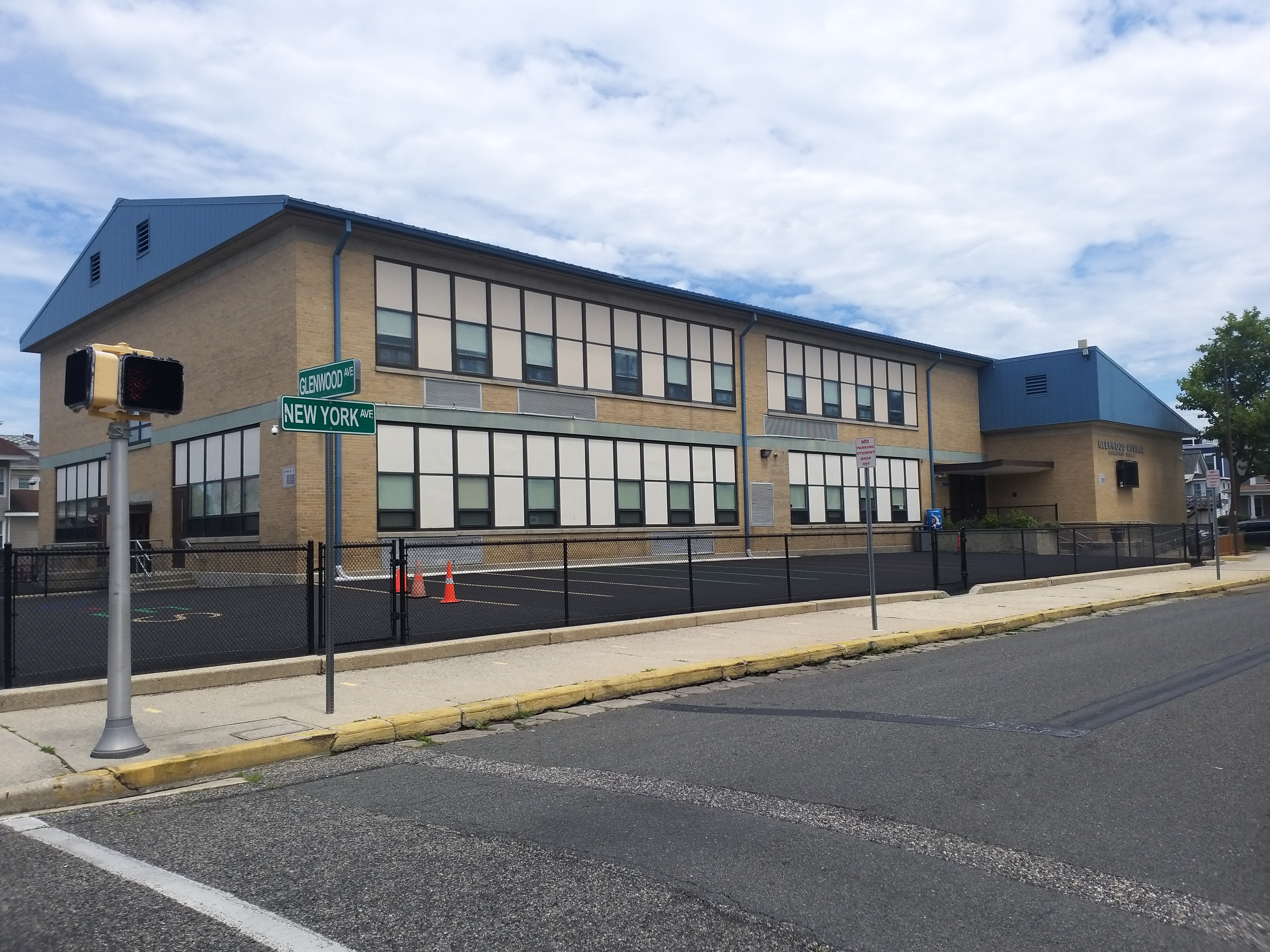
Glenwood Avenue Elementary School

== Administration ==
Core members of the district's administration are:

- John K. Kummings, superintendent
- Jason Fuscellaro, business administrator and board secretary

== Board of education ==
The district's board of education, comprised of nine members, sets policy and oversees the fiscal and educational operation of the district through its administration. As a Type II school district, the board's trustees are elected directly by voters to serve three-year terms of office on a staggered basis, with three seats up for election each year held (since 2012) as part of the November general election. The board appoints a superintendent to oversee the district's day-to-day operations and a business administrator to supervise the business functions of the district. A non-voting board member represents North Wildwood
