= Wildwood High School =

High school in Cape May County, New Jersey, US

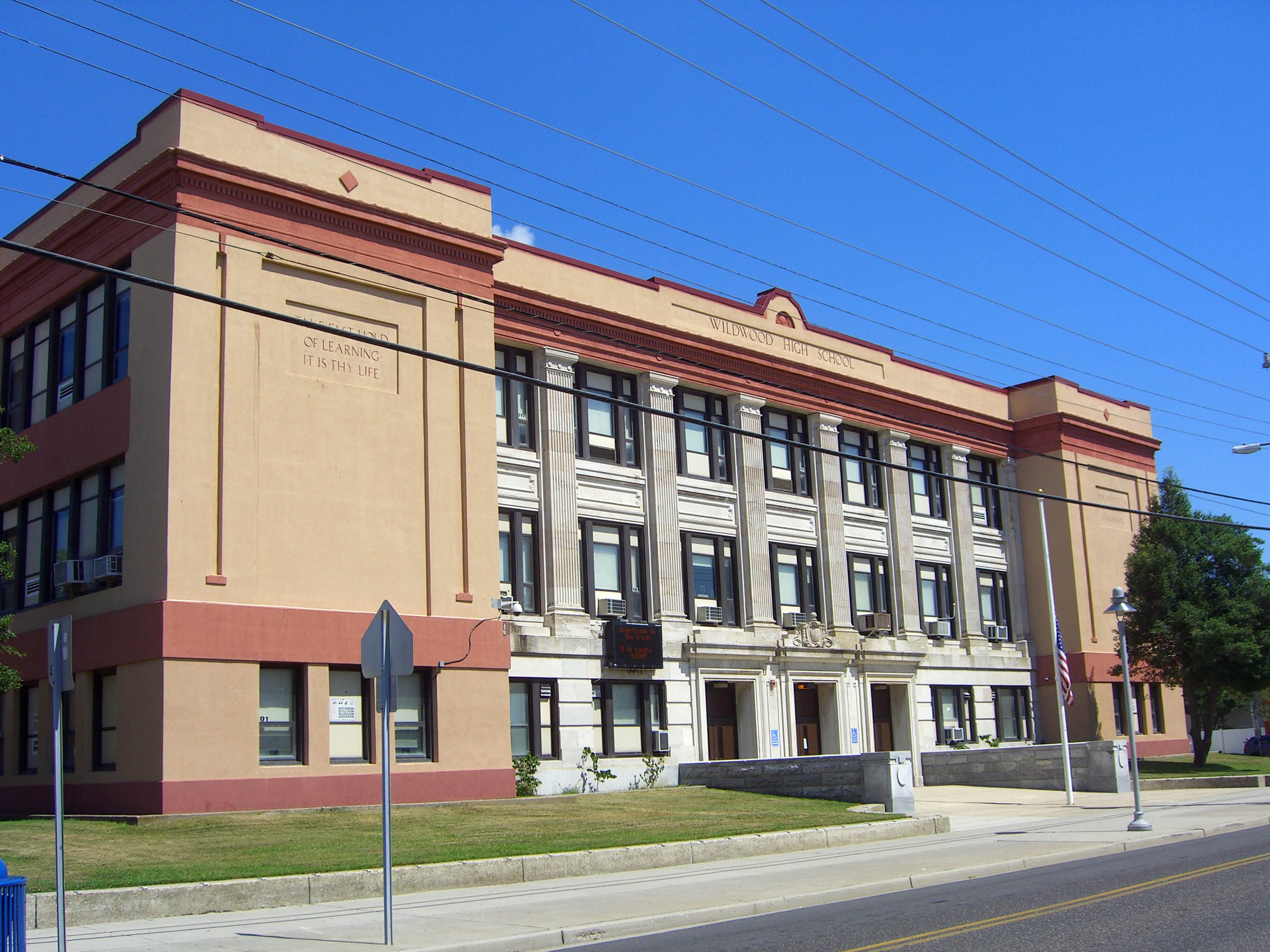

Location
- 4300 Pacific Avenue; Wildwood, Cape May County, New Jersey 08260; United States; 38.985653°N 74.819157°W

Information
- Type: Public high school
- School district: Wildwood Public School District
- NCES School ID: 341794001768
- Principal: Tricia Lemma
- Faculty: 26.4 FTEs
- Grades: 9-12
- Enrollment: 261 (as of 2024–25)
- Student to teacher ratio: 9.9:1
- Colors: Maroon and white
- Athletics conference: Cape-Atlantic League (general); West Jersey Football League (football)
- Team name: Warriors
- Website: www.wwschools.org/wildwood-high-school

Wildwood High School is a comprehensive community public high school that serves students in ninth through twelfth grades from Wildwood, in Cape May County, in the U.S. state of New Jersey. It is the sole secondary school of the Wildwood City School District.

The school has been accredited by the Middle States Association of Colleges and Schools Commission on Elementary and Secondary Schools since 1991. Students from North Wildwood, West Wildwood and Wildwood Crest attend Wildwood High School as part of sending/receiving relationships with their respective school districts.

As of the 2024–25 school year, the school had an enrollment of 261 students and 26.4 classroom teachers (on an FTE basis), for a student–teacher ratio of 9.9:1. There were 181 students (69.3% of enrollment) eligible for free lunch and 5 (1.9% of students) eligible for reduced-cost lunch.

Wildwood Middle School and the Wildwood Public School District administration share the Wildwood High property. The same building formerly housed Elementary School #1, for grades 5 and 6, along with Wildwood High.

== History ==
The first high school class of Wildwood graduated in 1906. The current building opened in 1917. At one time this building had grades 1-12. In 1927 and 1967 the building received additions.

== Awards, recognition and rankings ==
In September 2013, the school was one of 15 in New Jersey to be recognized by the United States Department of Education as part of the National Blue Ribbon Schools Program, an award called the "most prestigious honor in the United States' education system" and which Education Secretary Arne Duncan described as honoring schools that "represent examples of educational excellence".

The school was the 285th-ranked public high school in New Jersey out of 339 schools statewide in New Jersey Monthly magazine's September 2014 cover story on the state's "Top Public High Schools", using a new ranking methodology. The school had been ranked 244th in the state of 328 schools in 2012, after being ranked 279th in 2010 out of 322 schools listed. The magazine ranked the school 253rd in 2008 out of 316 schools. The school was ranked 299th in the magazine's September 2006 issue, which surveyed 316 schools across the state. Schooldigger.com ranked the school as 321st out of 376 public high schools statewide in its 2010 rankings (a decrease of 11 positions from the 2009 rank) which were based on the combined percentage of students classified as proficient or above proficient on the language arts literacy and mathematics components of the High School Proficiency Assessment (HSPA).

== Athletics ==
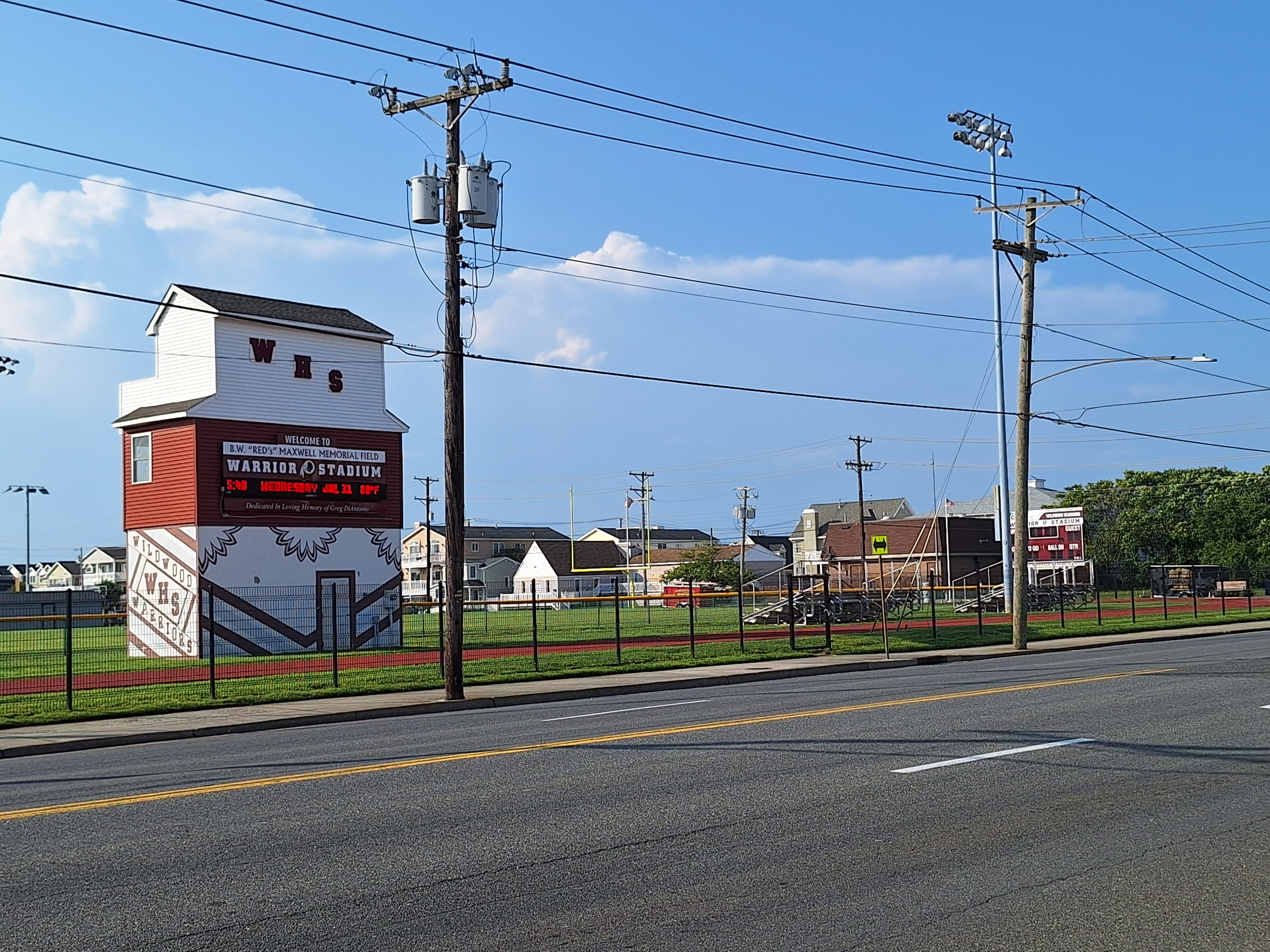
B. W. "Red's" Maxwell Memorial Field at Byrne Community Center, used for athletic purposes by WHS

The Wildwood High School Warriors compete as one of the member schools in the Cape-Atlantic League, which is comprised of public and private high schools located in Atlantic County, Cape May County, Cumberland County The conference is overseen by the New Jersey State Interscholastic Athletic Association (NJSIAA). With 183 students in grades 9-12, the school was classified by the NJSIAA for the 2022-23 school year as South, Group 1 for most athletic competition purposes, which included schools with an enrollment of 75 to 476 students in that grade range. The football team competes in the Horizon Division of the 94-team West Jersey Football League superconference and was classified by the NJSIAA as Group I South for football for 2024–2026, which included schools with 185 to 482 students.

The school switched to the Tri-County Conference for the 2002-03 school year as part of an effort to find appropriate matchups for its football team and returned to the Cape-Atlantic League in the 2026-27 season, which it had belonged to for decades.

The boys' basketball team won the Group II state title in 1940 vs. Bogota High School and 1941 vs. Pompton Lakes High School, and won the Group I title in 1942 against Bernardsville High School, in 1961 vs. North Arlington High School and in 1964 vs. Wallington High School. After playoff losses in the four previous seasons, the 1940 team won the Group II title after defeating Bogota by a score of 34-18 in the championship game. The 1941 team puled ahead with a 7-0 run in the first quarter and held on to repeat as state champion after defeating Pompton Lakes by a score of 39-35 in the finals. Led by 18 points from future NFL player Randy Beverly, the 1961 team won the Group I state title with a 65-50 win against North Arlington in the championship game played at Princeton University's Dillon Gymnasium.

The softball team won the Group I state championship in 1976, defeating Wood-Ridge High School in the final round of the tournament.

The girls' basketball team won the 1991 Group I state championship (against runner-up Cresskill High School in the finals), 2000 (vs. North Warren Regional High School) and in both 2001 and 2002 (against Mountain Lakes High School both seasons).

== Administration ==
The principal is Tricia Lemma. The administration team includes two assistant principal. Lemma became principal of the middle / high school in July 2023.

== Notable alumni ==
- Randy Beverly (born 1944, class of 1962), former professional American football player
- Greg Fulginiti (born 1951, class of 1969), recording and mastering engineer
- Lou Harry (class of 1982), author and playwright
- Wes Hills (born 1995, class of 2013), American football running back who has played in the NFL for the Detroit Lions
- Robert E. Kay (1916–1990, class of 1933), politician who served in the New Jersey Senate and New Jersey General Assembly
- Bill Osborn (born 1966, class of 1984), football scout and color analyst who played in the National Football League, World League and the Arena Football League
- Frank Vogel (born 1973, class of 1991), head coach of the Phoenix Suns, who has also been an assistant with the Philadelphia 76ers, Boston Celtics, Los Angeles Lakers, and Washington Wizards

== Notable faculty ==
- Betty Jackson King (1928–1994), pianist, singer, teacher, choral conductor and composer who was best known for her vocal works
