= CMS =

CMS may refer to:

== Banking and finance ==
- Collateral management system, in banking
- Constant maturity swap, in finance and investing

== Law ==
- CMS Cameron McKenna Nabarro Olswang, an international law firm based in London
- Community Management Statement, a document for defining the lot entitlements in a Community Title Scheme, a form of strata title in Queensland, Australia
- Convention on Migratory Species, or the Bonn Convention, an intergovernmental wildlife conservation treaty. Official name: Convention on the Conservation of Migratory Species of Wild Animals

== Organizations ==
=== Schools ===
==== United States ====
- Calexico Mission School, a private school in Calexico, California, US
- Cardigan Mountain School, a junior boarding school in Canaan, New Hampshire, US
- Carpentersville Middle School, a public school in Carpentersville, Illinois, US
- Caruso Middle School, a public school in Deerfield, Illinois, US
- Cedar Middle School, a public school in Cedar City, Utah, US
- Centennial Middle School, a public school in Snohomish, Washington, US
- Charlotte-Mecklenburg Schools, local school district in North Carolina, US
- Chicago Medical School, in North Chicago, Illinois
- Chickahominy Middle School, a public school in Mechanicsville, Virginia, US
- Claremont-Mudd-Scripps Stags and Athenas, the joint athletic team of Claremont McKenna College, Harvey Mudd College, and Scripps College in Claremont, California, US
- Clarksville Middle School, a public school in Clarksville, Maryland, US
- Colina Middle School, in Thousand Oaks, California, US
- Colonia Middle School In Colonia, New Jersey, US
- Community Middle School, a public school in Plainsboro, New Jersey, US
- Creekwood Middle School, a public school in Kingwood, Houston, Texas, US
- Crestview Middle School, a middle school in Clarkson Valley, St. Louis County, Missouri, US
- Crest Memorial School (of the Wildwood Crest School District), a public K-8 school in Wildwood Crest, New Jersey, US
- Department of Computer and Mathematical Sciences (University of Toronto), Canada

==== India ====
- Church Mission Society High School, CMS High School, Thrissur, Kerala
- City Montessori School, in Lucknow
- CMS College Kottayam, in Kottayam, Kerala

==== Other schools ====
- Church Mission School, Pakistan
- C.M.S. Ladies' College, Colombo, Sri Lanka

=== Mathematics organizations ===
- Calcutta Mathematical Society or CalMathSoc, a professional society for mathematicians at Kolkata, India
- Canadian Mathematical Society, a professional society for mathematicians
- Centre for Mathematical Sciences (disambiguation), several organisations
  - Centre for Mathematical Sciences (Cambridge), the mathematics centre at Cambridge University
  - Centre for Mathematical Sciences (Kerala), India
- Council for the Mathematical Sciences, a forum for mathematical societies in the UK
- Cyprus Mathematical Society, a non-profit society in Cyprus
- Chinese Mathematical Society, a professional society for mathematicians in China

=== Other organizations ===
- CMS Enhancements, a semi-defunct American computer systems and data storage company
- Centers for Medicare and Medicaid Services, a federal agency in the US, part of the Department of Health and Human Services
- China Marine Surveillance, the maritime surveillance agency of the People's Republic of China
- Church Mission Society, an evangelistic religious organization, formerly the Church Missionary Society
- CMS Cameron McKenna Nabarro Olswang, an international law firm based in London
- CMS Energy, a public utility in Michigan
- Colorado Medical Society, a non-profit organization of physicians in Colorado
- Colorado Memory Systems, a defunct American data tape drive manufacturer
- Court of Master Sommeliers, an organisation educating and certifying sommeliers
- Illinois Department of Central Management Services, a state agency

== Science and technology ==
=== Computing ===
- Call management system, software used in call centres
- CMS-2, a programming language implemented for and used by the US Navy
- Code Morphing Software, a technology used by Transmeta
- Collection management system for a museum collection
- Color management system, a system for computers to control the representation of colors
- Concurrent mark sweep collector, a garbage collector in the Oracle HotSpot Java virtual machine
- Configuration management system
- Construction and management simulation, a type of simulation video game
- Contact management system, an integrated office solution to record relationships and interactions with customers and suppliers
- Content management system, a system for managing content and providing it in various formats
- Conversational Monitor System, previously Cambridge Monitor System, an IBM mainframe operating system, also known as VM/CMS and CP/CMS
- Course management system, software that facilitates e-learning or computer learning
- Credential management system, also known as smart card management system (SCMS) and card management system (CMS)
- Cryptographic Message Syntax, a cryptographic standard

=== Medicine ===
- Chronic mountain sickness, or Monge's disease, a disease caused by high altitude
- Congenital mitral stenosis
- Congenital myasthenic syndrome, an inherited neuromuscular disorder

=== Other uses in science and technology ===
- Cable management system, the managing of electrical or optical cable
- Cavity monitoring system, a system for surveying stopes in an underground mine where it is not safe or possible to send a person
- Central monitoring station, another name for an alarm monitoring center
- Central Monitoring System, an Indian clandestine mass electronic surveillance program
- Changeable-message sign, a variable road sign
- China Manned Space Program, China's human spaceflight program started in 1992
- Compact mass spectrometer
- Compact Muon Solenoid, a particle physics detector at CERN
- Conservation management system, a procedure for maintaining a species or habitat
- Cubic metre per second, a unit of volumetric flow rate
- Cytoplasmic male sterility, in seed breeding

== Other uses ==
- Certified Master Safecracker, an American trade qualification
- Charlotte Motor Speedway, a speedway in Concord, North Carolina, north of Charlotte
- The Chicago Manual of Style, a style guide for American English
- Chief master sergeant, a rank in the US Air Force
- Cms (angel), a minor angel in Enochian occult tradition
- Critical management studies, a left-wing approach to management, business and organization

== See also ==
- CMSS (disambiguation)
- CM (disambiguation)
