= CM =

CM or its variants may refer to:

== Arts and media ==
=== Gaming ===
- Championship Manager, a popular football management simulation game
- Chessmaster, a chess computer program series

=== Music ===
- C minor, abbreviated Cm, a minor scale or chord based on C
- CM (school), a youth and community music organisation
- Classical music, Western art music
- Common metre, abbreviated CM, a poetic metre frequently used in hymns

=== Other media ===
- Correio da Manhã (Portugal), a Portuguese daily newspaper

== Science and technology ==
=== Computing ===
- Configuration management, a systems engineering process for establishing and maintaining consistency
- Connection Machine, series of supercomputers
- Content management, technologies that support the collection, management, and publishing of information
- CyanogenMod, alternative firmware for Android phones, rebranded as LineageOS

=== Medicine ===
- Centromedian nucleus, a part of the thalamus
- Chiari malformation, a narrowing of the skull which puts pressure on the cerebellum
- Chylomicron, lipoprotein with extremely low density
- Contingency management, a type of treatment where patients are rewarded (or, less often, punished) for their behavior

=== Physics and chemistry ===
- C_{m}, the pitching moment coefficient in aerodynamics
- Center of mass in mechanics
- Curium, symbol Cm, a chemical element
- Carboxymethyl group, symbol CM, an organic chemistry functional group
- Cm (space group), three-dimensional space group number 8

=== Units of measure ===
- Centimetre (cm), a SI unit of length equal to one hundredth of a metre
- Coulomb-metre (C m), SI unit of electrical dipole moment
- Centimolar (cM), a unit of molarity
- Centimorgan (cM), a unit for measuring genetic linkage
- Computed mile (c.m.)

=== Other uses in science and technology ===
- CM Draconis, an eclipsing binary system in the constellation of Draco
- Apollo command module, a segment of the Apollo command and service module
- Commercial Message, Japanese abbreviation using Latin script
- Condition monitoring, the process of monitoring a parameter of condition in machinery
- Construction morphology, a theory of linguistic morphology

== Organizations ==
- Canadian Imperial Bank of Commerce (TSX/NYSE: CM), a Canadian bank
- Clare Militia, an Irish Militia regiment from 1798 to 1909 of the British Army
- CM.com, a mobile services company formerly called ClubMessage
- Cooler Master, a Taiwan computer hardware manufacturer

== Places ==
- Cameroon, which has the ISO and FIPS country code "CM"
  - .cm, the country code top-level domain for Cameroon
- CM postcode area, central Essex, England
- Chiang Mai, Thailand
- Northern Mariana Islands, formerly with the U.S. postal code "CM" (now "MP" to avoid confusion with Cameroon)

== Titles and awards ==
- Candidate Master, an international chess title
- Certified Midwife, health care profession
- Chaconia Medal of the Order of the Trinity, a national award of Trinidad and Tobago, post-nominal CM
- Chief Mate, also chief officer, first mate or first officer, is the second-in-command on the ship, directly under the Captain
- Chief Minister, an appointed head of government.
- Order of Canada Member, post-nominal letters C.M.
- Congregation of the Mission, a Roman Catholic religious institute
- Construction mechanic (United States Navy), a Seabee occupational rating in the U.S. Navy
- Knight Commander Royal Order of Monisaraphon, post-nominal letters CM

== Transportation ==
- Chemins de fer du Morbihan, a metre gauge railway network in Brittany, France
- CM Airlines, a domestic airline in Honduras
- Copa Airlines, Panama City, Panama, IATA designator

== Other uses ==
- CM, number 900 in Roman numerals
- Change management, system for dealing with organisational change
- Construction management/Construction manager
- Contract manufacturer, a company that manufactures items for other companies
- Contribution margin, a measure in management accounting
- Cypro-Minoan syllabary, a form of writing used in Cyprus during the Late Bronze Age
- Central midfielder, a position in association football
- A US Navy hull classification symbol: Minelayer (CM)

== See also ==
- CM&, a Colombian TV production company
- CMS (disambiguation)
