= SCMS =

SCMS may refer to:

- School of Communication and Management Studies, Kochi, India
- Scott Creek Middle School, Coquitlam, British Columbia, Canada
- Serial Copy Management System
- Sliding compound miter saw, a type of miter saw
- Smart card management system
- Society for Cinema and Media Studies
- Structured Content Management System
- Supply chain management software
