= A. M. Mathai =

Indian mathematician (1935–2025)

- Born: 28 April 1935; Palai, Kerala, India
- Died: 20 December 2025 (aged 90); Toronto, Canada
- Citizenship: Indian, Canadian
- Education: St. Thomas College, Palai; University of Kerala; University of Toronto
- Known for: Contributions to applied statistics, applications to special functions, reaction rate theory in astrophysics
- Scientific career
- Fields: Mathematics, statistics, astrophysics
- Institutions: McGill University; Centre for Mathematical Sciences, Kerala
- Doctoral advisor: Ralph Wormleighton
- Doctoral students: Serge Provost, Dilip Kumar

Arakaparampil Mathai "Arak" Mathai (28 April 1935 – 20 December 2025) was an Indian and Canadian mathematician who has worked in statistics, applied analysis, applications of special functions, and astrophysics. Mathai established the Centre for Mathematical Sciences, Palai, Kerala, India.

== Education and career ==
Mathai was born in Arakulam near Palai in the Idukki district of Kerala, India as the eldest son of Aley and Arakaparampil Mathai. After completing his high school education in 1953 from St. Thomas High School, Palai, with record marks he joined St. Thomas College, Palai, and obtained his B Sc. degree in mathematics in 1957. In 1959 he completed his master's degree in statistics from University of Kerala, Thiruvananthapuram, Kerala, India, with first class, first rank and gold medal. Then he joined St. Thomas College, Palai, University of Kerala, as a lecturer in Statistics and served there until 1961. He obtained Canadian Commonwealth scholarship in 1961 and went to University of Toronto, Canada, for completing his MA degree in mathematics in 1962. He received his PhD in mathematics from the University of Toronto in 1964 under the supervision of Ralph Wormleighton. Mathai then joined McGill University as an assistant professor and was promoted to an associate professor there in 1968. He became a full professor at McGill in 1979 and served the department of mathematics and statistics until 2000. From 2000 onwards he was an emeritus professor of McGill University.

== Honors and awards ==
In 1998, Mathai was awarded the Founder recognition award from the Statistical Society of Canada, which he was heavily involved in its foundation. He is a fellow of the National Academy of Sciences, India and a fellow of the Institute of Mathematical Statistics.

== Selected publications ==
- Random p-content of a p-parallelotope in Euclidean n-space, Advances in Applied Probability, 31(2), 343–354 (1999).
- An Introduction to Geometrical Probability: Distributional Aspects with Applications, Gordon and Breach, Newark, (1999).
- Jacobians of Matrix Transformations and Functions of Matrix Argument, World Scientific Publishing, New York, (1997).
- Appell's and Humbert's functions of matrix arguments, Linear Algebra and Its Applications, 183, 202–221, (1993).
- On non-central generalized Laplacianness of quadratic forms in normal variables, Journal of Multivariate Analysis, 45, 239–246, (1993).
- (With S.B. Provost), Quadratic Forms in random Variables: Theory and Applications, Marcel Dekker, New York, (1992).
- On a system of differential equations connected with the gravitational instability in a multi-component medium in Newtonian cosmology, Studies in Applied Mathematics, 80, 75–93, (1989).
- (With H.J. Haubold), Modern Problems in Nuclear and Neutrino Astrophysics, Akademie-Verlag, Berlin.
- On a conjecture in geometric probability regarding asymptotic normality of a random simplex, Annals of Probability, 10, 247–251, (1982).
- (With R.S. Katiyar), Exact percentage points for testing independence, Biometrika, 66, 353–356, (1979).
- (With P.N. Rathie), Recent contributions to axiomatic definitions of information and statistical measures through functional equations. In, Essays in Probability and Statistics, Ikeda and others editors, Shinto, Tsusho, Tokyo, pp. 607–633,(1976).
- (With T.A. Davis), Constructing the sunflower head, Mathematical Biosciences, 20, 117–133, (1974).
