= Wildwood Crest, New Jersey =

Borough in Cape May County, New Jersey, US

- Borough
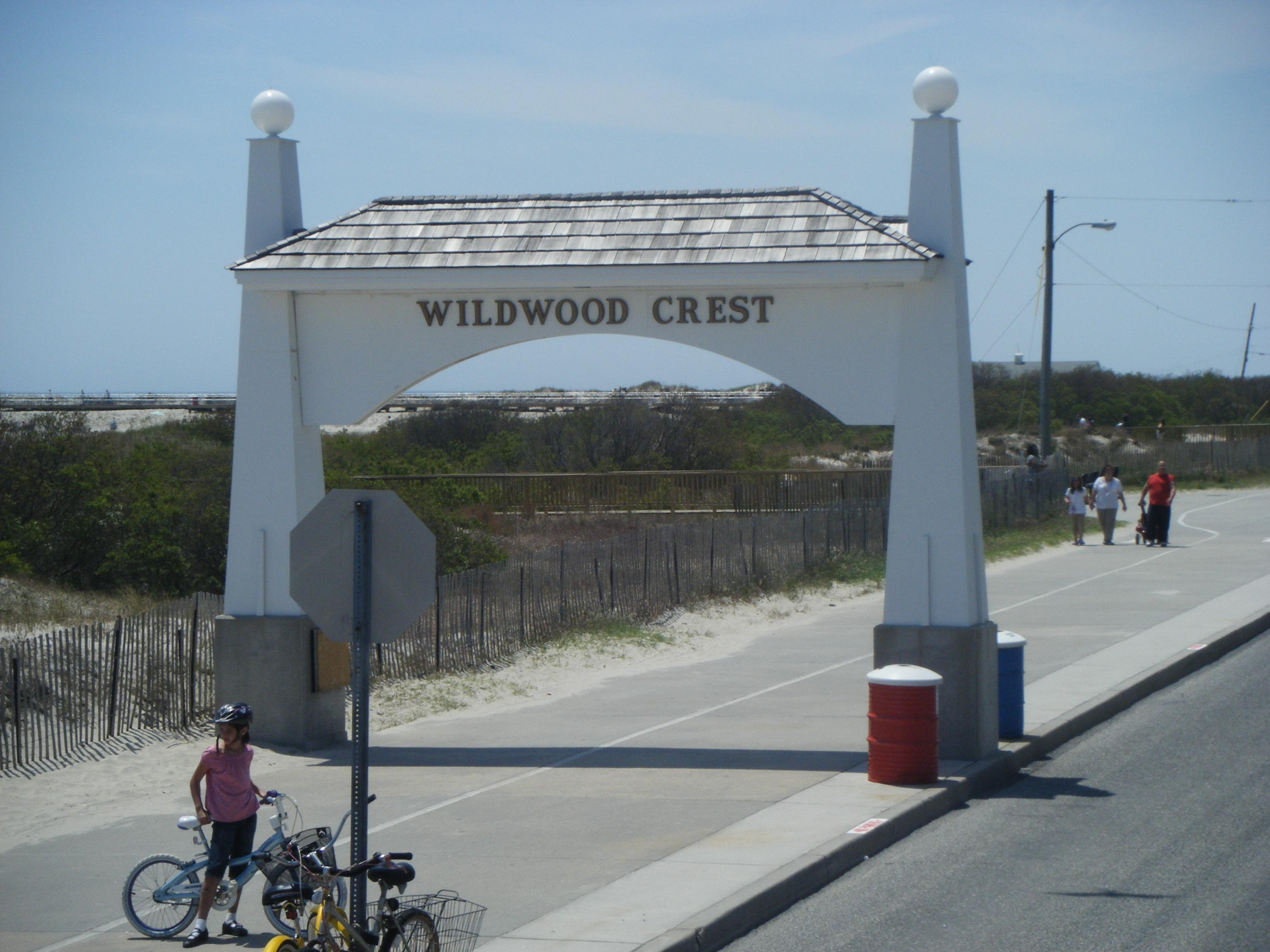
- Wildwood Crest arch

- logo

- Location of Wildwood Crest in Cape May County highlighted in red (left). Inset map: Location of Cape May County in New Jersey highlighted in orange (right).

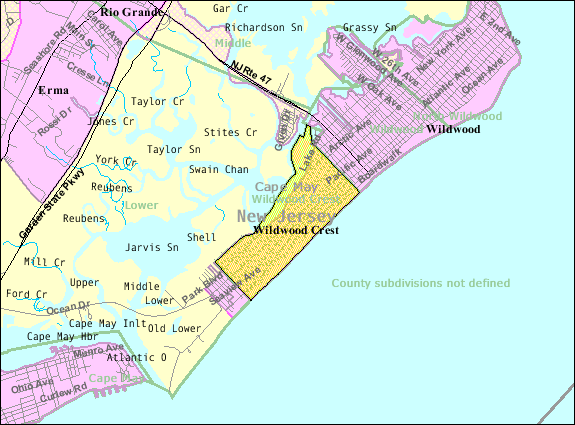
- Census Bureau map of Wildwood Crest, New Jersey

- Location in Cape May County Location in New Jersey Location in the United States
- Coordinates: 38.97°N 74.83°W
- Country: United States
- State: New Jersey
- County: Cape May
- Incorporated: April 6, 1910

Government
  - Type: Walsh Act
  - Body: Board of Commissioners
  - Mayor: Donald Cabrera (term ends December 31, 2025)
  - Municipal clerk: Patricia A. Feketics

Area
  - Total: 1.48 sq mi (3.84 km^{2})
  - Land: 1.30 sq mi (3.36 km^{2})
  - Water: 0.19 sq mi (0.48 km^{2}) 12.50%
  - Rank: 452nd of 565 in state 13th of 16 in county
- Elevation: 3 ft (0.91 m)

Population (2020)
  - Total: 3,101
  - Estimate (2023): 3,063
  - Rank: 445th of 565 in state 8th of 16 in county
  - Density: 2,388.6/sq mi (922.2/km^{2})
  - Rank: 260th of 565 in state 2nd of 16 in county
- Time zone: UTC−05:00 (Eastern (EST))
  - Summer (DST): UTC−04:00 (Eastern (EDT))
- ZIP Code: 08260
- Area code: 609
- FIPS code: 3400981200
- GNIS feature ID: 0885445
- Website: www.wildwoodcrest.org

Wildwood Crest is a borough in Cape May County, in the U.S. state of New Jersey. The borough, and all of Cape May County, is part of the Ocean City metropolitan statistical area, and is part of the Philadelphia metropolitan area. As of the 2020 United States census, the borough's population was 3,101, a decrease of 169 (−5.2%) from the 2010 census count of 3,270, which in turn reflected a decline of 710 (−17.8%) from the 3,980 counted in the 2000 census.

Wildwood Crest was incorporated as a borough by an act of the New Jersey Legislature on April 6, 1910, from portions of Lower Township. The area of the borough was first developed by Philip Baker in the 1910s as a southern extension to the resort of Wildwood. The borough's name comes from Wildwood, which in turn was named for the area's wild flowers.

It is a dry town, where alcohol cannot be sold, affirmed by the results of a referendum held in 1940. Wildwood Crest joins Cape May Point and Ocean City among municipalities in Cape May restricting the sale of alcohol. Adjoining Wildwood allows the sale of alcohol, including at bars on its boardwalk.

The borough was ranked the second-best beach in New Jersey in the 2008 "Top 10 Beaches Contest" sponsored by the New Jersey Marine Sciences Consortium. Wildwood Crest is one of five municipalities in the state that offer free public access to oceanfront beaches monitored by lifeguards, joining Atlantic City, North Wildwood, Wildwood and Upper Township's Strathmere section.

== History ==
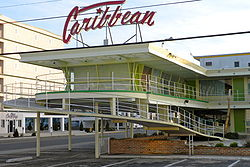
The Caribbean Motel, an architectural landmark of the "Doo Wop" era

The motels of Wildwood Crest are characterized by a distinctive "Doo Wop" or Googie style of architecture. Collectively, Wildwood and Wildwood Crest contain the nation's largest collection of mid-century "Doo Wop" resort architecture.

The term "Doo Wop" was coined by the Mid-Atlantic Center For The Arts in the early 1990s to describe the unique, space-age architectural style that was common in the 1950s and 1960s. Post World War II America was an optimistic, confident, and enthusiastic society. The new age style of architecture evolved into a showcase of colorful, flashy, modernistic architecture that captured the spirit of the times; it incorporated modern, sweeping angles, bright colors, starbursts, boomerang shapes, plastic palm trees, and angular wall and roof styles. "Doo Wop" was a celebration of the architecture, design, music, and pop culture of the 1950s and 1960s. During the 1950s, the economy had grown to unprecedented levels. Americans achieved a level of prosperity they had never known before. In response to this unprecedented growth, hundreds of motels were constructed in Wildwood and Wildwood Crest with the distinct "Doo Wop" style of architecture. The first motel to reflect this style was the Ebb Tide Motel, constructed in 1957, which was designed and built by Will and Lou Morey, who specialized in such designs.

Several "Doo Wop" motels, such as the Caribbean Motel, are registered on the National Register of Historic Places. These properties are part of the Wildwoods Shore Resort Historic District, a district listed on the National Register of Historic Places that collectively recognizes Wildwood Crest's concentration of mid-20th century Doo-Wop resort architecture. In recent years, historic "Doo Wop" motels have been demolished to make way for the construction of condominiums, leading to organized efforts to preserve the remaining examples.

Wildwood Crest and its neighboring towns of Wildwood, North Wildwood, and West Wildwood make up "The Wildwoods" resort, a popular vacation destination for those living in all parts of New Jersey as well as the Philadelphia and New York City metropolitan areas. Many vacationers and tourists have come from as far away as, New England and Canada and have made The Wildwoods a vacation hotspot, due to the area's mild summer climate. Unlike its sister communities of Wildwood and North Wildwood, Wildwood Crest does not have the all-hours excitement that the rest of the resort area is known for.

In recent years, condominiums have replaced many of the motels the area was known for, such as The Grand, The Ocean Breeze, El Coronado, and The Arcadia. Changes in housing have significantly changed the demographics of this area, from being a more family oriented one-vacation-per-summer place (for the middle class) to being a weekend retreat for wealthier families. It is a common vacation destination for New Jersey families.

== Geography ==
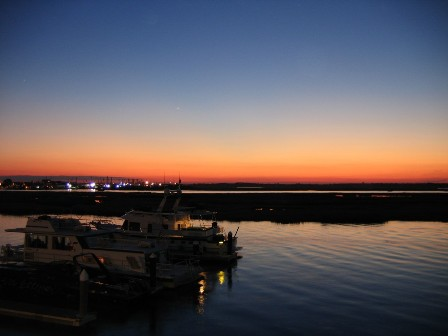
The back bay of Wildwood Crest at sunset

According to the United States Census Bureau, the borough had a total area of 1.48 square miles (3.84 km^{2}), including 1.30 square miles (3.36 km^{2}) of land and 0.19 square miles (0.48 km^{2}) of water (12.50%).

Part of the borough's beachfront has been closed off for the protection of native birds such as the piping plover. These small birds have this area all to themselves so that their eggs may be protected from beachgoers. There is a nature trail one may take through the dunes to explore this sheltered area of the beach.

Wildwood Crest borders the Diamond Beach section of Lower Township to the south, the City of Wildwood to the north, and the Atlantic Ocean.

== Demographics ==
Historical population
| Census | Pop. | Note | %± |
|---|---|---|---|
| 1910 | 103 | | — |
| 1920 | 161 | | 56.3% |
| 1930 | 738 | | 358.4% |
| 1940 | 661 | | −10.4% |
| 1950 | 1,772 | | 168.1% |
| 1960 | 3,011 | | 69.9% |
| 1970 | 3,483 | | 15.7% |
| 1980 | 4,149 | | 19.1% |
| 1990 | 3,631 | | −12.5% |
| 2000 | 3,980 | | 9.6% |
| 2010 | 3,270 | | −17.8% |
| 2020 | 3,101 | | −5.2% |
| 2023 (est.) | 3,063 | ▼ | −1.2% |
Population sources: 1900–2000 1900–1920; 1900–1910 1910–1930; 1940–2000 2000; 2010 2020

=== 2020 census ===
As of the 2020 census, Wildwood Crest had a population of 3,101.

The median age was 56.3 years. 13.5% of residents were under the age of 18 and 32.0% were 65 years of age or older. For every 100 females there were 92.7 males, and for every 100 females age 18 and over there were 90.7 males age 18 and over.

100.0% of residents lived in urban areas, while 0.0% lived in rural areas.

There were 1,473 households, of which 17.4% had children under the age of 18 living in them. Of all households, 45.3% were married-couple households, 19.6% were households with a male householder and no spouse or partner present, and 30.3% were households with a female householder and no spouse or partner present. About 35.7% of all households were made up of individuals and 18.6% had someone living alone who was 65 years of age or older.

There were 5,491 housing units, of which 73.2% were vacant. The homeowner vacancy rate was 1.3% and the rental vacancy rate was 19.5%.

Racial composition as of the 2020 census
| Race | Number | Percent |
|---|---|---|
| White | 2,788 | 89.9% |
| Black or African American | 42 | 1.4% |
| American Indian and Alaska Native | 12 | 0.4% |
| Asian | 26 | 0.8% |
| Native Hawaiian and Other Pacific Islander | 0 | 0.0% |
| Some other race | 74 | 2.4% |
| Two or more races | 159 | 5.1% |
| Hispanic or Latino (of any race) | 192 | 6.2% |

=== 2010 census ===
The 2010 United States census counted 3,270 people, 1,532 households, and 918 families in the borough. The population density was 2,884.0 per square mile (1,113.5/km^{2}). There were 5,569 housing units at an average density of 4,911.6 per square mile (1,896.4/km^{2}). The racial makeup was 93.18% (3,047) White, 1.68% (55) Black or African American, 0.15% (5) Native American, 1.01% (33) Asian, 0.00% (0) Pacific Islander, 1.80% (59) from other races, and 2.17% (71) from two or more races. Hispanic or Latino of any race were 5.63% (184) of the population.

Of the 1,532 households, 18.7% had children under the age of 18; 44.6% were married couples living together; 11.2% had a female householder with no husband present and 40.1% were non-families. Of all households, 35.4% were made up of individuals and 18.0% had someone living alone who was 65 years of age or older. The average household size was 2.13 and the average family size was 2.73.

16.6% of the population were under the age of 18, 6.7% from 18 to 24, 19.6% from 25 to 44, 30.7% from 45 to 64, and 26.4% who were 65 years of age or older. The median age was 49.8 years. For every 100 females, the population had 96.2 males. For every 100 females ages 18 and older there were 92.9 males.

The Census Bureau's 2006–2010 American Community Survey showed that (in 2010 inflation-adjusted dollars) median household income was $46,111 (with a margin of error of +/− $13,652) and the median family income was $67,917 (+/− $15,113). Males had a median income of $49,567 (+/− $20,496) versus $54,250 (+/− $12,982) for females. The per capita income for the borough was $40,032 (+/− $8,687). About 8.1% of families and 11.6% of the population were below the poverty line, including 13.2% of those under age 18 and 5.2% of those age 65 or over.

=== 2000 census ===
As of the 2000 U.S. census, there were 3,980 people, 1,833 households, and 1,114 families residing in the borough. The population density was 3,453.9 inhabitants per square mile (1,333.6/km^{2}). There were 4,862 housing units at an average density of 4,219.3 per square mile (1,629.1/km^{2}). The racial makeup of the borough was 94.87% White, 1.23% African American, 0.10% Native American, 0.48% Asian, 2.21% from other races, and 1.11% from two or more races. Hispanic or Latino of any race were 4.22% of the population.

There were 1,833 households, out of which 20.7% had children under the age of 18 living with them, 45.7% were married couples living together, 11.3% had a female householder with no husband present, and 39.2% were non-families. 34.6% of all households were made up of individuals, and 18.2% had someone living alone who was 65 years of age or older. The average household size was 2.17 and the average family size was 2.76.

In the borough, the population was spread out, with 18.2% under the age of 18, 5.9% from 18 to 24, 23.8% from 25 to 44, 26.6% from 45 to 64, and 25.5% who were 65 years of age or older. The median age was 47 years. For every 100 females, there were 87.2 males. For every 100 females age 18 and over, there were 84.4 males.

The median income for a household in the borough was $36,579, and the median income for a family was $47,462. Males had a median income of $42,727 versus $27,500 for females. The per capita income for the borough was $23,741. About 4.4% of families and 6.0% of the population were below the poverty line, including 1.1% of those under age 18 and 6.9% of those age 65 or over.

== Economy ==
Portions of the borough—together with areas in North Wildwood, West Wildwood and Wildwood—are part of a joint Urban Enterprise Zone (UEZ), one of 32 zones covering 37 municipalities statewide. The four municipalities in The Wildwoods were selected in 2002 as one of a group of three zones added to participate in the program as part of a joint zone with. In addition to other benefits to encourage employment and investment within the Zone, shoppers can take advantage of a reduced 3.3125% sales tax rate (half of the 6 5/8% rate charged statewide) at eligible merchants. Established in September 2002, the borough's Urban Enterprise Zone status expires in December 2023. The joint UEZ is overseen by the Enterprise Zone Development Corporation of the Wildwoods Board, which includes representatives from all four municipalities.

Notable motels in Wildwood Crest include the Caribbean Motel, built in 1957 in the Doo-Wop style and added to the National Register of Historic Places on August 24, 2005.

== Parks and recreation ==
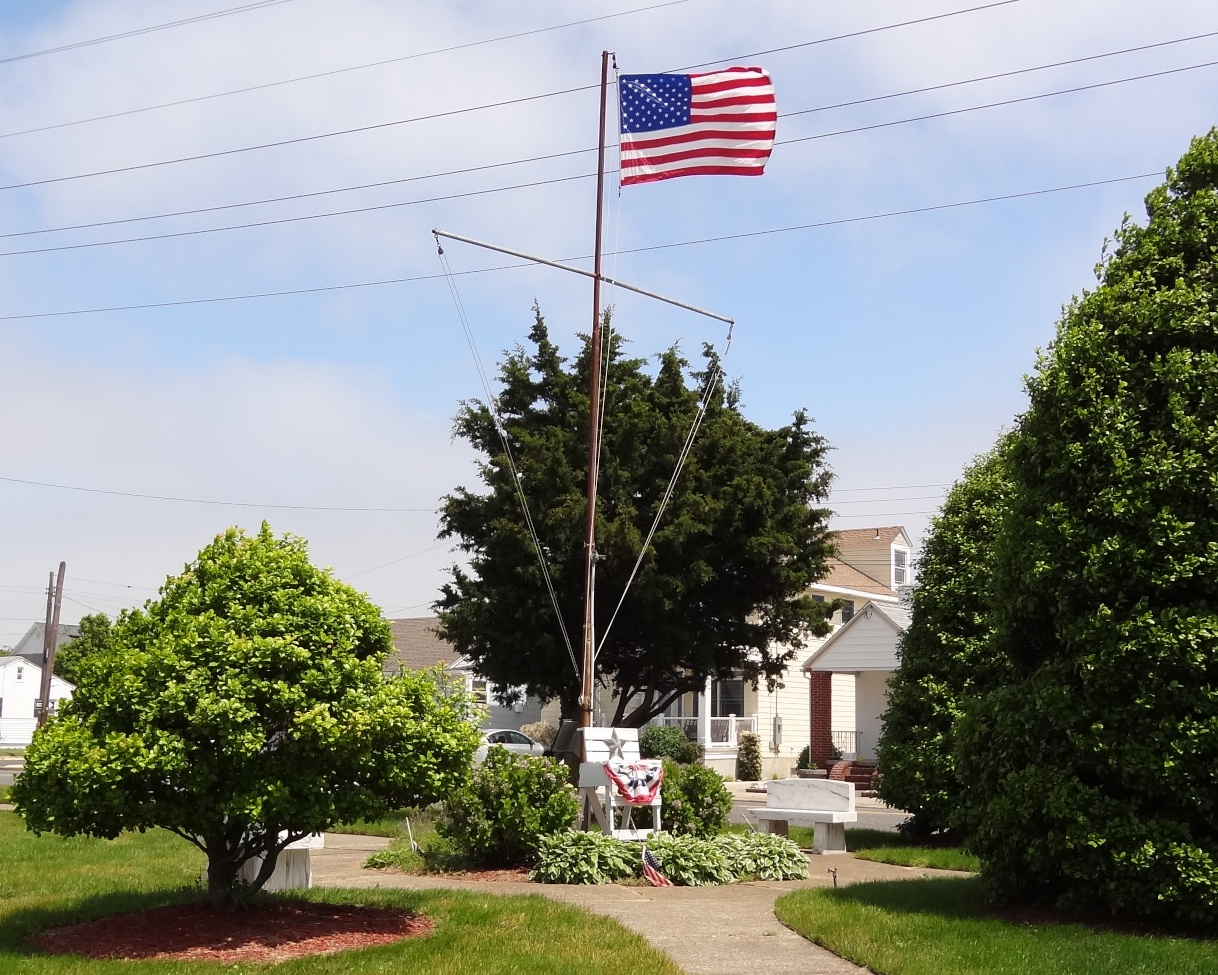
The Battle of Turtle Gut Inlet memorial in Wildwood Crest to the seamen and officers of the Brigantine Nancy

The borough is bordered on the bay side by Sunset Lake. This was once connected to the Atlantic Ocean by Turtle Gut Inlet, which was closed in 1922. The Sunset Lake and Turtle Gut Park is located at New Jersey and Miami Avenues. A nearby memorial commemorates the Battle of Turtle Gut Inlet fought on June 29, 1776. This was the only American Revolutionary War battle fought in Cape May County.

== Government ==
=== Local government ===
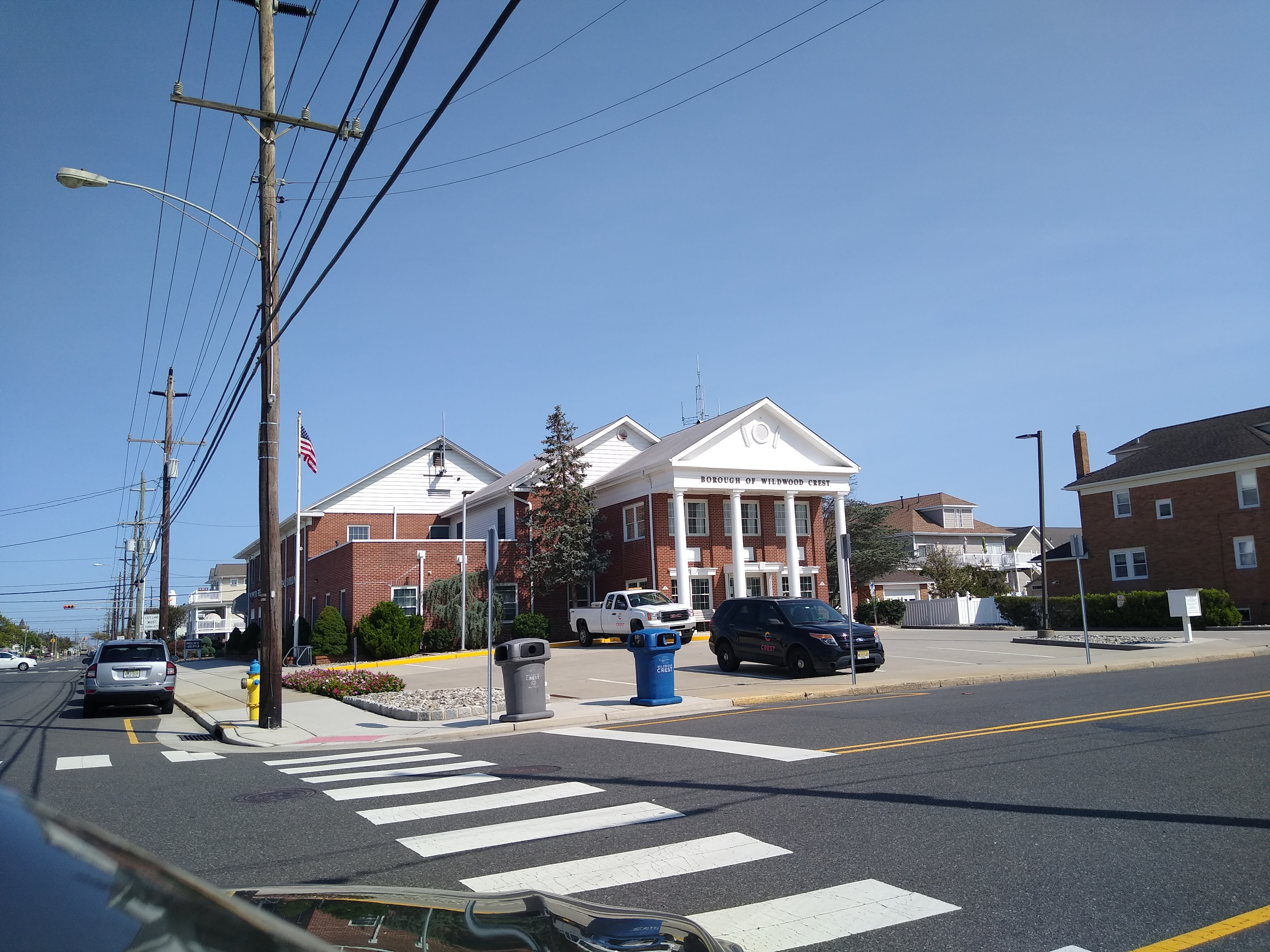
Wildwood Crest Borough Hall

Wildwood Crest has been governed under the Walsh Act, by a three-member commission, since 1937. The borough is one of 30 municipalities (of the 564) statewide that use the commission form of government. The governing body is comprised of three commissioners, who are elected at-large on a non-partisan basis to serve concurrent four-year terms of office, with the vote taking place as part of the November general election. At a reorganization conducted after each election, the commission selects one of its members to serve as mayor and gives each commissioner an assigned department to oversee and operate. As part of an effort to reduce the costs of conducting a standalone election for commissioners and to generate greater participation from voters, the election for borough commissioners was shifted from May to November by an ordinance passed in 2012, with the first November election held in 2013.

As of 2023, the Board of Commissioners consists of Mayor Don Cabrera (Commissioner of Public Works, Parks and Public Property), Deputy Mayor Joseph Franco Jr. (Commissioner of Revenue and Finance) and Joseph Schiff (Commissioner of Public Safety), all serving concurrent terms of office ending December 31, 2025.

=== Federal, state, and county representation ===
Wildwood Crest is located in the 2nd Congressional District and is part of New Jersey's 1st state legislative district.

For the 119th United States Congress, New Jersey's 2nd congressional district is represented by Jeff Van Drew (R, Dennis Township). New Jersey is represented in the United States Senate by Democrats Cory Booker (Newark, term ends 2027) and Andy Kim (Moorestown, term ends 2031).

For the 2026–2027 session, the 1st legislative district of the New Jersey Legislature is represented in the State Senate by Mike Testa (R, Vineland) and in the General Assembly by Antwan McClellan (R, Ocean City) and Erik K. Simonsen (R, Lower Township).

Cape May County is governed by a five-person Board of County Commissioners whose members are elected at-large on a partisan basis to three-year terms of office on a staggered basis, with either one or two seats coming up for election each year; At an annual reorganization held each January, the commissioners select one member to serve as director and another to serve as vice-director. As of 2026, Cape May County's Commissioners are Director Leonard C. Desiderio (R, Sea Isle City, term as commissioner ends December 31, 2027; term as director ends 2026), Vice-Director Andrew Bulakowski (R, Lower Township; term as commissioner ends 2028; term as vice-director ends 2026). Robert Barr (R, Ocean City; 2028) and Will Morey (R, Wildwood Crest; 2026), with one seat expiring in December 2026 vacant after Melanie Collette resigned from office in March 2026. The county's constitutional officers are Clerk Rita Marie Rothberg (R, Ocean City; 2030), Sheriff Robert Nolan (R, Lower Township; 2026) and Surrogate E. Marie Hayes (R, Ocean City; 2028).

=== Politics ===
As of March 2011, there were a total of 2,341 registered voters in Wildwood Crest, of which 436 (18.6%) were registered as Democrats, 1,052 (44.9%) were registered as Republicans and 850 (36.3%) were registered as Unaffiliated. There were 3 voters registered as Libertarians or Greens.

Gubernatorial election results for Wildwood Crest
| Year | Republican | | Democratic | | Third party(ies) | |
| Year | No. | % | No. | % | No. | % |
|---|---|---|---|---|---|---|
| 2025 | 1,057 | 64.61% | 570 | 34.84% | 9 | 0.55% |
| 2021 | 982 | 66.53% | 484 | 32.79% | 10 | 0.68% |
| 2017 | 796 | 61.04% | 477 | 36.58% | 31 | 2.38% |
| 2013 | 920 | 77.38% | 249 | 20.94% | 20 | 1.68% |
| 2009 | 806 | 61.48% | 436 | 33.26% | 69 | 5.26% |
| 2005 | 663 | 54.61% | 520 | 42.83% | 31 | 2.55% |

In the 2012 presidential election, Republican Mitt Romney received 61.1% of the vote (1,046 cast), ahead of Democrat Barack Obama with 38.5% (659 votes), and other candidates with 0.4% (6 votes), among the 1,724 ballots cast by the borough's 2,419 registered voters (13 ballots were spoiled), for a turnout of 71.3%. In the 2008 presidential election, Republican John McCain received 59.2% of the vote (1,090 cast), ahead of Democrat Barack Obama, who received 39.6% (729 votes), with 1,842 ballots cast among the borough's 2,319 registered voters, for a turnout of 79.4%. In the 2004 presidential election, Republican George W. Bush received 60.4% of the vote (1,203 ballots cast), outpolling Democrat John Kerry, who received around 38.4% (766 votes), with 1,993 ballots cast among the borough's 2,644 registered voters, for a turnout percentage of 75.4.

Presidential elections results
| Year | Republican | Democratic |
|---|---|---|
| 2024 | 63.0% 1,160 | 35.1% 647 |
| 2020 | 61.9% 1,237 | 36.5% 729 |
| 2016 | 65.5% 1,137 | 31.5% 546 |
| 2012 | 61.1% 1,046 | 38.5% 659 |
| 2008 | 59.2% 1,090 | 39.6% 729 |
| 2004 | 60.4% 1,203 | 38.4% 766 |

In the 2013 gubernatorial election, Republican Chris Christie received 77.4% of the vote (920 cast), ahead of Democrat Barbara Buono with 20.9% (249 votes), and other candidates with 1.7% (20 votes), among the 1,233 ballots cast by the borough's 2,410 registered voters (44 ballots were spoiled), for a turnout of 51.2%. In the 2009 gubernatorial election, Republican Chris Christie received 60.8% of the vote (806 ballots cast), ahead of both Democrat Jon Corzine with 32.9% (436 votes) and Independent Chris Daggett with 4.5% (59 votes), with 1,325 ballots cast among the borough's 2,448 registered voters, yielding a 54.1% turnout.

United States Senate election results for Wildwood Crest1
| Year | Republican | | Democratic | | Third party(ies) | |
| Year | No. | % | No. | % | No. | % |
|---|---|---|---|---|---|---|
| 2024 | 1,133 | 64.27% | 615 | 34.88% | 15 | 0.85% |
| 2018 | 911 | 66.11% | 426 | 30.91% | 41 | 2.98% |
| 2012 | 887 | 57.26% | 638 | 41.19% | 24 | 1.55% |
| 2006 | 786 | 61.07% | 483 | 37.53% | 18 | 1.40% |

United States Senate election results for Wildwood Crest2
| Year | Republican | | Democratic | | Third party(ies) | |
| Year | No. | % | No. | % | No. | % |
|---|---|---|---|---|---|---|
| 2020 | 1,177 | 61.49% | 703 | 36.73% | 34 | 1.78% |
| 2014 | 634 | 66.60% | 309 | 32.46% | 9 | 0.95% |
| 2013 | 401 | 62.56% | 237 | 36.97% | 3 | 0.47% |
| 2008 | 911 | 57.30% | 651 | 40.94% | 28 | 1.76% |

== Education ==
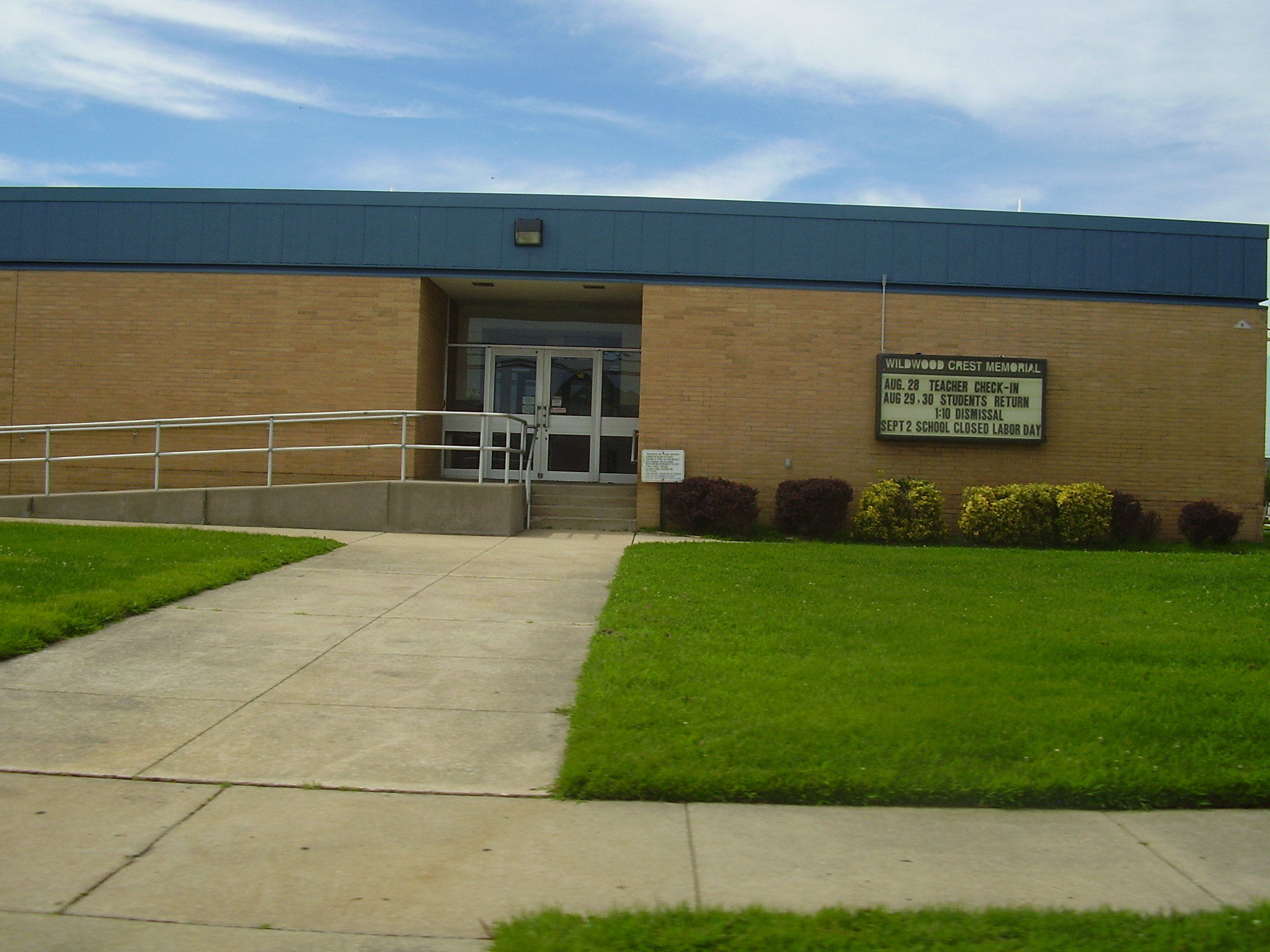
Wildwood Crest Memorial School

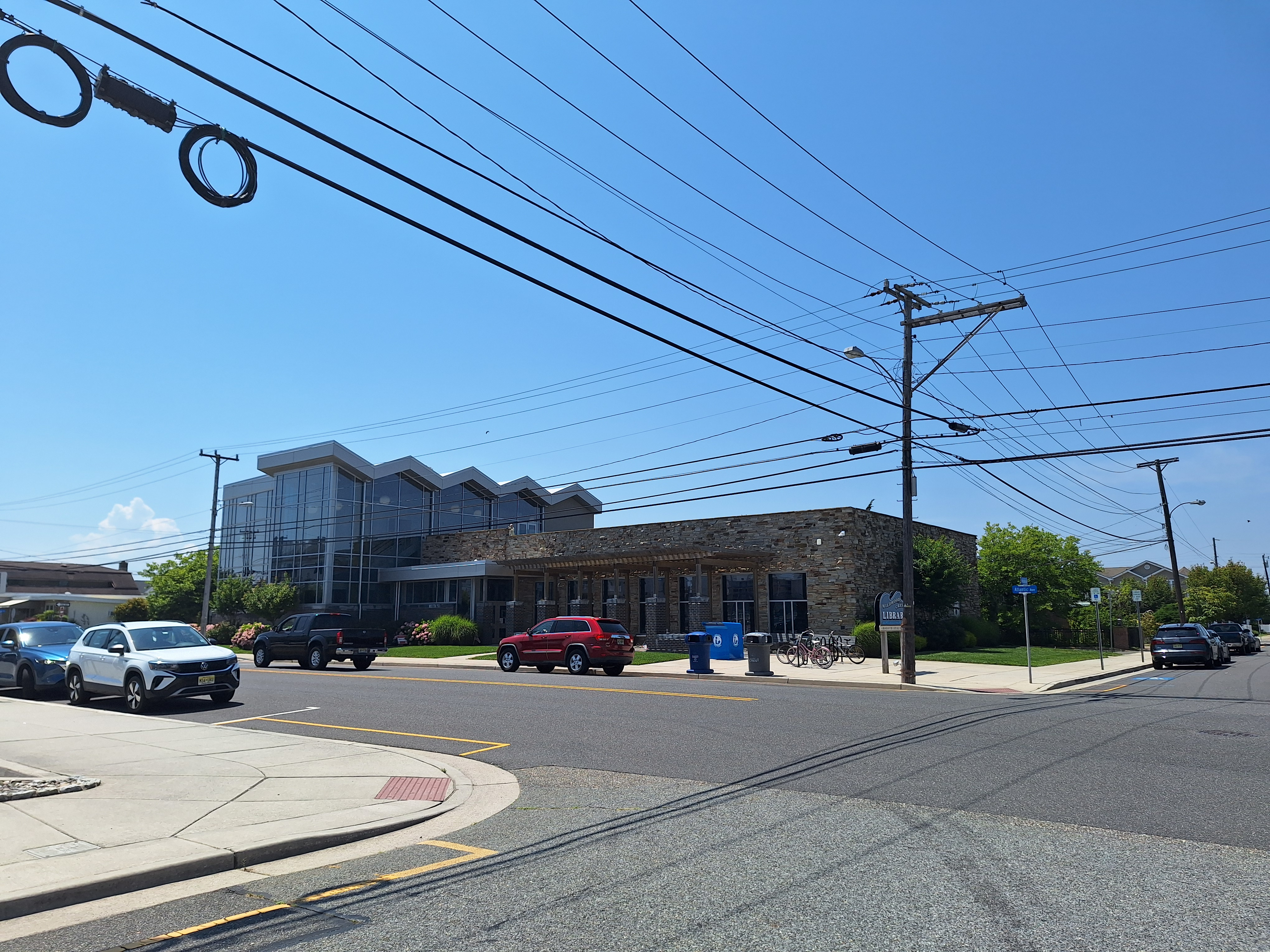
Wildwood Crest Library

The Wildwood Crest School District serves public school students in pre-kindergarten through eighth grade at Crest Memorial School. As of the 2023–24 school year, the district, comprised of one school, had an enrollment of 230 students and 34.4 classroom teachers (on an FTE basis), for a student–teacher ratio of 6.7:1.

For ninth through twelfth grades, public school students from Wildwood Crest attend Wildwood High School in Wildwood as part of a sending/receiving relationship with the Wildwood Public School District, together with students from North Wildwood and West Wildwood. As of the 2023–24 school year, the high school had an enrollment of 255 students and 24.6 classroom teachers (on an FTE basis), for a student–teacher ratio of 10.4:1.

Students are also eligible to attend Cape May County Technical High School in the Cape May Court House area, which serves students from the entire county in its comprehensive and vocational programs, which are offered without charge to students who are county residents. Special needs students may be referred to Cape May County Special Services School District in the Cape May Court House area.

Wildwood Catholic Academy in North Wildwood (prior to 2020 it was two separate schools: Cape Trinity Catholic elementary school and Wildwood Catholic High School) operates under the auspices of the Roman Catholic Diocese of Camden.

Cape May County Library operates the Wildwood Crest Library.

== Transportation ==
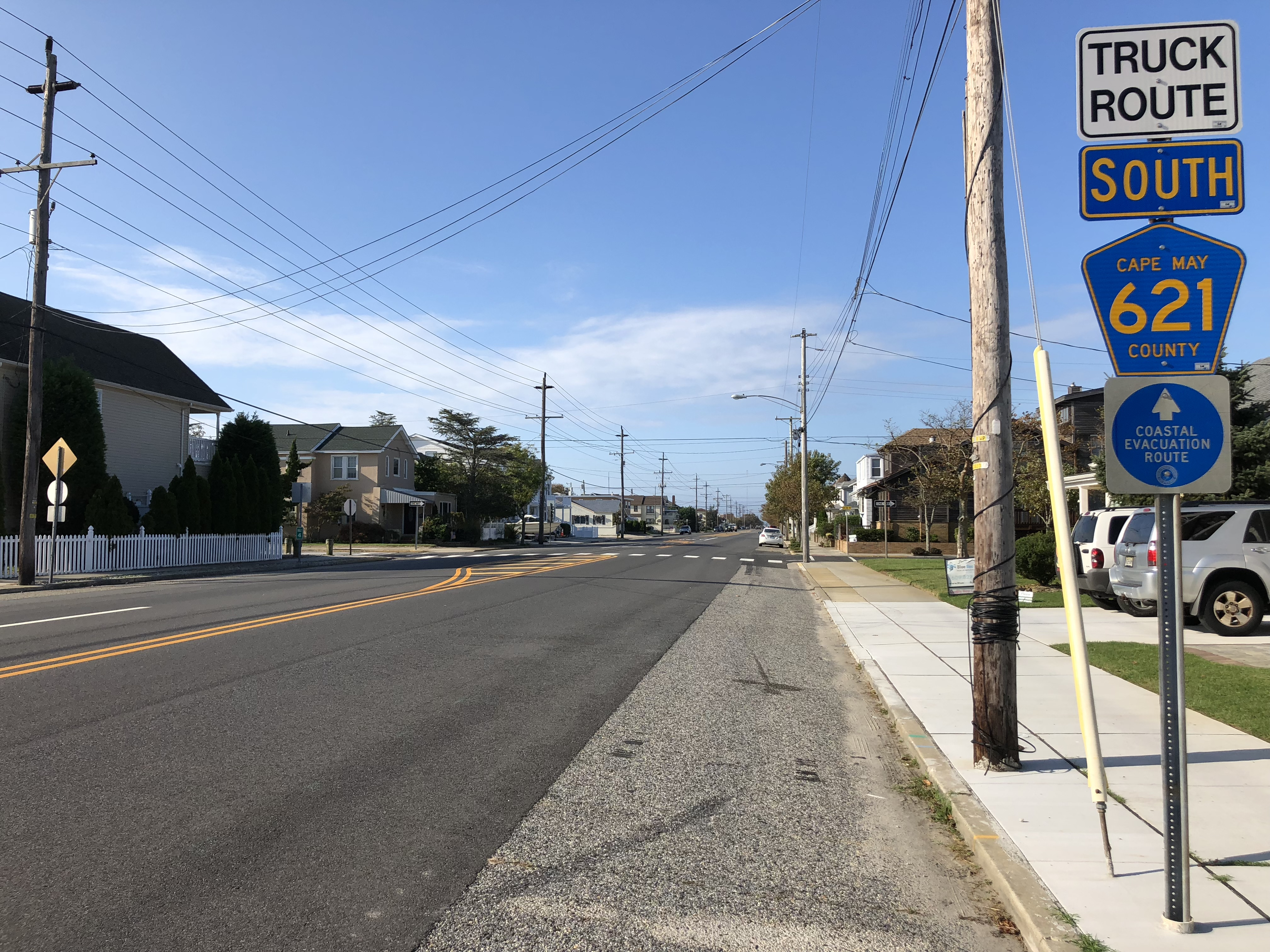
CR 621 in Wildwood Crest

=== Roads and highways ===
The borough has a total of 31.88 miles (51.31 km) of roadways, of which 29.83 miles (48.01 km) were maintained by the municipality and 2.05 miles (3.30 km) by Cape May County.

County Route 621 (Pacific Avenue/New Jersey Avenue) runs for 2.0 miles (3.2 km) through the borough, from Lower Township to the south to Wildwood in the north.

Parking in the beach area of Wildwood Crest is regulated by parking meters between mid-May and mid-September.

=== Public transportation ===
NJ Transit provides bus service to Philadelphia on the 313 and 315 routes, with seasonal service to Philadelphia on the 316 route and to the Port Authority Bus Terminal in Midtown Manhattan on the 319 route.

The Great American Trolley Company operates trolley service in Wildwood Crest during the summer months. The company runs a trolley route that provides service from Wildwood Crest to the boardwalk at Schellenger Avenue in Wildwood daily during the evening hours. The Great American Trolley Company also runs trolley service to the Irish Fall Festival in North Wildwood, with a route connecting Wildwood Crest to the festival site during the weekend of the festival.

== Landmarks ==
- Crest Fishing Pier
- Sunset Lake

== Religion ==
Notre Dame de la Mer Catholic Parish, of the Roman Catholic Diocese of Camden has a worship site in Wildwood Crest active in the summer. Previously it was a standalone church, Assumption Church. In 2008 the diocese announced that it would merge into St. Ann's Church of Wildwood, and the merger occurred in 2010.

== Climate ==
According to the Köppen climate classification system, Wildwood Crest has a humid subtropical climate (Cfa) with hot, moderately humid summers, cool winters and year-around precipitation. Cfa climates are characterized by all months having an average mean temperature above 32.0 °F (0.0 °C), at least four months with an average mean temperature at or above 50.0 °F (10.0 °C), at least one month with an average mean temperature at or above 71.6 °F (22.0 °C) and no significant precipitation difference between seasons. During the summer months in Wildwood Crest, a cooling afternoon sea breeze is present on most days, but episodes of extreme heat and humidity can occur with heat index values at or above 95.0 °F (35.0 °C). During the winter months, episodes of extreme cold and wind can occur with wind chill values below 0.0 °F (−17.8 °C). The plant hardiness zone at Wildwood Crest Beach is 7b with an average annual extreme minimum air temperature of 6.8 °F (−14.0 °C). The average seasonal (November–April) snowfall total is 12 to 18 inches (30 to 46 cm), and the average snowiest month is February which corresponds with the annual peak in nor'easter activity.

Climate data for Wildwood Crest Beach, NJ (1981–2010 Averages)
| Month | Jan | Feb | Mar | Apr | May | Jun | Jul | Aug | Sep | Oct | Nov | Dec | Year |
|---|---|---|---|---|---|---|---|---|---|---|---|---|---|
| Mean daily maximum °F (°C) | 41.9 (5.5) | 43.7 (6.5) | 50.4 (10.2) | 59.4 (15.2) | 68.7 (20.4) | 77.9 (25.5) | 82.9 (28.3) | 81.7 (27.6) | 76.2 (24.6) | 66.2 (19.0) | 56.2 (13.4) | 46.6 (8.1) | 62.7 (17.1) |
| Daily mean °F (°C) | 34.9 (1.6) | 36.7 (2.6) | 43.1 (6.2) | 52.2 (11.2) | 61.3 (16.3) | 70.7 (21.5) | 75.9 (24.4) | 74.9 (23.8) | 68.9 (20.5) | 58.3 (14.6) | 48.8 (9.3) | 39.5 (4.2) | 55.5 (13.1) |
| Mean daily minimum °F (°C) | 27.9 (−2.3) | 29.7 (−1.3) | 35.8 (2.1) | 44.9 (7.2) | 53.8 (12.1) | 63.6 (17.6) | 68.9 (20.5) | 68.1 (20.1) | 61.6 (16.4) | 50.4 (10.2) | 41.3 (5.2) | 32.4 (0.2) | 48.3 (9.1) |
| Average precipitation inches (mm) | 3.36 (85) | 2.82 (72) | 4.16 (106) | 3.63 (92) | 3.60 (91) | 3.19 (81) | 3.79 (96) | 4.10 (104) | 3.29 (84) | 3.61 (92) | 3.25 (83) | 3.62 (92) | 42.42 (1,077) |
| Average relative humidity (%) | 66.9 | 66.2 | 64.4 | 63.0 | 67.1 | 71.7 | 70.7 | 73.3 | 70.2 | 68.8 | 68.0 | 67.4 | 68.2 |
| Average dew point °F (°C) | 25.0 (−3.9) | 26.5 (−3.1) | 31.9 (−0.1) | 40.0 (4.4) | 50.3 (10.2) | 61.1 (16.2) | 65.7 (18.7) | 65.8 (18.8) | 58.8 (14.9) | 48.1 (8.9) | 38.7 (3.7) | 29.6 (−1.3) | 45.2 (7.3) |
Source: PRISM

Climate data for North Cape May, NJ Ocean Water Temperature (7 W Wildwood Crest)
| Month | Jan | Feb | Mar | Apr | May | Jun | Jul | Aug | Sep | Oct | Nov | Dec | Year |
|---|---|---|---|---|---|---|---|---|---|---|---|---|---|
| Daily mean °F (°C) | 37 (3) | 37 (3) | 42 (6) | 50 (10) | 59 (15) | 68 (20) | 73 (23) | 74 (23) | 72 (22) | 61 (16) | 52 (11) | 42 (6) | 56 (13) |
Source: NOAA

== Ecology ==
According to the A. W. Kuchler U.S. potential natural vegetation types, Wildwood Crest would have a dominant vegetation type of Northern Cordgrass (73) with a dominant vegetation form of Coastal Prairie (20).

== Notable people ==
People who were born in, residents of, or otherwise closely associated with Wildwood Crest include:

- J. Thompson Baker (1847–1919), one of the original developers of Wildwood and Wildwood Crest, who was also a politician who represented New Jersey's 2nd congressional district from 1913 to 1915
- Kenneth A. Black Jr. (1932–2019), politician who served in the New Jersey General Assembly from District 3A from 1968 to 1974
- Aliki Brandenberg (born 1929), children's literature author
- John F. Callinan (1935-2025), judge of the New Jersey Superior Court
- Joe Maloy (born 1985), professional triathlete
- Bill Osborn (born c. 1966), football scout and color analyst who played in the National Football League, World League and the Arena Football League
- Bernie Parent (1945–2025), goalie for the Boston Bruins, Toronto Maple Leafs and most notably Philadelphia Flyers where he back-stopped the team to two consecutive Stanley Cups
- Frank Vogel (born 1973), head coach of the Phoenix Suns

== Gallery ==
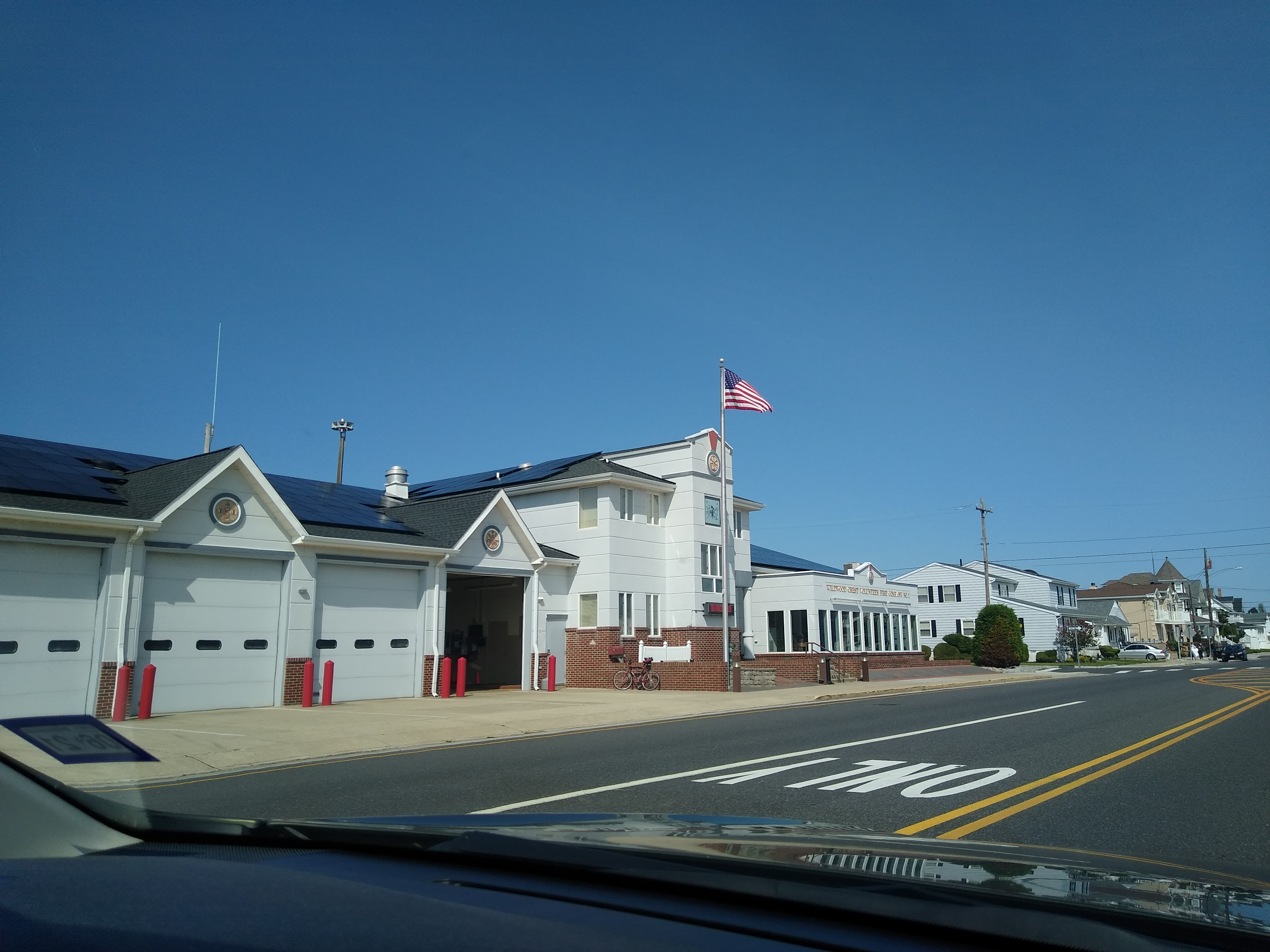
Fire Station

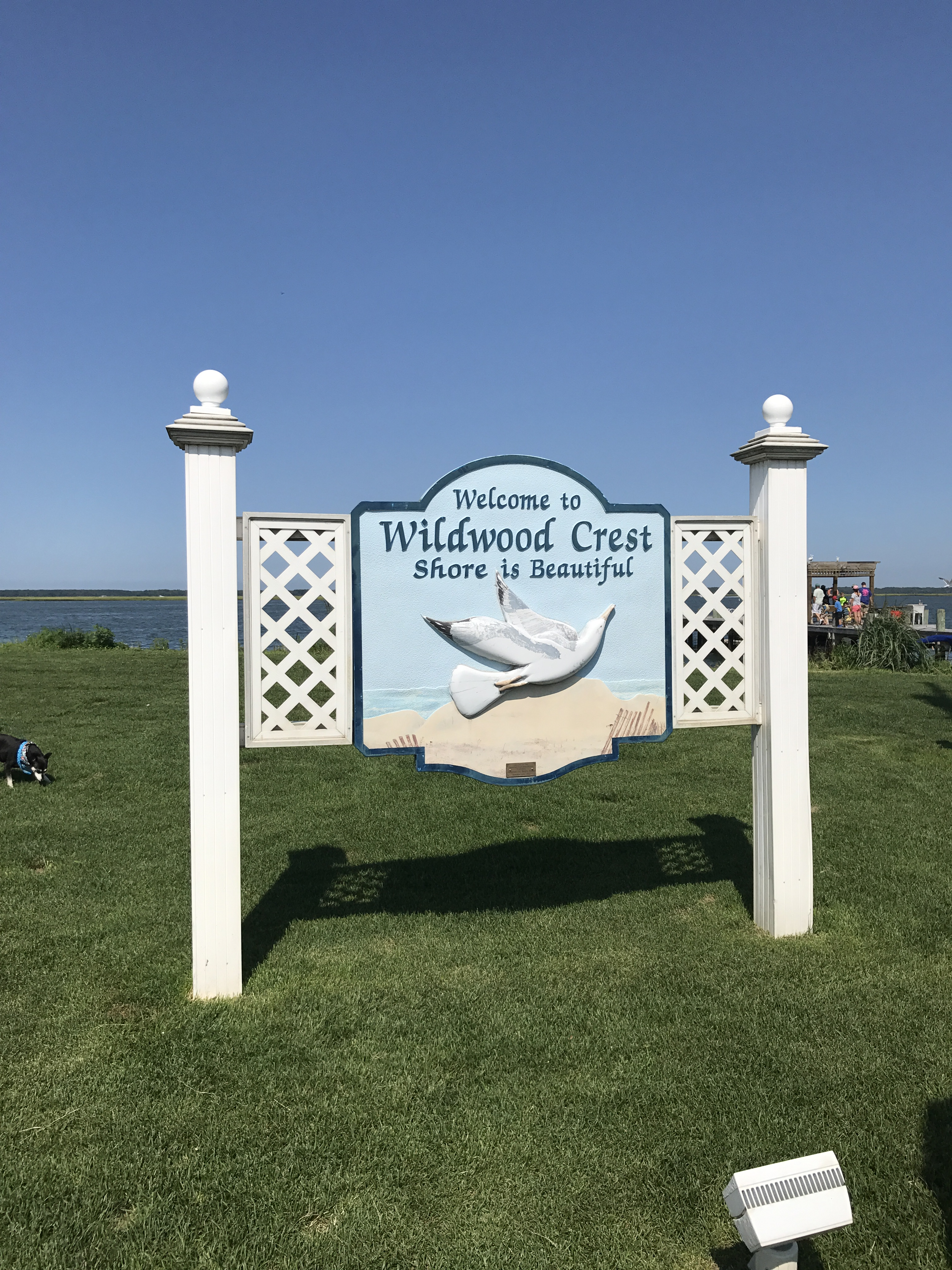
"Shore is Beautiful"

| Preceded by Wildwood | Beaches of New Jersey | Succeeded by Diamond Beach |
