= Serge Provost (statistician) =

Canadian statistician

Serge B. Provost

Academic background
- Education: McGill University
- Thesis: Distribution Problems Connected with the Multivariate Linear Functional Relationship Models (1984)
- Doctoral advisor: Arak Mathai

Academic work
- Institutions: University of Western Ontario

Serge Bédard Provost is a full professor in the Department of Statistical and Actuarial Sciences at the University of Western Ontario.

== Education and career ==
Provost obtained his Ph.D. degree in Mathematics and Statistics from McGill University in 1984 under the supervision of Arak Mathai.

Provost's research focuses on multivariate analysis, orthogonal series expansions, statistical modelling, complex and matrix-variate distribution theory, computational statistics and pure mathematics; for instance, they involve applications in biostatistics, financial modelling, actuarial science, operations research, time series analysis, data visualization, geometric probability, microarray experimentation, optics, life testing, environmental studies, thermodynamics, and machine learning. He has authored or co-authored approximately 140 articles. As well, he is the co-author of four books. Parenthetically, the website of the latest one which is 'Open Access', has been accessed 90,000 times between October 2022 and December 2024.

Among other distinctions, Provost is a Fellow and Chartered Statistician of the Royal Statistical Society. He is the recipient of three teaching award (2005, 2008, 2010). Along with one of his doctoral students, he received the 1996 Jacob Wolfowitz Prize for an innovative paper on the distribution of the serial correlation coefficient. He became an Associate of the Society of Actuaries in 1980.

== Books ==
- Mathai, A. M.; Provost, Serge B.; Hayakawa, Takesi (1995). Bilinear Forms and Zonal Polynomials. New York, NY: Springer New York. doi:10.1007/978-1-4612-4242-0_2. ISBN 978-1-4612-4242-0. OCLC 852789931.
- Mathai, A. M.; Provost, Serge B.; Haubold, H.J. (2022). Multivariate statistical analysis in the real and complex domains. Cham. doi:10.1007/978-3-030-95864-0_13. ISBN 978-3-030-95864-0. OCLC 1347381548.
- Mathai, A. M.; Provost, Serge B. (1992). Quadratic forms in random variables : theory and applications. New York: M. Dekker. ISBN 0-8247-8691-2. OCLC 24953650.
- Saboor, Abdus; Provost, Serge B.; Ahmad, Munir (2010). Univariate and Bivariate Gamma-Type Distributions. Lambert Academic Publishing. ISBN 978-3838345536.

== Selected publications ==
- Provost, Serge B.; Ha, Hyung-Tae (2015-06-29). "Distribution approximation and modelling via orthogonal polynomial sequences". Statistics: 1–17. doi:10.1080/02331888.2015.1053809. ISSN 0233-1888.
- Jiang, Min; Provost, Serge B. (2014-03-04). "A hybrid bandwidth selection methodology for kernel density estimation". Journal of Statistical Computation and Simulation. 84 (3): 614–627. doi:10.1080/00949655.2012.721366. ISSN 0094-9655.
- Mathai, Arak M.; Provost, Serge B. (2022-07-04). "On the singular gamma, Wishart, and beta matrix-variate density functions". Canadian Journal of Statistics. 50 (4): 1143–1165. doi:10.1002/cjs.11710. ISSN 0319-5724.
- Provost, Serge B.; Yang, Zhaoqi; Ahmed, S. Ejaz (June 2022). "Securing Density Estimates via Smooth Moment-Based Empirical Distribution Function Approximants". Journal of the Indian Society for Probability and Statistics. 23 (1): 1–18. doi:10.1007/s41096-022-00119-4. ISSN 2364-9569.
- Provost, Serge B. and Rudiuk, Edmund M. (1995). The Sampling Distribution of the Serial Correlation Coefficient American Journal of Mathematical and Management Sciences 15 (1-2), 57-81. https://doi.org/10.1080/01966324.1995.10737387
