= Agros, Cyprus =

Agros Αγρός Ağros
- Village
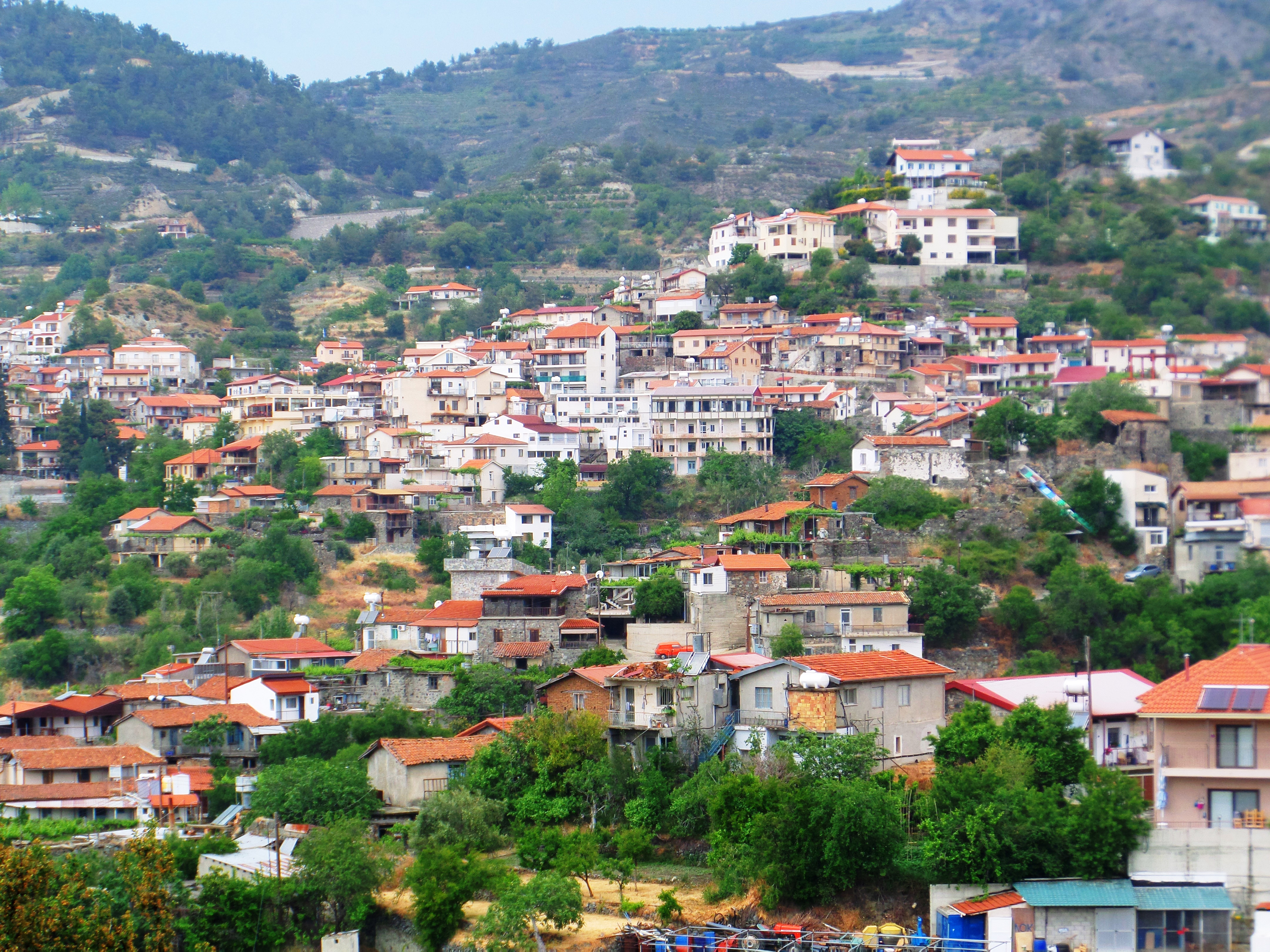
- View of Agros

- Location in Cyprus
- Coordinates: 34°55′N 33°1′E
- Country: Cyprus
- District: Limassol District

Government
  - Agros Mayor: Michalis Constantinides
  - Agros Community Council: Members: Antonis Tsolakis; Sofoklis Agathokleous; Petros Kyriakou; Andreas Latzias; Niki Kafkalia; Charis Papachristoforou
- Elevation: 1,100 m (3,600 ft)

Population (2011)
  - Total: 804
  - Demonym: Agrotes
- Time zone: UTC+2 (EET)
  - Summer (DST): UTC+3 (EEST)
- PostCode: 4860
- Website: www.agros.org.cy

Agros (Greek: Αγρός, Turkish: Ağros) is a village built on the Troödos Mountains, in the region of Pitsilia, in southwest Cyprus, which has built amphitheatrically among high mountains at an altitude of 1100 metres with a population of approximately 1,000. The village is located 45 minutes away from the cities of Nicosia and Limassol, 20 minutes from Troodos Square and 80 minutes from the international airports of Larnaca and Paphos.

Agros was named after the Monastery of Megalos Agros.

== Climate ==
Climate data for Agros (2002-2018)
Month	Jan	Feb	Mar	Apr	May	Jun	Jul	Aug	Sep	Oct	Nov	Dec	Year
Record high °C (°F)	—	—	—	—	—	—	—	37.7 (99.9)	39.6 (103.3)	—	—	—	39.6 (103.3)
Mean daily maximum °C (°F)	7.8 (46.0)	8.8 (47.8)	11.6 (52.9)	16.2 (61.2)	20.8 (69.4)	25.7 (78.3)	28.4 (83.1)	28.8 (83.8)	24.7 (76.5)	20.0 (68.0)	15.2 (59.4)	10.2 (50.4)	18.2 (64.7)
Mean daily minimum °C (°F)	1.8 (35.2)	1.6 (34.9)	4.1 (39.4)	6.8 (44.2)	10.7 (51.3)	15.0 (59.0)	17.6 (63.7)	18.2 (64.8)	14.7 (58.5)	11.0 (51.8)	7.3 (45.1)	3.8 (38.8)	9.4 (48.9)
Average rainfall mm (inches)	145.8 (5.74)	117 (4.6)	83.7 (3.30)	43.2 (1.70)	31 (1.2)	15.6 (0.61)	14.1 (0.56)	11.8 (0.46)	7.1 (0.28)	41.3 (1.63)	62 (2.4)	144.1 (5.67)	716.7 (28.15)
Average rainy days	12	11	9	5	3	3	2	2	2	5	7	12	73
Average relative humidity (%)	69	66	67	67	67	68	71	72	64	62	65	71	67
Mean daily sunshine hours	6	7	8	9	11	12	13	12	11	9	8	6	9
Source 1: Weather Atlas
Source 2: Μετερεωλογική Υπηρεσία Κύπρου

== 2005 Helvetia Cup ==
The 2005 Helvetia Cup or 2005 European B Team Championships in badminton was held from 19 to 23 January in Agros, Cyprus. The 23rd Balkan Mathematical Olympiad was held in Agros, Cyprus from 27 April to 3 May 2006.

== International relations ==
=== Twin towns – sister cities ===
Agros is a member of the Douzelage, a town twinning association of 28 towns across the European Union. This active town twinning began in 1991 and there are regular cultural exchange events.

- Altea, Spain – 1991
- Bad Kötzting, Germany – 1991
- Bellagio, Italy – 1991
- (Republic of Ireland) Bundoran, Ireland – 1991
- Granville, France – 1991
- Holstebro, Denmark – 1991
- Houffalize, Belgium – 1991
- Meerssen, the Netherlands – 1991
- Niederanven, Luxembourg – 1991
- Preveza, Greece – 1991
- Sesimbra, Portugal – 1991
- Sherborne, United Kingdom – 1991
- Oxelösund, Sweden – 1998
- Judenburg, Austria – 1999
- Chojna, Poland – 2004
- Kőszeg, Hungary – 2004
- Sigulda, Latvia – 2004
- Sušice, Czech Republic – 2004
- Türi, Estonia – 2004
- Zvolen, Slovakia – 2007
- Rokiškis, Lithuania – 2018
- Marsaskala, Malta – 2009
- Siret, Romania – 2010
- Škofja Loka, Slovenia – 2011
- Tryavna, Bulgaria – 2011
- Asikkala, Finland –
- Rovinj, Croatia –

== Gallery ==
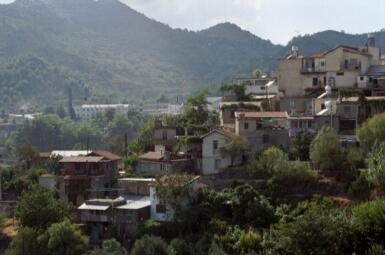
Agros

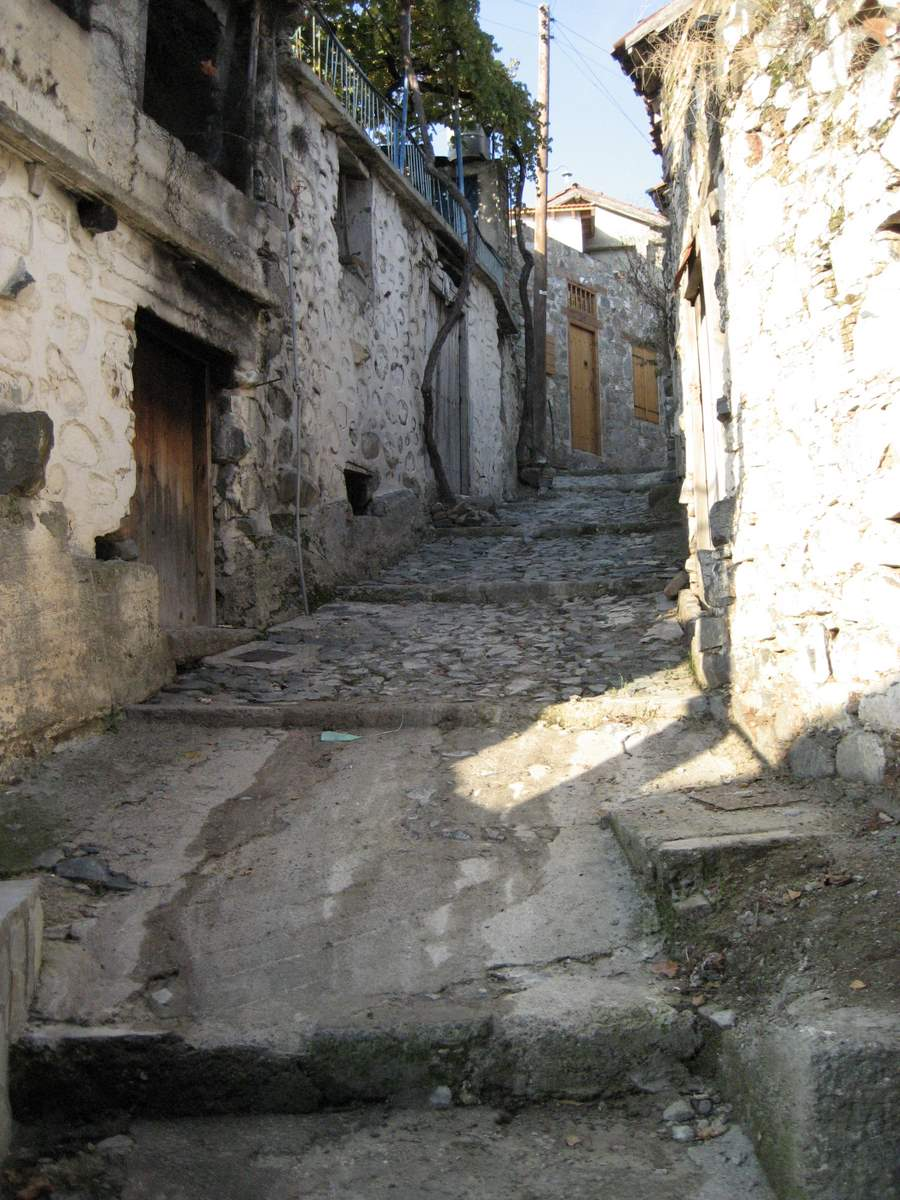
Traditional neighborhood

Snowy landscape in Agros

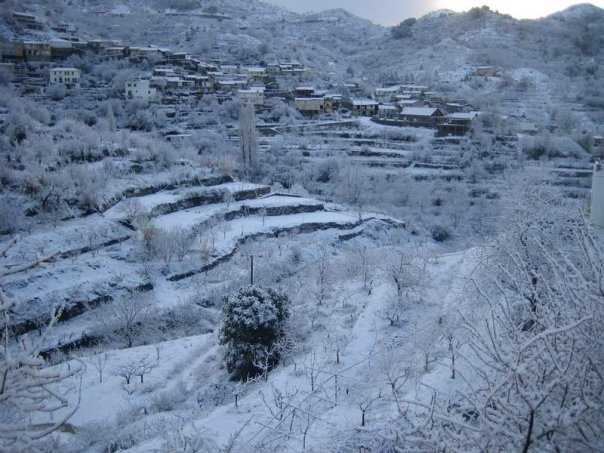
