= CMSS =

CMSS may refer to:

- Centre for Military, Security and Strategic Studies, University of Calgary
- Creative MultiSpeaker Surround, an EAX technology first introduced by Creative Labs in the Sound Blaster Audigy
- Classical Music Satellite Service, a satellite radio service available from the Public Radio Satellite System
- CMSS, a variant of the Merkle signature scheme

== See also ==
- CMS (disambiguation)
