= Cyprus Mathematical Society =

Mathematical society in Cyprus

The Cyprus Mathematical Society (CMS) aims to promote the mathematical education and science. It was founded in 1983. The C.M.S. is a non-profit organization supported by the voluntary work of its members. The C.M.S. counts over 600 members. In order to promote its aims, C.M.S. organizes Mathematical competition between students all over Cyprus, and takes part in international mathematics competitions (BMO, Junior BMO competition, PMWC, IMO). CMS organize a series of mathematics competitions as part of the selection process of the national teams in the international mathematics competitions and the Cyprus Mathematical Olympiad. The new selection process is described below.

== High School (Lyceum) competitions ==
As of 2005, in Cyprus Four provincial competitions are held in November in every district capital. In Lefkosia is called Iakovos Patatsos, in Lemesos is called Andreas Vlamis, in Larnaka and Ammochostos is called Petrakis Kyprianou and in Pafos is called Andreas Hadjitheoris. Every grade has different problems. Afterwards ten high-school (Lyceum) students from every grade (1st, 2nd and 3rd grade) of every district are selected.
Total: 4 districts * 3 grades * 10 students = 120 students.

Then a National (Pancyprian) competition is held in December and is called "Zeno". Every grade still has different problems. Afterwards ten students from every grade are selected.
Total: 3 grades * 10 students = 30 students.
These student are usually divided into two groups according to the district they come from.

Each group watches about eight to ten four-hour preparation lessons for the olympiad. During the lessons Four Team Selection Tests are held which are considered the four parts of the Selection Competition above 15.5 and are called Euclides. All the student have the same test. In each of the competition five students are eliminated. So after the fourth competition the six member of national team for IMO and BMO and the four runners-up are selected.

- In every competition or test there are four problem usually covering geometry, number theory, algebra, and combinatorics (elementary level) and last four hours each.

== Junior high-school (Gymnasium) competitions ==
Four provincial competitions are also held in November in every district capital which have the same name as above. Afterwards 10 junior high-school (Gymnasium) students from every grade (1st, 2nd and 3rd grade) from every district are selected.
Total: 4 districts * 3 grades * 10 students = 120 students.

Then a National (Pancyprian) competition is held in December and is called "Evagoras Pallikaridis". Every grade has different problems. Afterwards 10 students from every grade are selected.
Total: 3 grades * 10 students = 30 students.
This student are usually divide into two groups according to the district they come from.

Each group watches about ten to twelve-four hour preparing lessons for the olympiad. During the lessons Four Team Selection Tests are held which are considered the four parts of the Selection Competition under 15.5 and are called Euclides. All the student have the same test. In each of the competition 5 students are eliminated. So after the 4th competition the six member of national team for Junior BMO and the four runners-up are selected.

- In every competition or test there are four problem usually covering geometry, number theory, algebra, and combinatorics (elementary level) and last four hours each.

== Publications ==
The main publication of the CMS is the Mathematic Step (Greek: Μαθηματικό Βήμα).

Other publications:

- Mediterranean Journal for Research in Mathematics Education from January 2002

== See also ==
- European Mathematical Society
- List of Mathematical Societies
