= Crest Fishing Pier =

Pier in New Jersey, United States

Coordinates: 38.9736°N 74.8232°W

Crest Pier
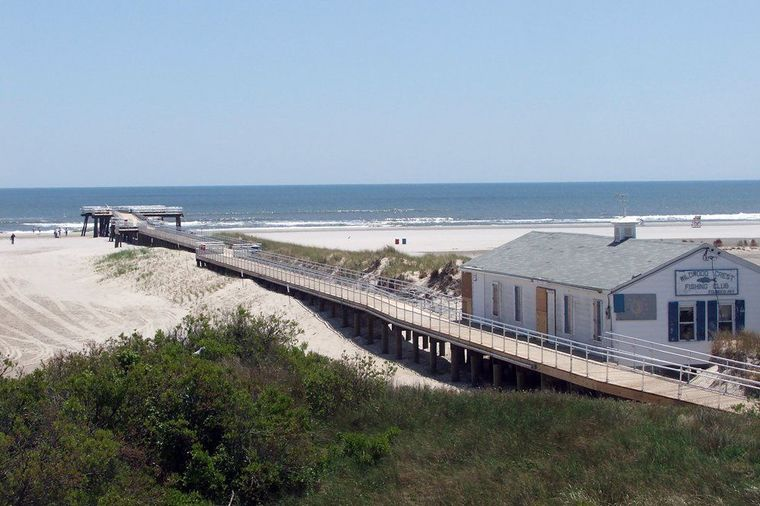
- Spans: Atlantic Ocean
- Official name: Wildwood Crest Fishing Club

Characteristics
- Total length: 1,010 feet (310 m)

History
- Opening date: 1919

The Crest Pier is a municipal pier located within the city of Wildwood Crest, New Jersey. The pier is located at Heather Road and Boardwalk. The Wildwood Crest Fishing Club owned and operated the pier for more than 85 years. In 2006, ownership was transferred to the Borough of Wildwood Crest.

== Renovations ==
Due to the outward sweeping shape of the island, the beaches of Wildwood Crest accumulate massive amounts of sand from the northern barrier islands. Consequently, the beaches of Wildwood Crest grow about 20 feet in width each year. Since the construction of the pier, the beach has grown increasingly longer. The pier has been lengthened two separate times in order to extend its platform into the sea.

In 2008, the aging pier was renovated and made handicapped accessible. The borough paid $670,000 for the renovations and the state Department of Community Affairs provided a $400,000 grant.

In 2014, the unused and dilapidated fishing clubhouse, which was covered in asbestos and hazardous materials, was demolished and replaced with a wooden deck that includes several picnic tables.

Plans have been proposed for future renovations, including lengthening the pier, leasing space to vendors, and constructing a pavilion.
