= Centre for Mathematical Sciences =

Centre for Mathematical Sciences may refer to:

- Centre for Mathematical Sciences (Cambridge)
- Centre for Mathematical Sciences (Kerala), India
- International Centre for Mathematical Sciences, Edinburgh, UK
