= CM.com =

Mobile services company formerly called ClubMessage

- Trade name: CM.com
- Formerly: CM Telecom, ClubMessage B.V.
- Type: Public
- ISIN: NL0013746431
- Industry: Mobile services
- Founded: 1999
- Headquarters: Breda, Netherlands
- Website: cm.com

| CM.com (formerly called CM Telecom) is a mobile service that provides software for direct messaging, VoIP messaging, ecommerce payments and digital identification. The company was formed in 1999 and is based in the Netherlands.

== History ==
The company was originally established as ClubMessage in 1999 by Jeroen van Glabbeek and Gilbert Gooijers. During the next couple of years, the company focused on the expansion of its SMS messaging service, creating and patenting its "MailText" software.

In September 2013, CM.com acquired Dutch mobile app developer OneSixty Mobile B.V. with offices in 's-Hertogenbosch and London, enabling its initial physical presence in the UK.

In early 2015, it was announced that the company would be opening offices in both Paris and London. During the same year, CM expanded to media messaging managing push message campaigns, where companies or app developers can measure and drive interaction with their users, and launched CM Payments Worldwide, a global payments provider.

CM.com was the main sponsor of football club NAC Breda from 2015 to 2020.

In March 2016, CM.com acquired Global messaging, which was based in Peterborough, England. Around the same time, the company also acquired the mobile app developer, Service2Media.

In July 2017, CM.com took over payment institution Docdata Payments from its American owner Ingram Micro. In the same month, the company revealed a new visual identity, logo and name change.

== Market & products ==
As part of the instant messaging market, the CM has predominantly focused on backend solutions. The Mobile service company and others similar have been at the forefront of mobile messaging solutions over the last decade, and the rise of what is often referred to as the messaging economy.

In 2016, they launched a real-time analytics tool for mobile. The web tool provides insights in messaging traffic and conversions to customers.
