= Wildwood Crest School District =

School district in Cape May County, New Jersey, US

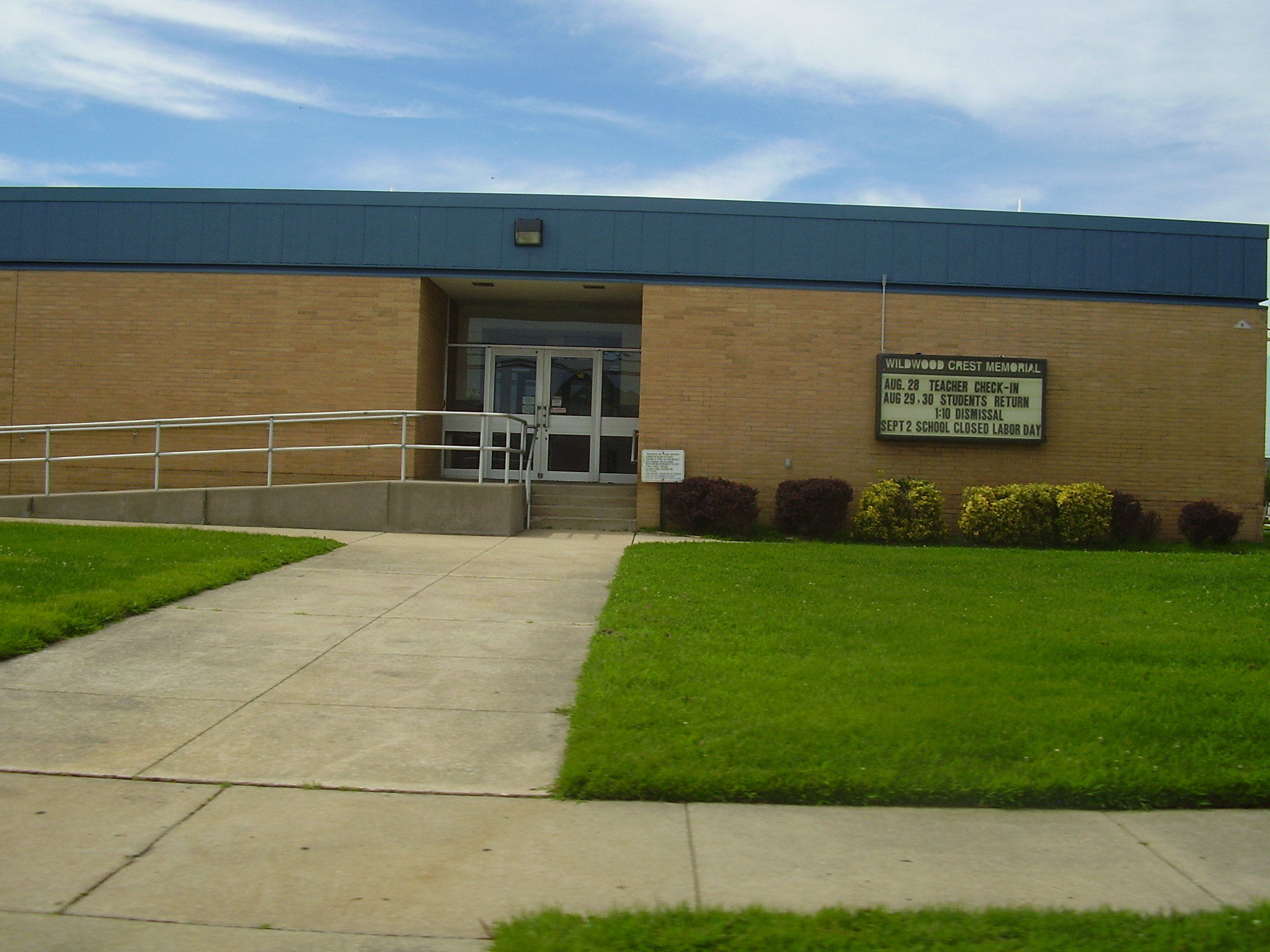
- Wildwood Crest Memorial School

Address
- 9100 Pacific Avenue Wildwood Crest, Cape May County, New Jersey, 08260; United States
- Coordinates: 38.963462°N 74.849467°W

District information
- Grades: PreK-8
- Superintendent: David J. Del Conte Jr.
- Business administrator: James Lushok
- Schools: 1

Students and staff
- Enrollment: 230 (as of 2023–24)
- Faculty: 34.4 FTEs
- Student–teacher ratio: 6.7:1

Other information
- District Factor Group: B
- Website: www.crestmem.edu
| Ind. | Per pupil | District spending | Rank (*) | K-8 average | %± vs. average |
|---|---|---|---|---|---|
| 1A | Total Spending | $25,598 | 66 | $18,891 | 35.5% |
| 1 | Budgetary Cost | 21,163 | 65 | 14,159 | 49.5% |
| 2 | Classroom Instruction | 11,904 | 63 | 8,659 | 37.5% |
| 6 | Support Services | 4,238 | 65 | 2,167 | 95.6% |
| 8 | Administrative Cost | 1,136 | 3 | 1,547 | −26.6% |
| 10 | Operations & Maintenance | 3,440 | 67 | 1,612 | 113.4% |
| 13 | Extracurricular Activities | 396 | 63 | 104 | 280.8% |
| 16 | Median Teacher Salary | 60,551 | 46 | 61,136 |
Data from NJDoE 2014 Taxpayers' Guide to Education Spending. *Of K-8 districts with up to 400 students. Lowest spending=1; Highest=71

The Wildwood Crest School District is a public school district that serves students in pre-kindergarten through eighth grade from Wildwood Crest, in Cape May County, in the U.S. state of New Jersey.

As of the 2023–24 school year, the district, comprised of one school, had an enrollment of 230 students and 34.4 classroom teachers (on an FTE basis), for a student–teacher ratio of 6.7:1.

For ninth through twelfth grades, public school students from Wildwood Crest attend Wildwood High School in Wildwood as part of a sending/receiving relationship with the Wildwood Public School District, together with students from North Wildwood and West Wildwood. As of the 2023–24 school year, the high school had an enrollment of 255 students and 24.6 classroom teachers (on an FTE basis), for a student–teacher ratio of 10.4:1.

== History ==
The district had been classified by the New Jersey Department of Education as being in District Factor Group "B", the second-lowest of eight groupings. District Factor Groups organize districts statewide to allow comparison by common socioeconomic characteristics of the local districts. From lowest socioeconomic status to highest, the categories are A, B, CD, DE, FG, GH, I and J.

In 2025, the district used artificial intelligence software to develop individualized learning materials for students, including many students whose families are renters who live in the borough before moving elsewhere.

== School ==
Crest Memorial School serves students in grades PreK–8. The school had an enrollment of 267 students in the 2019–20 school year.

- Lawrence Lhulier, principal

== Administration ==
Core members of the district's administration are:

- David J. Del Conte Jr., superintendent
- James Lushok, business administrator and board secretary

== Board of education ==
The district's board of education, comprised of five members, sets policy and oversees the fiscal and educational operation of the district through its administration. As a Type II school district, the board's trustees are elected directly by voters to serve three-year terms of office on a staggered basis, with either one or two seats up for election each year held (since 2012) as part of the November general election. The board appoints a superintendent to oversee the district's day-to-day operations and a business administrator to supervise the business functions of the district.

In 1936, voters reduced the number of board members from nine to five.
