= Balkan Mathematical Olympiad =

The Balkan Mathematical Olympiad (BMO) is an international contest of winners of high-school national competitions from European countries.

== Participants (incomplete) ==
- Albania
  - BMO 1991: 1.Julian Mulla 2.Erion Dasho 3.Elton Bojaxhi 4.Enkel Hysnelaj
  - BMO 1993: 1.Gjergji Guri 2.Jonada Rrapo 3.Ermir Qeli 4.Mirela Ciperiani 5.Gjergji Sugari 6.Pirro Bracka
  - BMO 1997 1.Alkid Ademi 2.Ermal Rexhepi 3.Aksel Bode 4.Gerard Gjonaj 5.Amarda Shehu
  - BMO 2002: 1.Deni Raco 2.Evarist Byberi 3.Arlind Kopliku 4.Kreshnik Xhangolli 5.Dritan Tako 6.Erind Angjeliu
  - BMO 2006: 1.Eni Duka 2.Erion Dula 3.Keler Marku 4.Klevis Ymeri 5.Anri Rembeci 6.Gjergji Zaimi
  - BMO 2008: 1.Tedi Aliaj 2.Sindi Shkodrani 3.Disel Spahia 4.Arbeg Gani 5.Arnold Spahiu
  - BMO 2009: 1.Andi Reci 2.Ridgers Mema 3.Arbana Grembi 4.Niko Kaso 5.Erixhen Sula 6.Ornela Xhelili
  - BMO 2010: 1.Andi Nika 2.Olsi Leka 3.Florida Ahmetaj 4.Ledio Bidaj 5.Endrit Shehaj 6.Fatjon Gerra
  - BMO 2011: 1.Florida Ahmetaj 2.Erjona Topalli 3.Keti Veliaj 4.Disel Spahija 5.Franc Hodo 6.Ridgers Mema
  - BMO 2012: 1.Boriana Gjura 2.Fatjon Gera 3.Erjona Topalli 4.Gledis Kallço 5.Florida Ahmetaj 6.Genti Gjika
  - BMO 2013: 1.Antonino Sota 2.Boriana Gjura 3.Ardis Cani 4.Gledis Kallço 5.Enis Barbullushi
  - BMO 2014: 1.Gent Gjika 2.Boriana Gjura 3.Gledis Kallço 4.Antonino Sota 5.Enis Barbullushi 6.Geri Shehu
  - BMO 2015: 1.Gledis Kallço 2.Ana Peçini 3.Alboreno Voci 4.Selion Haxhi 5.Naisila Puka 6.Enes Kristo
  - BMO 2016: 1.Gledis Kallço 2.Ana Peçini 3.Fjona Parllaku 5.Stefan Haxhillazi 5.Kevin Isufa 6.Barjol Lami
  - BMO 2016/Albania B: Laura Sheshi 2.Gledis Zeneli 3.Liana Shpani 4.Enea Prifti 5.Jovan Shandro 6.Aleksandros Ruci
  - BMO 2017: 1.Enea Prifti 2.Barjol Lami 3.Stefan Haxhillazi 4.Rei Myderrizi 5.Safet Hoxha 6.Lorenc Bushi
- Republic of North Macedonia
  - BMO 2001: 1.Ilija Jovceski 2.Todor Ristov 3.Kire Trivodaliev 4.Riste Gligorov 5.Zoran Dimov 6.Irina Panovska
  - BMO 2002: 1.Ilija Jovceski: Silver Medal (17 points); 2.Stojan Trajanovski: Bronze Medal (15 points); 3.Irina Panovska: Bronze Medal (8 points); 4.Vesna Stojanoska: Bronze Medal (7 points); 5.Zoran Dimov: /; 6.Trifun Karaevski: /;
  - BMO 2003: 1.Ilija Jovceski: Silver Medal (33 points); 2.Stojan Trajanovski: Bronze Medal (31 points); 3.Zoran Dimov: Bronze Medal (31 points); 4.Angel Stanoev: Bronze Medal (22 points); 5.Bojan Prangoski: Bronze Medal (20 points); 6.Marina Zaharieva: /;
  - BMO 2004: 1.Zoran Dimov 2. Ilinka Ivanoska 3. Vesna Kirandziska 4. Visar Zejnulahu 5. Jana Giceva 6. Riste Stojanov
  - BMO 2005: 1.Angel Stanoev 2.Alen Stojanov 3.Viktor Simjanoski 4.Ilinka Ivanovska 5.Vesna Kirandziska 6.Aleksandar Ilioski
  - BMO 2006: 1.Bodan Arsovski 2. Maja Taseska 3. Viktor Simjanovski 4. Aleksandar Ilioski 5. Visar Zejnulahu 6. Andrej Risteski
  - BMO 2007: 1.Bodan Arsovski 2.Viktor Simjanovski 3. Aleksandar Ilioski 4. Andrej Risteski 5. Matej Dobrevski 6.Vlatko Dimitrov
  - BMO 2008 team A: 1.Bodan Arsovski 2.Bojan Joveski 3.Dimitar Trenevski 4.Stefan Lozanovski 5.Matej Dobrevski 6.Kujtim Rahmani team B: 1.Predrag Gruevski 2.Zlatko Joveski 3.Filip Talimdzioski 4.Petar Filev 5.Andrej Risteski 6.Darko Domazetovski
  - BMO 2009: 1.Bodan Arsovski 2.Filip Talimdzioski 3.Bojan Joveski 4.Predrag Gruevski 5.Stefan Lozanovski 6.Stefan Stojcevski
  - BMO 2010: 1.Predrag Gruevski 2.Stefan Stojcevski 3.Zlatko Joveski 4.Bodan Arsovski 5.Binjamin Tekesanoski
  - BMO 2011: 1.Predrag Gruevski 2.Filip Stankovski 3.Stefan Stojcevski 4.Binjamin Tekesanoski 5.Vasil Kuzevski 6.Angela Josifovska
  - BMO 2012: 1.Stefan Stojcevski 2.Vasil Kuzevski 3.Aleksandar Momirovski 4.Filip Stankovski 5.Rosica Dejanovska 6.Marija Tepegjozova
  - BMO 2013: 1. Bojan Serafimov 2. Vasil Kuzevski 3. Jovan Tasev 4. Martin Josifovski 5. Antonij Mijoski 6. Nikola Grunchevski
  - BMO 2014: 1. Bojan Serafimov 2. Jovan Tasev 3. Teodora Bujaroska 4. Stefan Nikoloski 5. Andrej Ilievski 6. Bozhidar Stevanoski
  - BMO 2015: 1. Andrej Ilievski 2. Andrej Ivanov 3. Stefan Nikoloski 4. Sanja Simonovikj 5. Nikola Grunchevski 6. Bozhidar Stevanoski
  - BMO 2016: 1. Andrej Ivanov 2. Dragan Trajchev 3. Andrej Ilievski 4. Dimitar Bajraktarov 5. Sanja Simonovikj 6. Nikola Danevski
- Moldova
  - BMO 2009: 1.Gramatki Iulian 2.Guzun Ion 3.Ilasenco Andrei 4.Ivanov Andrei 5.Mogoreanu Dan 6. Zubarev Alexei
  - BMO 2010 team A: 1.Gramatki Iulian 2.Ilasenco Andrei 3.Zubarev Alexei 4.Indricean Mihai 5.Godina Teodor 6.Ivanov Andrei
  - BMO 2010 team B: 1.Boscanean Andrian 2.Pupazan Gheorghe 3.Grigoroi Alexandru 4.Sali Adrian 5.Cheian Dinis 6.Zbirnea Alexei
  - BMO 2011: 1.Cheian Dinis 2.Godina Teodor 3.Grigoroi Alexandru 4.Ivanov Andrei 5.Pupazan Gheorghe 6.Zanoci Cristian
- Romania
  - BMO 2010: 1.Pădurariu Tudor 2.Chindea Filip 3.Radu Bumbăcea 4.Drăgoi Octav 5.Cerrahoğlu Ömer 6.Ivanovici Ştefan
  - BMO 2011 team A: 1.Cerrahoğlu Ömer 2.Pădurariu Tudor 3.Drăgoi Octav 4.Radu Bumbăcea 5.Bud Viorel Andrei 6.Milu Alexandru Andrei
  - BMO 2011 team B: 1.Dănăilă Dan 2.Tiba Marius 3.Stanciu Ioan 4.Ivanovici Ştefan-Adrian 5.Tirc Sorin 6.Toma Florina
  - BMO 2012: 1.Cerrahoğlu Ömer 2.Tran Bach Hai 3.Drăgoi Octav 4.Ivanovici Ștefan 5.Spătaru Ștefan 6.Toma Florina
- Turkey
  - Turkey has not participated in BMO 2006
  - BMO 2007: 1.Burak Saglam 2.Melih Ucer 3.Semih Yavuz 4.Tugba Uzluer 5.Sureyya Emre Kurt 6.Cafer Tayyar Yildirim
  - BMO 2008: 1.Umut Varolgunes 2.Melih Ucer 3.Semih Yavuz 4.Omer Faruk Tekin 5.Alper Inecik 6.Fehmi Emre Kadan
  - BMO 2009: 1.Umut Varolgunes 2.Melih Ucer 3.Ufuk Kanat 4.Vefa Goksel 5.Sureyya Emre Kurt 6.Fehmi Emre Kadan
  - BMO 2010: 1.Ozan Yıldız 2.Melih Ucer 3.Ufuk Kanat 4.Mehmet Sönmez 5.Hikmet Yildiz 6.Polatkan Polat
  - BMO 2011: 1.Mehmet Efe Akengin 2.Yunus Emre Demirci 3.Ufuk Kanat 4.Polatkan Polat 5.Memhet Sönmez 6.Yiğit Yargıç
  - BMO 2012 team A: 1.Mehmet Efe Akengin 2.Yuni 3.Ufuk Kanat 4.Mehmet Sönmez 5.Berfin Simsek 6.Mehmet Akif Yildiz
  - BMO 2012 team B: 1.Eray Aydin 2.Mehmet Eren Durlanik 3.Fatih Kaleoglu 4.Muhammed İkbal Ulvi 5.Burak Varici 6.Orhan Tahir Yavascan
- Bosnia and Herzegovina
  - BMO 2012: 1. Harun Hindija: Gold Medal; 2. Ratko Darda: Silver Medal; 3. Hamza Merzić: Bronze Medal; 4. Vladimir Ivković: Honorable Mention; 5. Sead Delalić: Honorable Mention; 6. Ivan Bartulović: Honorable Mention.
- Bulgaria
  - BMO 1985: 1. Vasil Daskalov: Gold Medal; 2. Nikolay Chavdarov: Gold Medal; 3. Ivan Dimitrov: Gold Medal; 4. Marin Marinov: Silver Medal; 5. Ivaylo Nedelchev: Silver Medal; 6. Nikolay Mateev: Silver Medal.
  - BMO 1986: 1. Iliya Kraychev: Gold Medal; 2. Ivaylo Nedelchev: Gold Medal; 3. Nikolay Mateev: Gold Medal; 4. Ivaylo Kortezov: Gold Medal; 5. Vladimir Mihov: Silver Medal; 6. Zvezdelina Stankova: Silver Medal.
  - BMO 1987: 1. Vladimir Mihov: Gold Medal; 2. Ivaylo Kortezov: Gold Medal; 3. Alexander Grancharov: Gold Medal; 4. Desislava Bakardzhieva: Gold Medal; 5. Ivaylo Bakalov: Silver Medal; 6. Emanuil Atanasov: Silver Medal.
  - BMO 1988: 1. Desislava Bakardzhieva: Silver Medal; 2. Emanuil Atanasov: Gold Medal; 3. Krum Tsanev: Silver Medal; 4. Radoslav Bochev: Silver Medal; 5. Plamen Iliev: Gold Medal; 6. Emanuil Todorov: Silver Medal.
  - BMO 1989: 1. Plamen Iliev: Silver Medal; 2. Dobromir Dimitrov: Gold Medal; 3. Svetlozar Nestorov: Gold Medal; 4. Dimiter Grancharov: Gold Medal; 5. Yuri Dimitrov: Silver Medal; 6. Nikolay Stoev: Silver Medal.
  - BMO 1990: 1. Tihomir Asparuhov: Gold Medal; 2. Plamen Koev: Gold Medal; 3. Emanuil Todorov: Gold Medal; 4. Petar Dimov: Gold Medal; 5. Bozhko Bakalov: Gold Medal; 6. Gueorgui Nedev: Gold Medal.
  - BMO 1991: 1. Bozhko Bakalov: Silver Medal; 2. Gueorgui Nedev: Silver Medal; 3. Milen Yakimov: Gold Medal, 4. Dancho Danev: Silver Medal; 5. Nikolay Tsvetkov; 6. Avgustin Marinov.
  - BMO 1992: 1. Mladen Dimitrov: Gold Medal; 2. Stanislav Yordanov: Gold Medal; 3. Nikolay Nikolov: Gold Medal; 4. Martin Kasabov: Gold Medal; 5. Boris Dimitrov: Gold Medal; 6. Avgustin Marinov: Gold Medal.
  - BMO 1993: 1. Avgustin Marinov: Gold Medal; 2. Nikolay Nikolov: Gold Medal; 3. Mladen Dimitrov: Gold Medal; 4. Mariana Markova: Gold Medal; 5. Ivan Velev: Gold Medal; 6. Borislav Deyanov: Silver Medal.
  - BMO 1994: 1. Nikolay Nikolov: Gold Medal; 2. Mladen Dimitrov: Gold Medal; 3. Silvia Petrova: Silver Medal; 4. Yasen Siderov: Gold Medal; 5. Valentin Dimitrov: Silver Medal; 6. Detelin Dosev.
  - BMO 1996: 1. Lyudmila Kamenova: Gold Medal; 2. Ivan Ivanov: Silver Medal; 3. Dimitar Alexandrov: Silver Medal; 4. Rayko Chalkov: Silver Medal; 5. Stoyan Atanasov: Silver Medal; 6. Ivo Simeonov: Silver Medal.
  - BMO 1997: 1. Ivan Ivanov: Gold Medal; 2. Rayko Chalkov: Gold Medal; 3. Georgi Angelov: Gold Medal; 4. Dimitar Zhechev: Gold Medal; 5. Stoyan Atanasov: Silver Medal; 6. Kiril Sakaliyski: Silver Medal.
  - BMO 2008: 1. Tedi Aliaj: Silver Medal; 2. Svetozar Stankov: Gold Medal; 3. Disel Spahija: Bronze Medal; 4. Borislav Valkov: Silver Medal; 5. Galin Statev: Gold Medal; 6. Svetoslav Karaivanov: Silver Medal.
  - BMO 2009: 1. Lyuboslav Panchev: Silver Medal; 2. Svetozar Stankov: Gold Medal; 3. Martin Novakov: Bronze Medal; 4. Borislav Valkov: Silver Medal; 5. Galin Statev: Gold Medal; 6. Svetoslav Karaivanov: Silver Medal.
  - BMO 2010: 1. Lyuboslav Panchev: Gold Medal; 2. Zhivko Zhechev: Silver Medal; 3. Emil Lalov: Bronze Medal; 4. Viktor Valov: Silver Medal; 5. Kameliya Belcheva; 6. Alexandar Makelov: Gold Medal.
  - BMO 2011: 1. Viktor Valov: Silver Medal; 2. Zhivko Zhechev: Silver Medal; 3. Mladen Valkov: Silver Medal; 4. Slavcho Slavchev: Bronze Medal; 5. Bogdan Stankov: Silver Medal; 6. Kubrat Danailov: Gold Medal.
- Cyprus
  - In Cyprus four provincial competitions and a National (Pancyprian) competition are held every year. During this procedure, 30 students are selected and two Team Selection Tests are held to determine who will be the six national team members for BMO. In every competition or test there are four problem usually covering geometry, number theory, algebra, and combinatorics (elementary level) and last four and a half hours each.
- Greece
  - BMO 1990: 1. Dimitris Stathopoulos: Gold Medal; 2. Theodoros Evgeniou: Silver Medal; 3. Athanasios Tsikas: Silver Medal; 4. Andreas Stalidis: Bronze Medal; 5. Dimitris Karakostas: Bronze Medal; 6. Eleni Vlamou: Honorable Mention.
  - In Greece there are three competitions to select the national team: Those are: Θαλής (Thales) – first round; Ευκλείδης (Euclid) – second round and Αρχιμήδης (Archimedes) – third round
- Serbia
  - BMO 2011: 1.Teodor von Burg 2.Filip Zivanovic 3.Igor Spasojevic 4.Rade Spegar 5.Stefan Mihajlovic 6.Stevan Gajovic
- Montenegro
  - BMO 2011: 1.Radovan Krtolica: Silver Medal 2.Oleg Smiljanic 3.Olja Krastovic 4.Nikola Kovacevic 5.Beco Merulic 6.Aleksandar Dobrasinovic

== List of BMOs ==
- The 1st BMO was held in Athens, Greece in 1984.
- The 2nd BMO was held in Sofia, Bulgaria in 1985.
- The 3rd BMO was held in Bucharest, Romania in 1986.
- The 4th BMO was held in Athens, Greece in 1987.
- The 5th BMO was held in Nicosia, Cyprus in 1988.
- The 6th BMO was held in Split, Yugoslavia in 1989.
- The 7th BMO was held in Sofia, Bulgaria in 1990.
- The 8th BMO was held in Constanţa, Romania in 1991.
- The 9th BMO was held in Athens, Greece in 1992.
- The 10th BMO was held in Nicosia, Cyprus in 1993.
- The 11th BMO was held in Novi Sad, Yugoslavia in 1994.
- The 12th BMO was held in Plovdiv, Bulgaria in 1995.
- The 13th BMO was held in Bacău, Romania in 1996.
- The 14th BMO was held in Kalambaka, Greece on 28 April-4 May 1997.
- The 15th BMO was held in Nicosia, Cyprus on 3–9 May 1998.
- The 16th BMO was held in Ohrid, Republic of Macedonia on 6–12 May 1999.
- The 17th BMO was held in Chişinău, Moldova on 3–9 May 2000.
- The 18th BMO was held in Belgrade, Yugoslavia on 3–9 May 2001.
- The 19th BMO was held in Antalya, Turkey on 25 April-1 May 2002.
- The 20th BMO was held in Tirana, Albania on 2–8 May 2003.
- The 21st BMO was held in Pleven, Bulgaria on 5–11 May 2004.
- The 22nd BMO was held in Iaşi, Romania on 4–10 May 2005.
- The 23rd BMO was held in Agros, Cyprus on 27 April-3 May 2006.
- The 24th BMO was held in Rhodes, Greece on 26 April-2 May 2007.
- The 25th BMO was held in Ohrid, Republic of Macedonia on 4–10 May 2008.
- The 26th BMO was held in Kragujevac, Serbia on 28 April-4 May 2009.
- The 27th BMO was held in Chișinău, Moldova on 2–8 May 2010.
- The 28th BMO was held in Iaşi, Romania on 4–8 May 2011.
- The 29th BMO was held in Antalya, Turkey on 26 April-2 May 2012.
- The 30th BMO was held in Agros, Cyprus on 28 June – 3 July 2013.
- The 31st BMO was held in Pleven, Bulgaria on 2–7 May 2014.
- The 32nd BMO was held in Athens, Greece on 3–8 May 2015.
- The 33rd BMO was held in Tirana, Albania on 5–10 May 2016.
- The 34th BMO was held in Ohrid, Republic of Macedonia on 2–7 May 2017.
- The 35th BMO was held in Belgrade, Serbia on 7–12 May 2018.
- The 36th BMO was held in Chișinău, Moldova on 30 April -5 May 2019.
- The 37th BMO was hosted virtually due to Covid and organized by Romania on 31 October- 5 November 2020.
- The 38th BMO was hosted virtually due to Covid and organized by Cyprus on 6–10 September 2021.
- The 39th BMO was held in Agros, Cyprus on 4–9 May 2022.
- The 40th BMO was held in Antalya, Turkey on 8-13 May 2023.

== Junior Balkan Mathematical Olympiad ==
- The Junior Balkan Mathematical Olympiad is a similar competition, except that students must be under the age of 15.5 on the day of the contest.
