= Centre for Mathematical Sciences (Kerala) =

Indian research institute

- Location: Kerala, India
- Language: English

Centre for Mathematical Sciences (CMS), with campuses at Thiruvananthapuram and Pala in Kerala, India, is a research level institution devoted to mathematics and other related disciplines like statistics, theoretical physics, computer and information sciences. The centre was incorporated in 1977 as a non-profit scientific research and training centre under the Travancore-Cochin Literary, Scientific and Charitable Societies Registration Act XII of 1955. The driving force behind the establishment of the centre was Prof. Aleyamma George, who had been Professor and Head of the Department of Statistics of University of Kerala. Since 2006, the centre is a Department of Science and Technology (India) (DST), Government of India, New Delhi Centre for Mathematical Sciences and is fully financed by DST, New Delhi.

The centre is headed by a chairman, a position currently held by Dr. A Sukumaran Nair, a former vice-chancellor of Mahatma Gandhi University, Kottayam, and a Director a position now held by Dr. A.M. Mathai, emeritus professor of mathematics and statistics, McGill University, Canada. The activities of the Thiruvananthapuram Campus are coordinated by Dr. K. S. S. Nambooripad.

The centre has started doing good work in its early years itself. At present, several research teams are operating in the centre like Astrophysics Research Group, Fractional Calculus Research Group, Special Functions Research Group, Statistical Distribution Theory Research Group, Geometrical Probability Research Group, Stochastic Process Research Group, and Discrete Mathematics in Chemistry Research Group.

== History ==
Centre for Mathematical Sciences was established in 1977 in Trivandrum, Kerala, India. In 2002, the Pala Campus of the centre was established in a one-floor finished building donated by the Diocese of Palai in Kerala, India. In 2006, Hill Area Campus of the centre was established. The office, the library and most of the facilities are at the Pala Campus. Starting from 1985, Professor Dr. A.M. Mathai of McGill University, Canada is the director of the centre. In 2006-2007 the Department of Science and Technology (India) (DST) gave a development grant to the centre. Starting from December 2006, the centre is being developed as a DST Centre for Mathematical Sciences. DST has similar centres at three other locations in India.

From 1977 to 2006, the activities at the centre were carried out by a group of researchers in Kerala, mostly retired professors, through voluntary service. Starting from 2007, DST created full-time salaried positions of three assistant professors, one full professor and one liaison officer. They are at Pala Campus. DST approved up to 15 junior research fellows (JRF) and one senior research fellow (SRF). They are the current PhD students at the Pala Campus. They would receive their PhD degrees from Mahatma Gandhi University, Kottayam, Kerala.

== Publications ==
- Publications Series (books, proceedings, collections of research papers, lecture notes etc.)
- Newsletter of two issues per year
- Modules Series (self-study books on basic topics; current number is 6)
- Mathematical Sciences for the General Public Series

== Former chairmen ==
The following persons had held the position of chairman in the Centre for Mathematical Sciences.

- Mr. K.T. Chandy, former chairman, Kerala State Industrial Development Corporation.
- Prof. P.V. Sukhatme, statistician and nutritionist.
- Dr. K.R. Nair, former director of the Central Statistical Organization, Government of India and former director of the United Nations Asian Statistical Institute, Tokyo, Japan.
- Dr. G. Sankaranarayanan, former professor and head, Department of Mathematics and Statistics, Annamalai University.
- Dr. B.R. Bhat, a well-known probabilist.
- Dr. C.G. Ramachandran Nair, a former chairman of State Committee for Science, Technology and Environment (STEC) and a well-known chemist.
- Dr. A. Sukumaran Nair, former vice-chancellor of Mahatma Gandhi University, Kottayam, Kerala, India.
