= Chateau Bleu Motel =

- U.S. National Register of Historic Places
- New Jersey Register of Historic Places
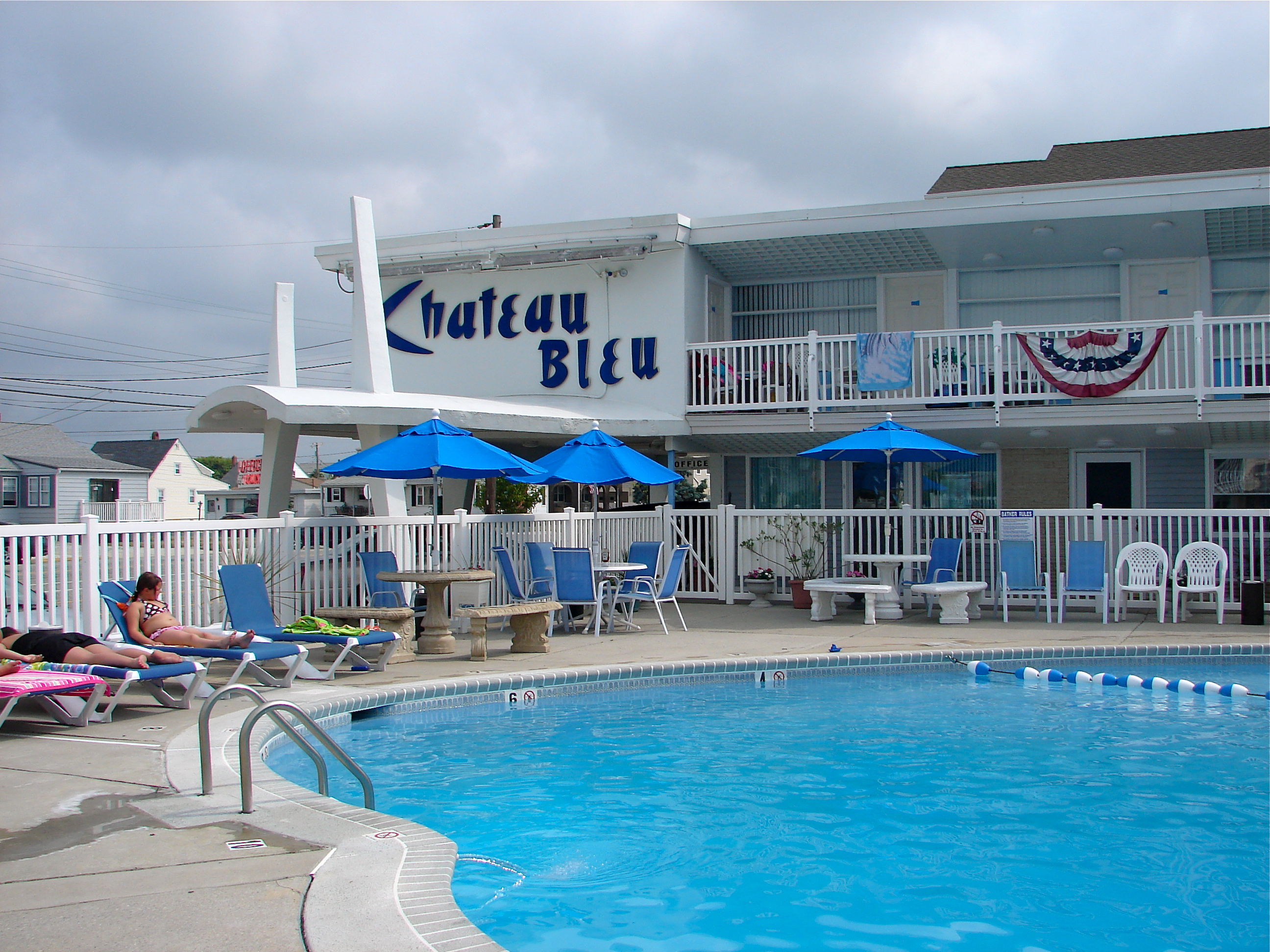

- Location within Cape May County, New Jersey Location within New Jersey Location within the United States
- Location: 911 Surf Avenue, North Wildwood, New Jersey
- Coordinates: 39°0′5″N 74°47′42″W
- Built: 1962
- Architectural style: Moderne, Googie
- MPS: Motels of the Wildwoods MPDF
- NRHP reference No.: 04000221
- NJRHP No.: 4238

Significant dates
- Added to NRHP: March 25, 2004
- Designated NJRHP: January 16, 2004

The Chateau Bleu Motel was located at 911 Surf Avenue in the city of North Wildwood in Cape May County, New Jersey, United States. The historic motel was in an area known as, and designated by the state of New Jersey as, the Wildwoods Shore Resort Historic District. The building was built in 1962 in the distinctive "Googie" or "Doo Wop" architectural style. Googie details included the heart shaped swimming pool and the spikes (one of which is broken) at the entrance. The motel was added to the National Register of Historic Places on March 25, 2004, for its significance in architecture, community development, and entertainment. It was listed as part of the Motels of the Wildwoods Multiple Property Submission (MPS).

The motel was demolished beginning in April 2025 despite efforts to save the building.

== See also ==
- National Register of Historic Places listings in Cape May County, New Jersey
- Caribbean Motel
