= Wildwoods Shore Resort Historic District =

Historic district in The Wildwoods, New Jersey, United States

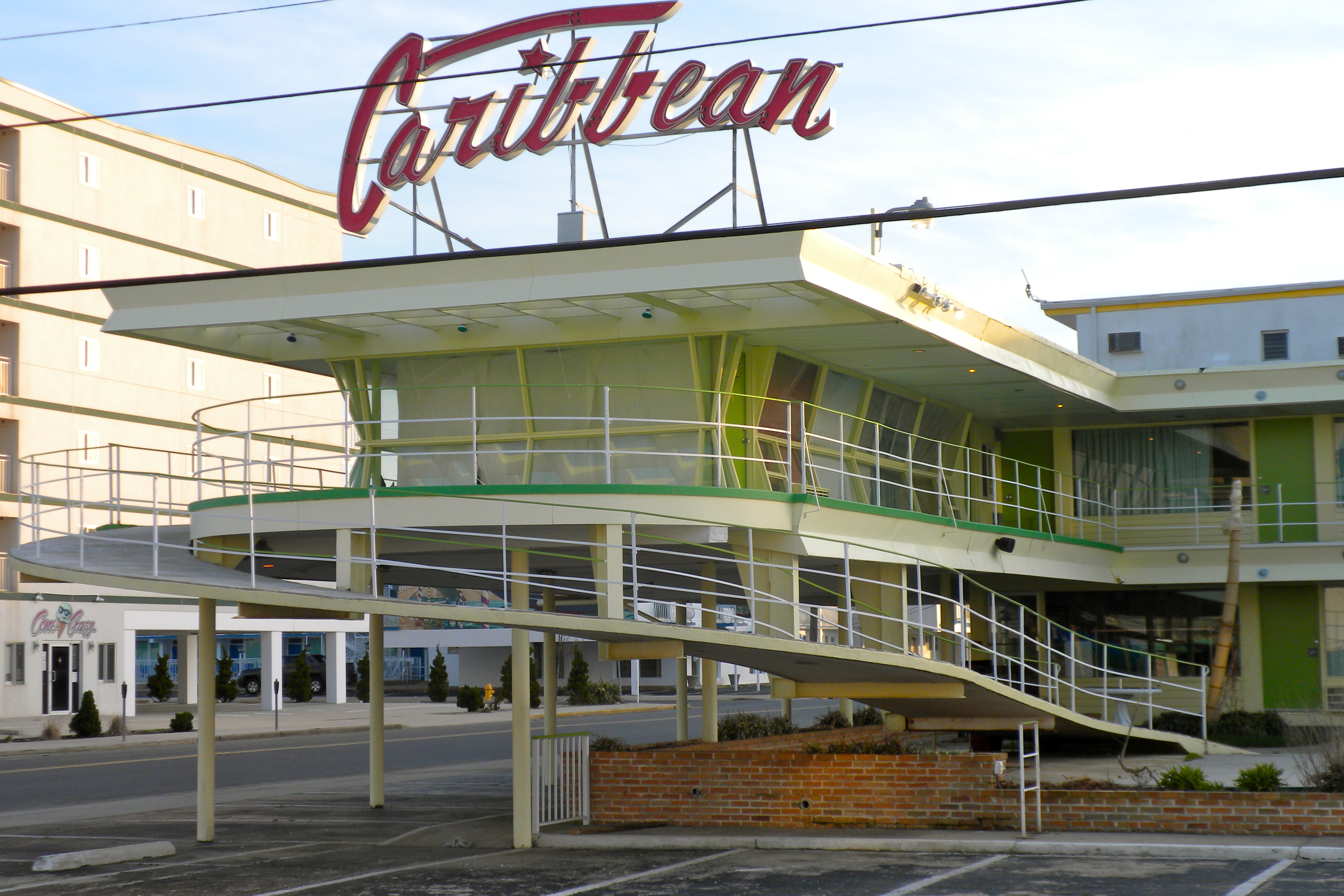
The Caribbean Motel

The Wildwoods Shore Resort Historic District, or Doo Wop Motel District, is an area in The Wildwoods, New Jersey, that was home to over 300 motels built during the Doo-Wop era of the 1950s and 1960s. Officially recognized as a historic district by the State of New Jersey, it lies primarily in the municipality of Wildwood Crest, along a two-mile stretch between Atlantic and Ocean avenues, and includes areas in Wildwood and North Wildwood. The term doo-wop was coined by Cape May's Mid-Atlantic Center for the Arts in the early 1990s to describe the unique, space-age architectural style, which is also referred to as the Googie or populuxe style.

The motels are very stylized, with Vegas-like neon signs, plastic palm trees, and fantastic architecture. Construction of condominia in the area has resulted in the demolition of many motels, but the Wildwood Doo Wop Preservation League has taken action to help save and restore the remaining historic buildings. The Caribbean Motel in Wildwood Crest, and the Chateau Bleu Motel in North Wildwood are both listed on the National Register of Historic Places.

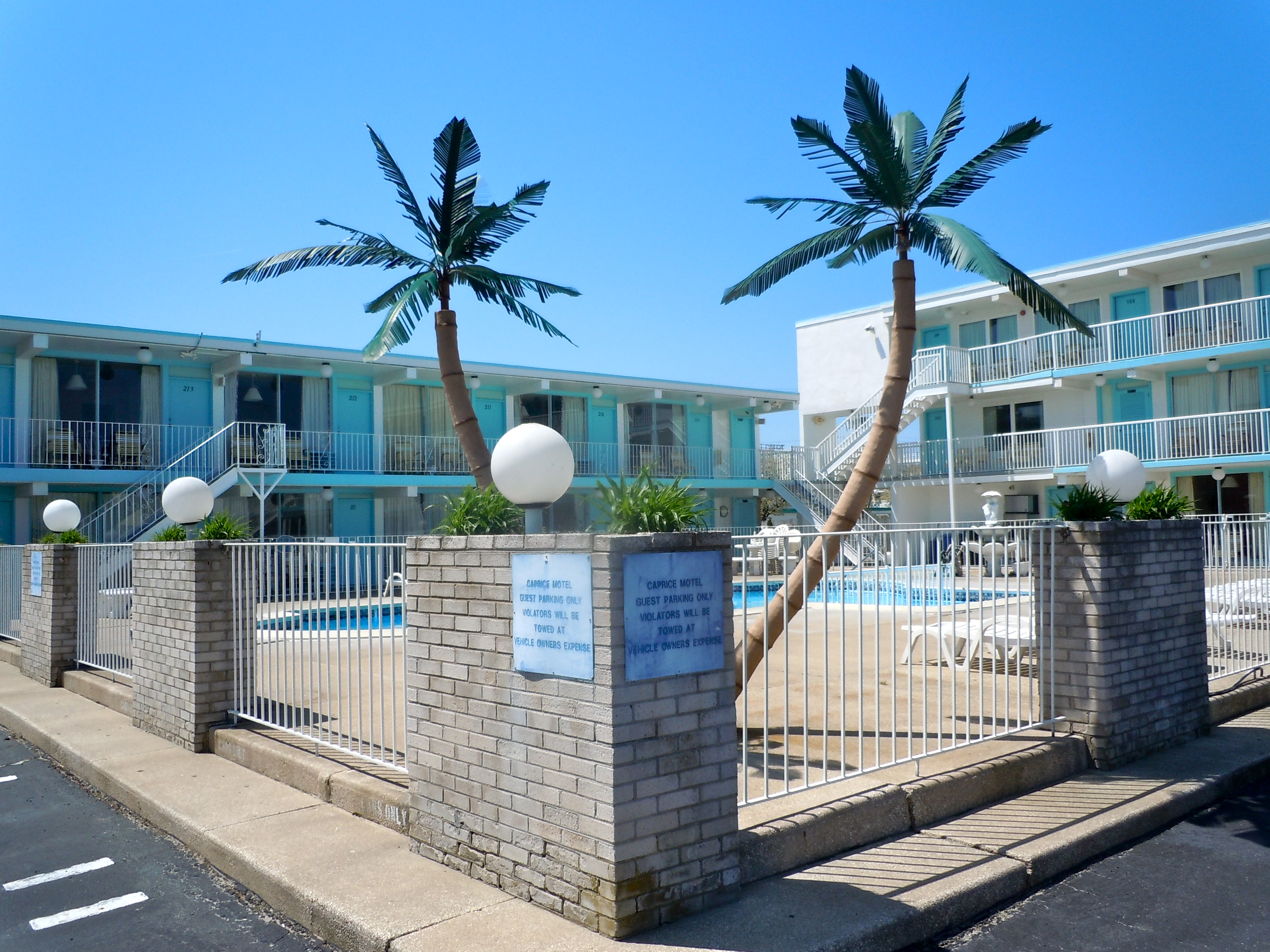
Plastic palm trees at the Caprice in Wildwood

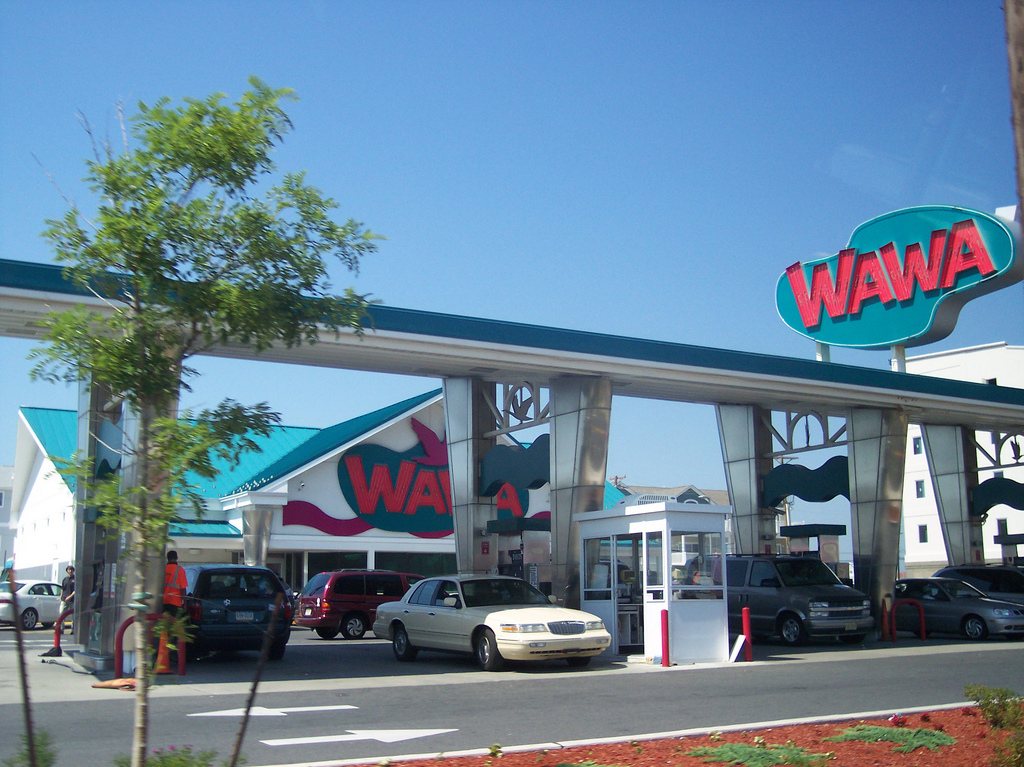
Doo-wop styled Wawa Food Market

A 1950s Doo Wop museum has recently been built which contains property from demolished motels such as neon signs and furniture. Neo-Doo Wop buildings in the area feature a neon-lit Wawa and a 1950s-style Acme Supermarket.

== History ==
Motel construction in the Wildwoods began in the early 1950s. 1958 was a banner year for construction in Wildwood Crest, with the opening of the Satellite, Caribbean, El Reno (later the South Beach Motel), Sand Castle, Swan Motel and Tangiers motels. The Rio Motel, in Wildwood proper, also made its debut that spring. New motels were built into the 1970s.

=== Morey Brothers ===
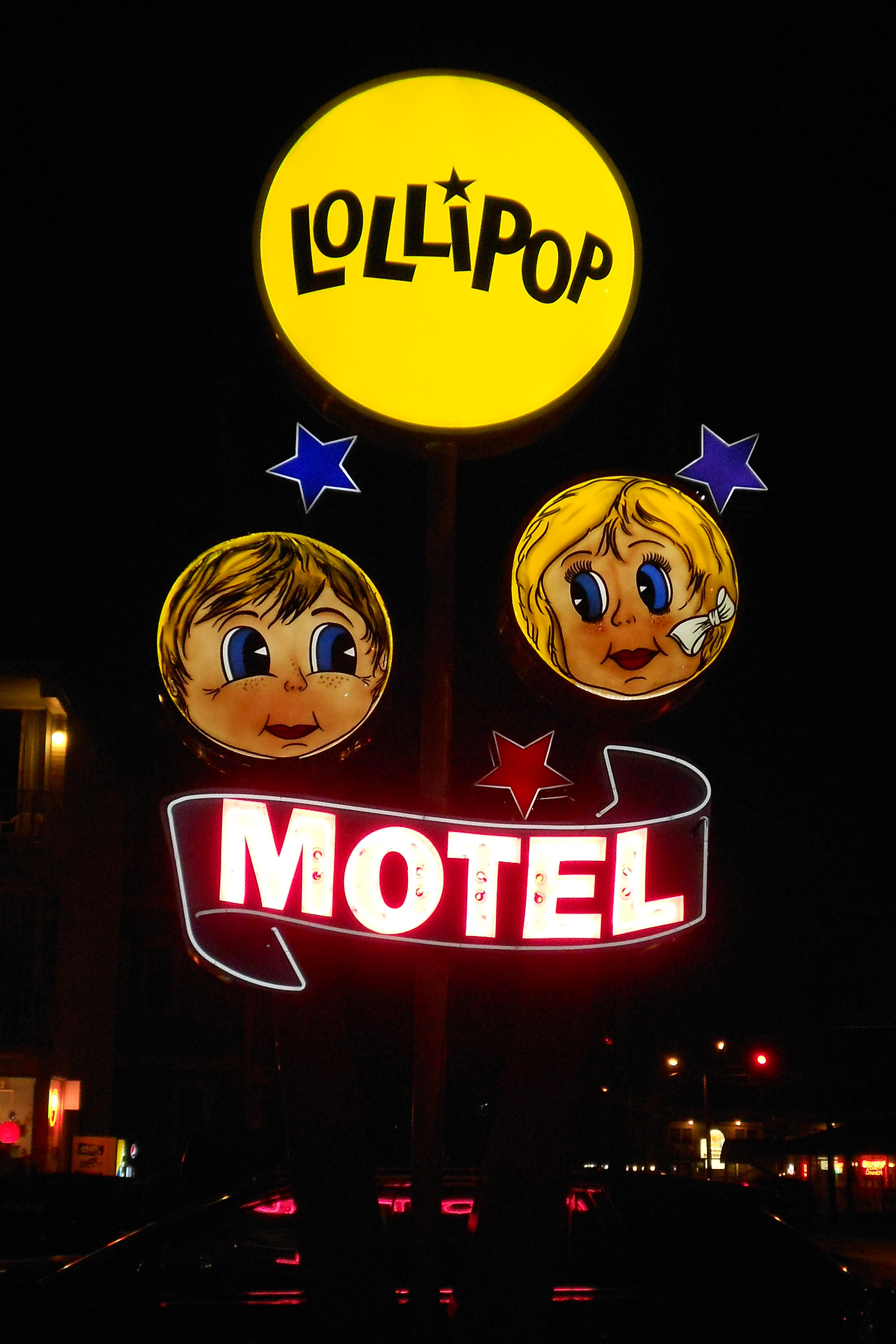
The sign of the Lollipop Motel in North Wildwood

Many of these Doo-Wop motels were designed by the brothers Lewis J. (Lou) and Wilburt C. (Will) Morey, born in West Wildwood in 1925 and 1927, respectively. In 1952, their company Morey Brothers Builders built Wildwood's first motel, the single-story Jay's Motel, at the corner of Hildreth and Atlantic Avenues. In 1955 they dissolved their formal business partnership and began to work more independently on motel designs.

=== Styles ===
Doo Wop motels generally include U-shaped or L-shaped designs of two or three stories, asymmetric elements, swimming pools, adjacent parking or second story sun decks over parking spaces, plastic palm trees, angular walls or windows, flat overhanging roofs, prominent neon signs and railing, bright colors, and a contemporary or fantasy theme. References to popular culture or history were also common. The themes or sub-styles have been classified as: Modern/Blastoff, Vroom, Chinatown Revival, Tiki (Polynesian Pop), and Phony Colonee. The Blastoff style is reminiscent of the jet-age airports of the 1950s and 1960s. The Vroom style includes forward-thrusting building elements. Phony Colonee imitates the mass market Colonial Revival architecture of the 1950s and 1960s with Colonial American brick and lamppost elements

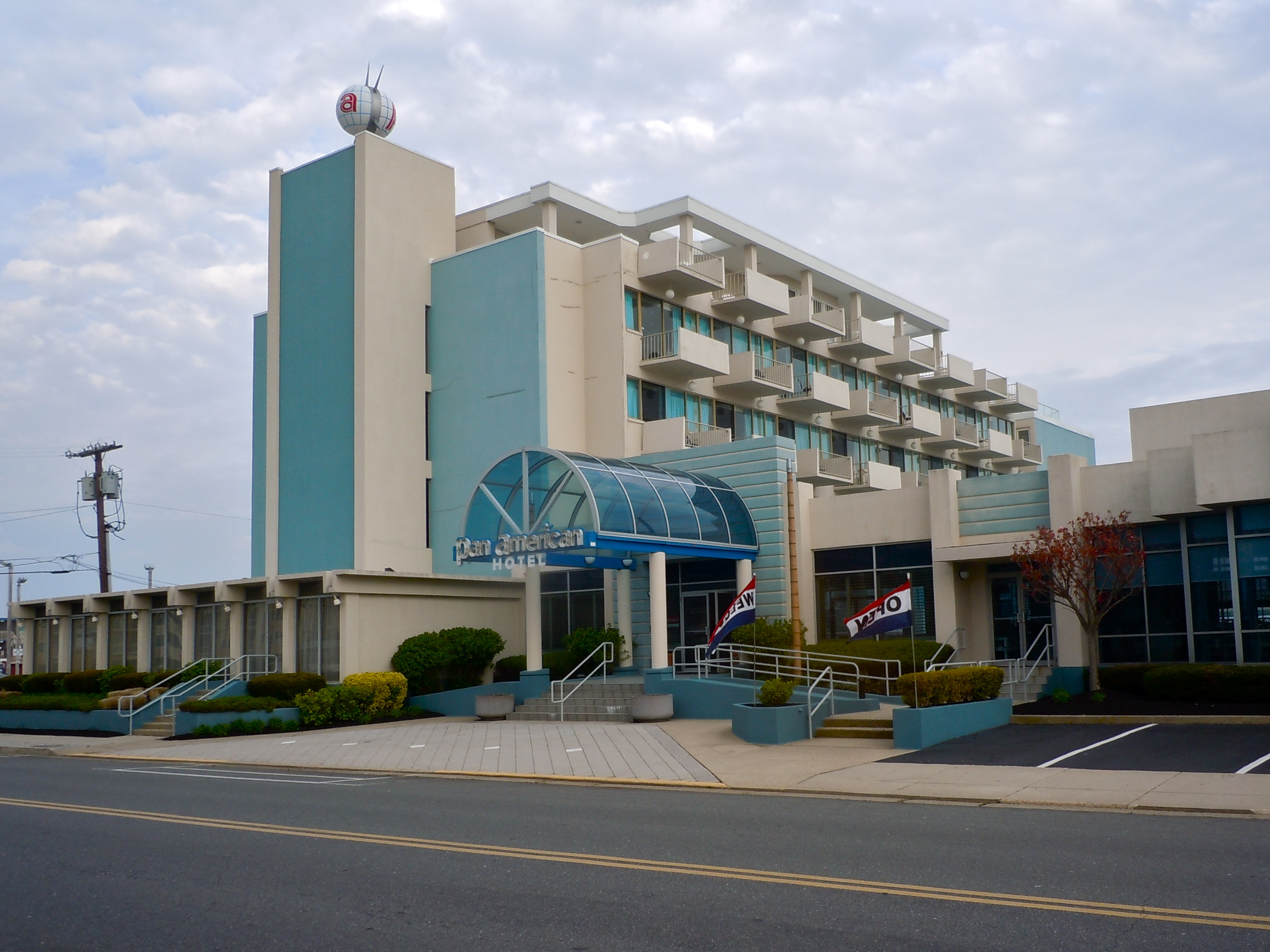
The Pan American in the Vroom style

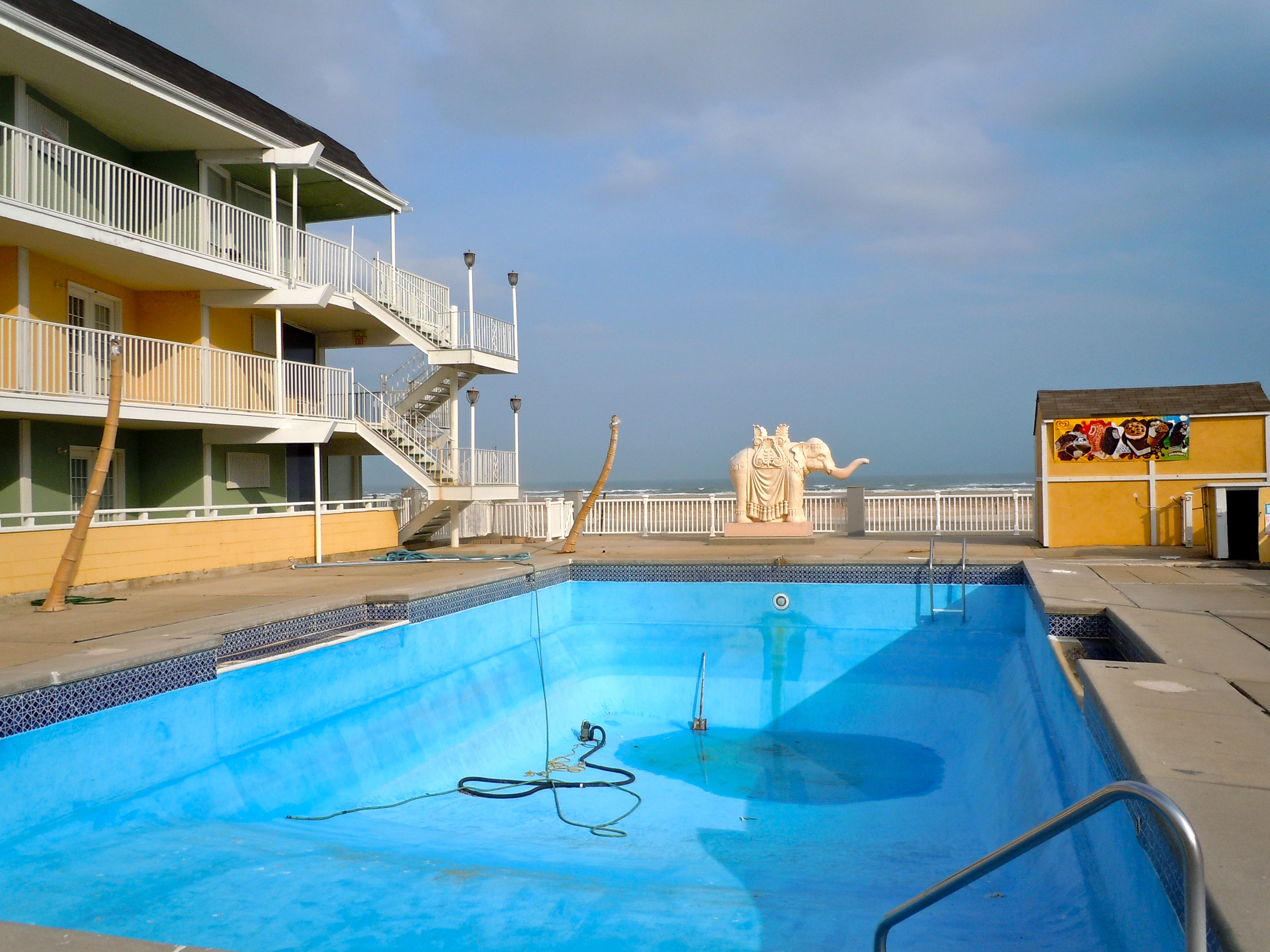
The Singapore in the Chinatown Revival style

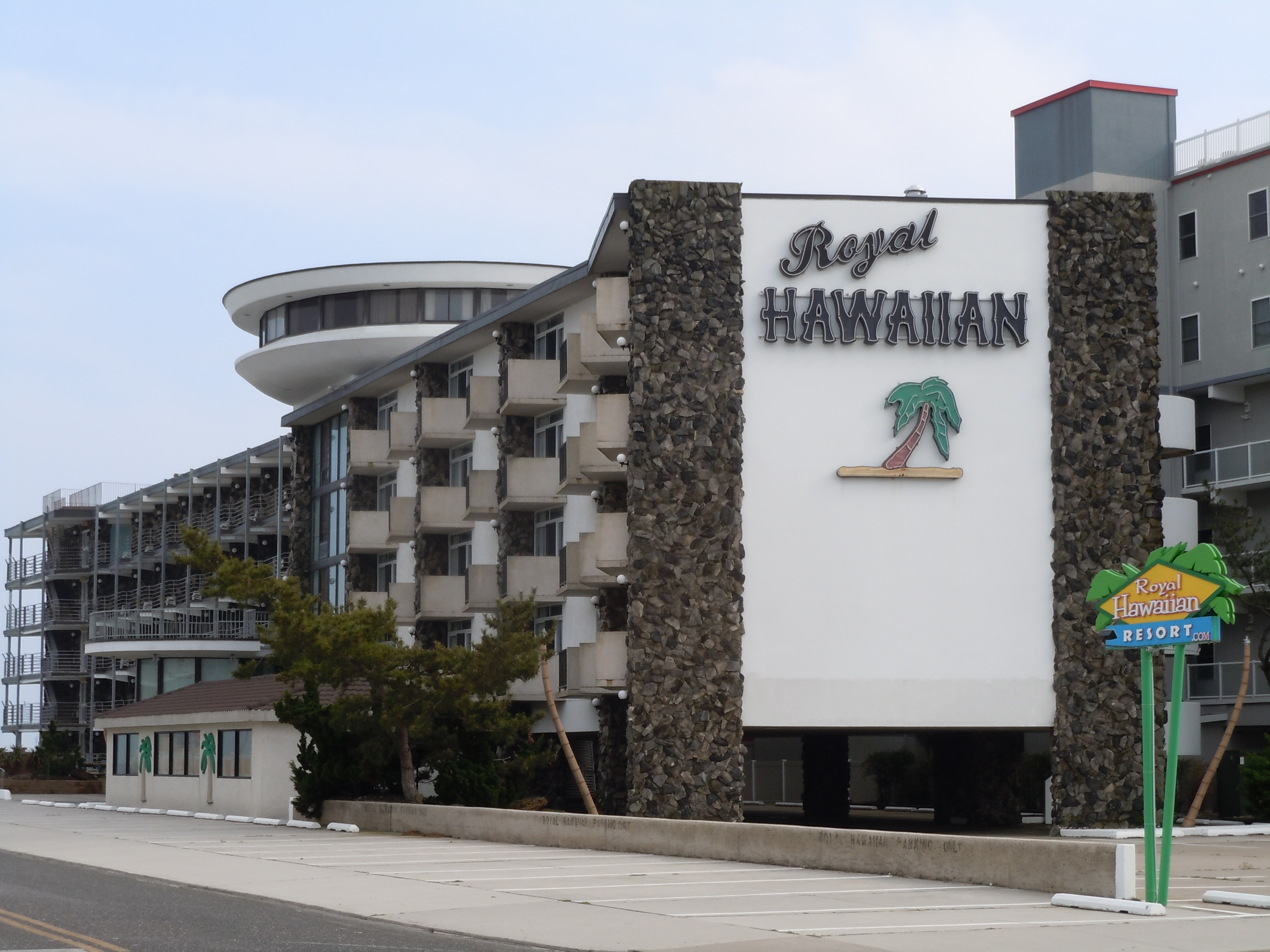
The Royal Hawaiian in the Tiki style

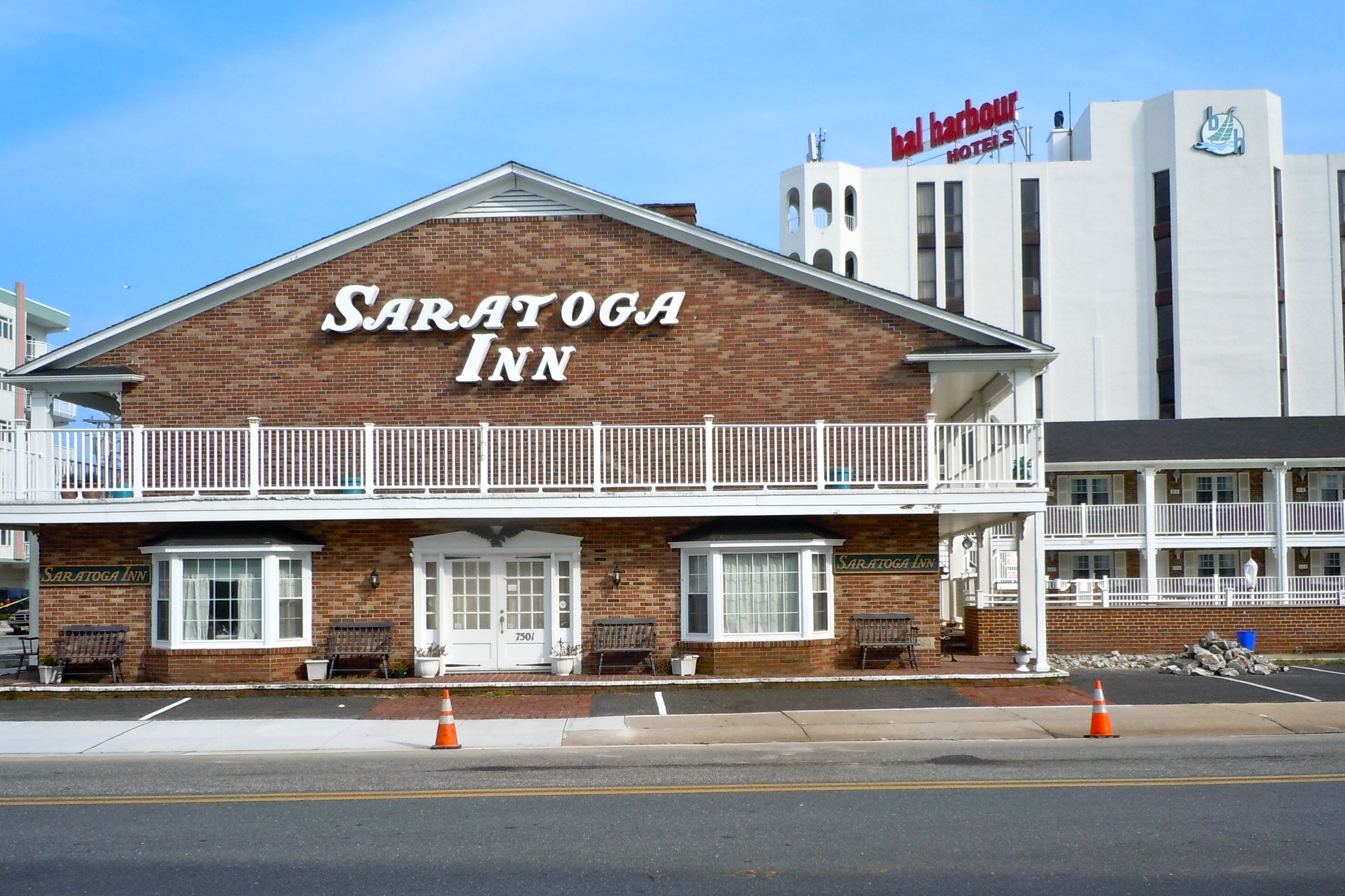
The Saratoga in the Phony Colonee style

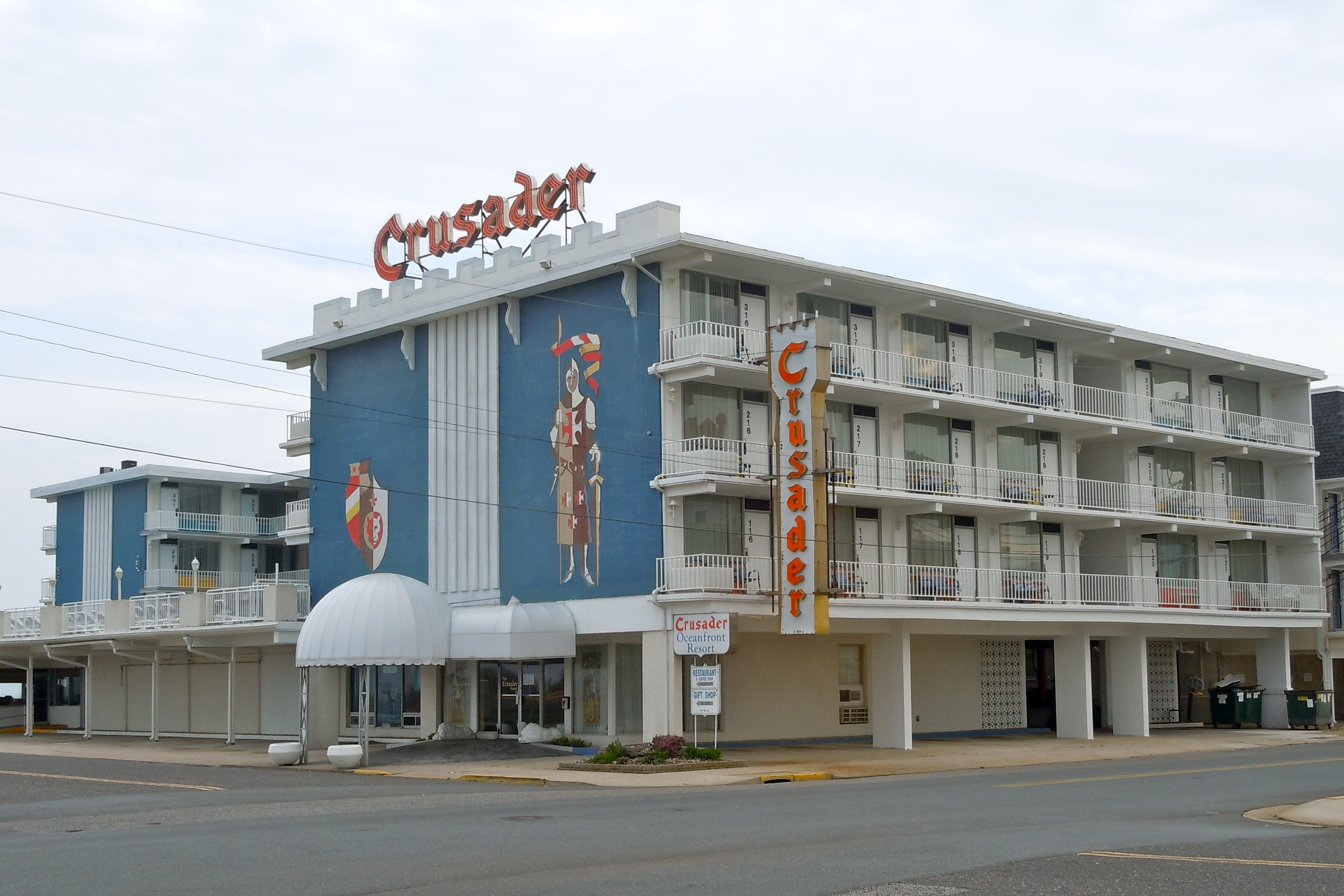
The Crusader has a historical theme

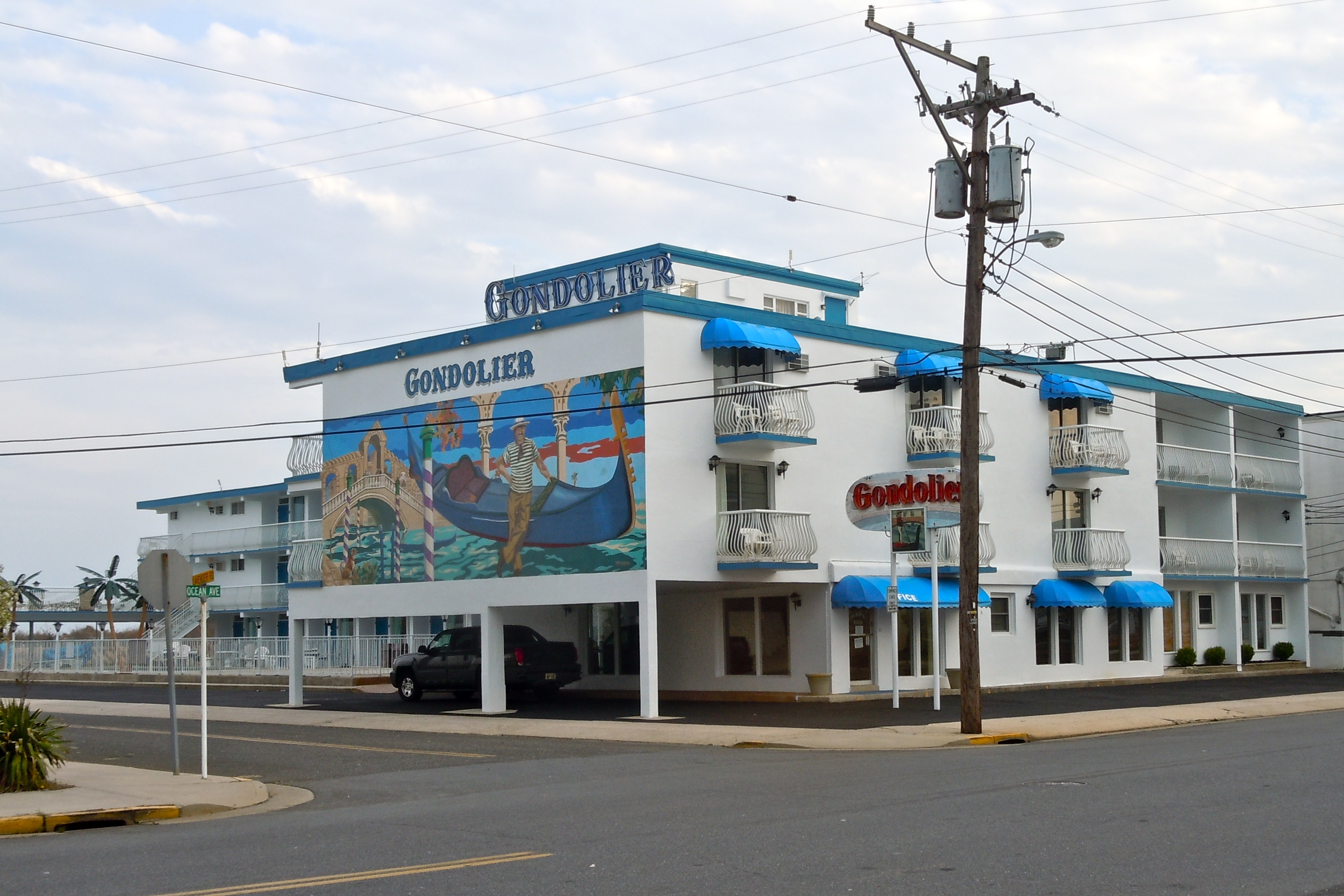
The Gondolier

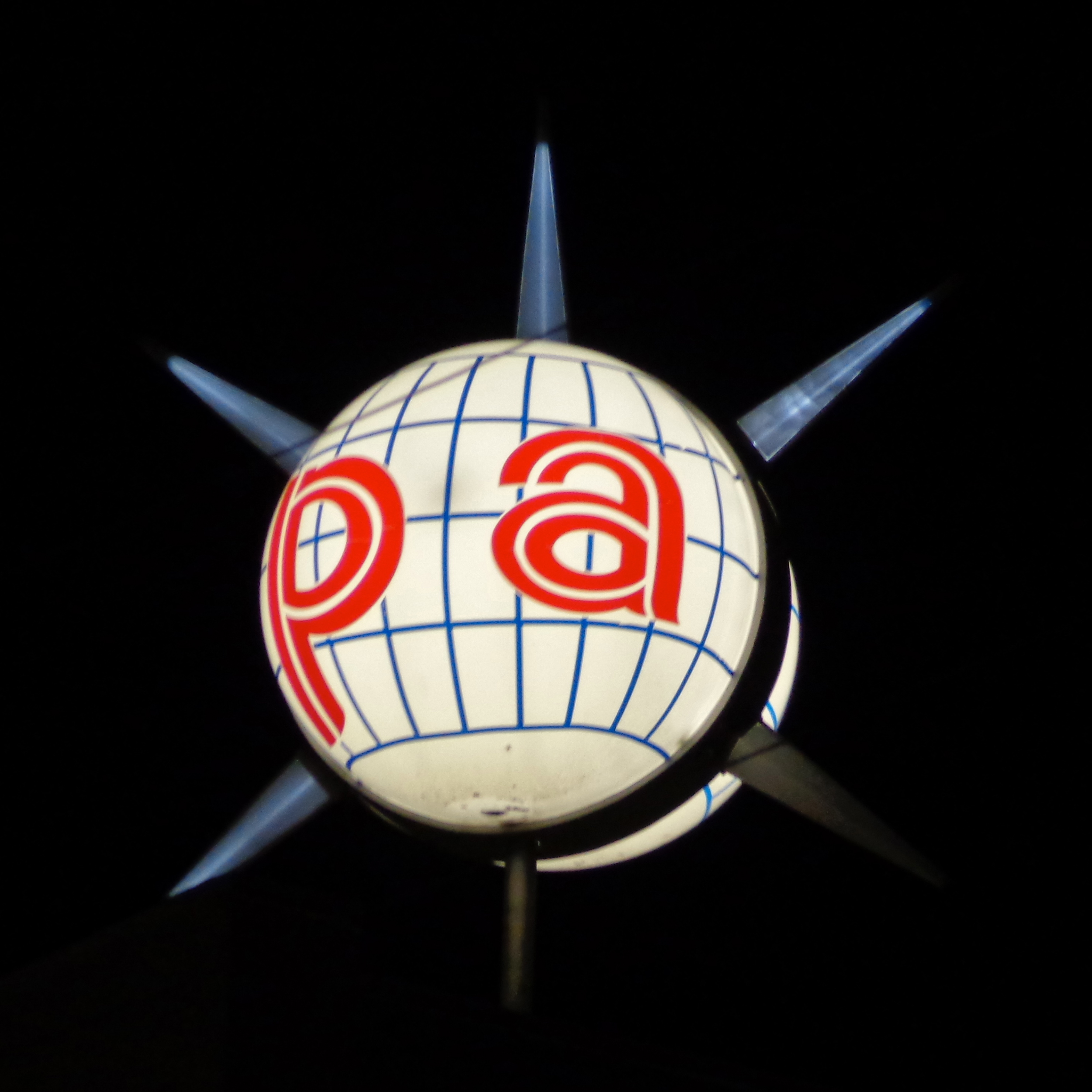
The rotating Pan American Motel sign, one of only two rotating signs in the Wildwoods

== Neon signs ==
Each motel typically had one or more large, garish neon signs used to draw in passing motorists to their establishment. These signs became part of the architectural style and motels competed to have the most distinctive sign. Two firms supplied most of the signs, Ace Sign Company and Allied Sign Company, with W. Robert Hentges becoming the best known local sign designer. Hentges originally worked for Ace, then moved to Allied, and later founded his own company. Local laws banned flashing signs and limited revolving signs.

== Existing motels ==
=== Caribbean Motel ===
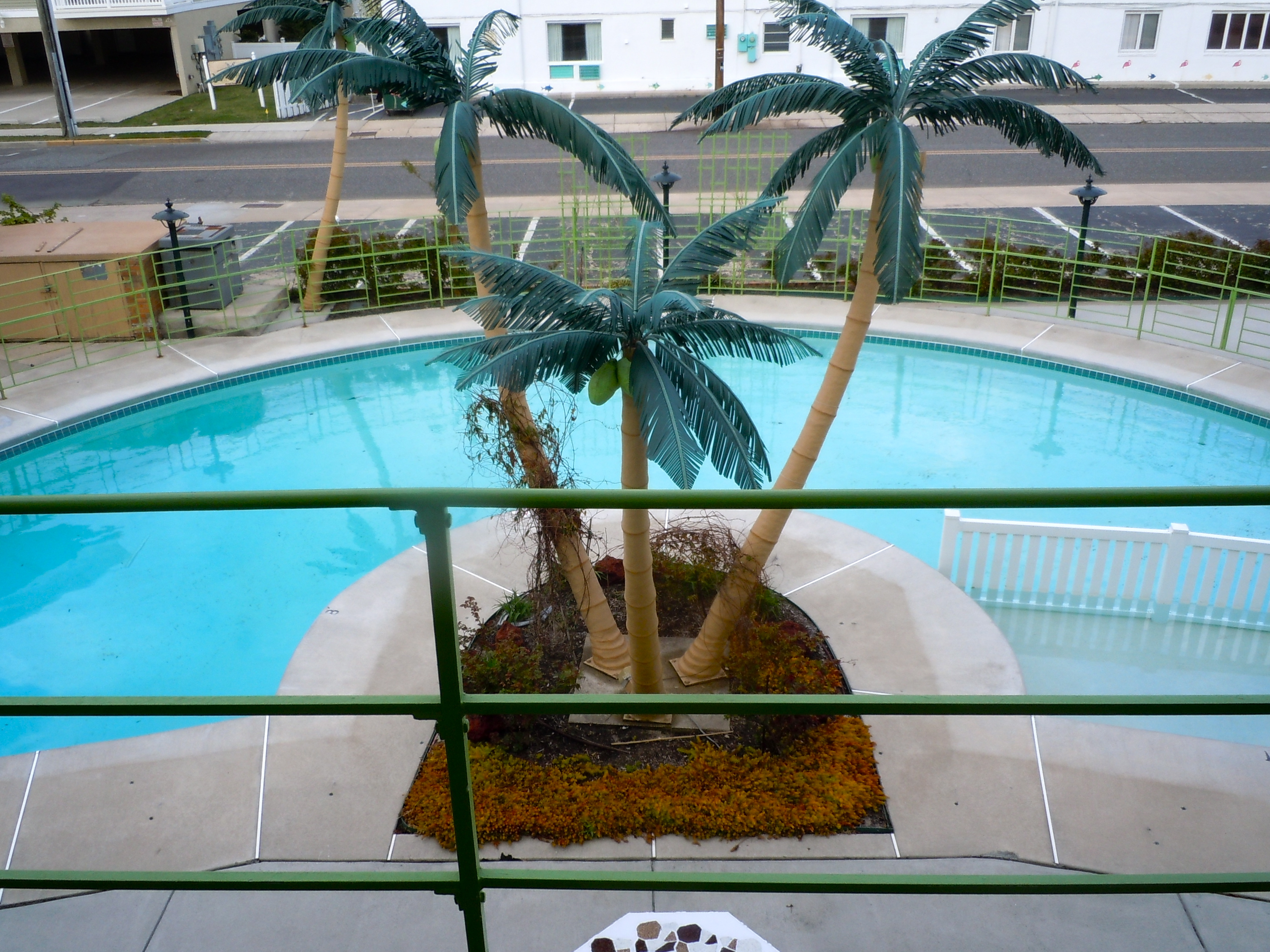
The Caribbean Motel's C-shaped swimming pool and plastic palm trees

The Caribbean Motel in Wildwood Crest, built in 1958 and now restored, was the first motel to use the full-size plastic palm trees that now adorn most of the Doo Wop motels in the area. The motel was saved from demolition in 2004, when it was purchased by George Miller and Caroline Emigh, who succeeded in getting the property placed on the national historic registry. After reading the book, How to Doo Wop: the Wildwoods-by-the-Sea Handbook of Design Guidelines published by the Doo Wop Preservation League, they were so impressed by the suggested designs of Philadelphia architect Anthony Bracali that they hired him to oversee restoration of the motel. The interior design was done by Darleen Lev, a designer from New York City who was staying at the motel around the time that Miller and Emigh bought the property. An admirer of the Technicolor film process, Lev's designs are modeled on movie sets of the 1950s, as well as reflecting the motel's Caribbean motif. The Caribbean Motel was owned by the Rossi family for more than 30 years, until the early 1990s.

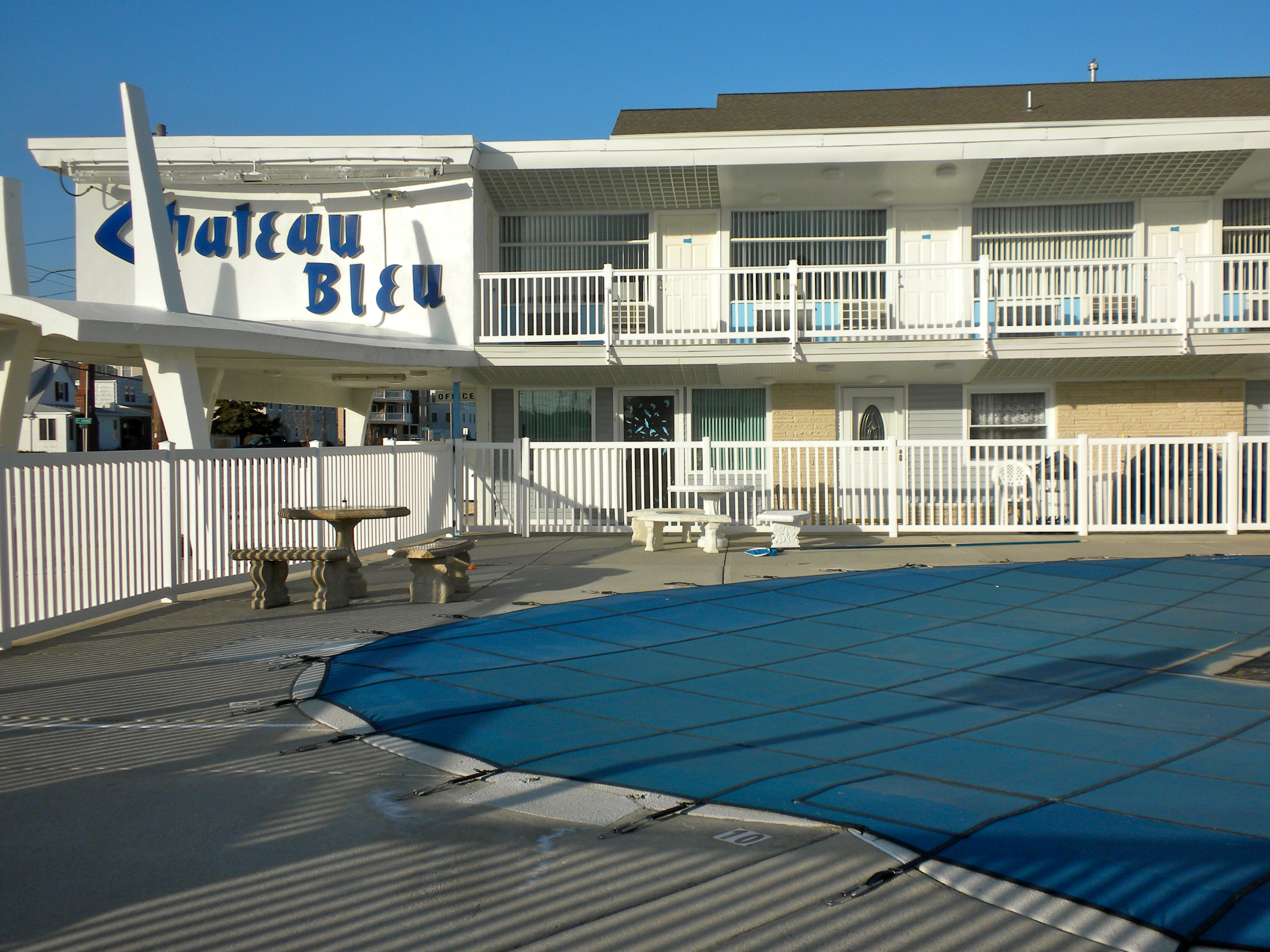
Chateau Bleu Motel

=== Chateau Bleu Motel ===
Located in North Wildwood, Chateau Bleu Motel was built in 1962 and added to the National Register of Historic Places on March 25, 2004. It features a heart shaped swimming pool.

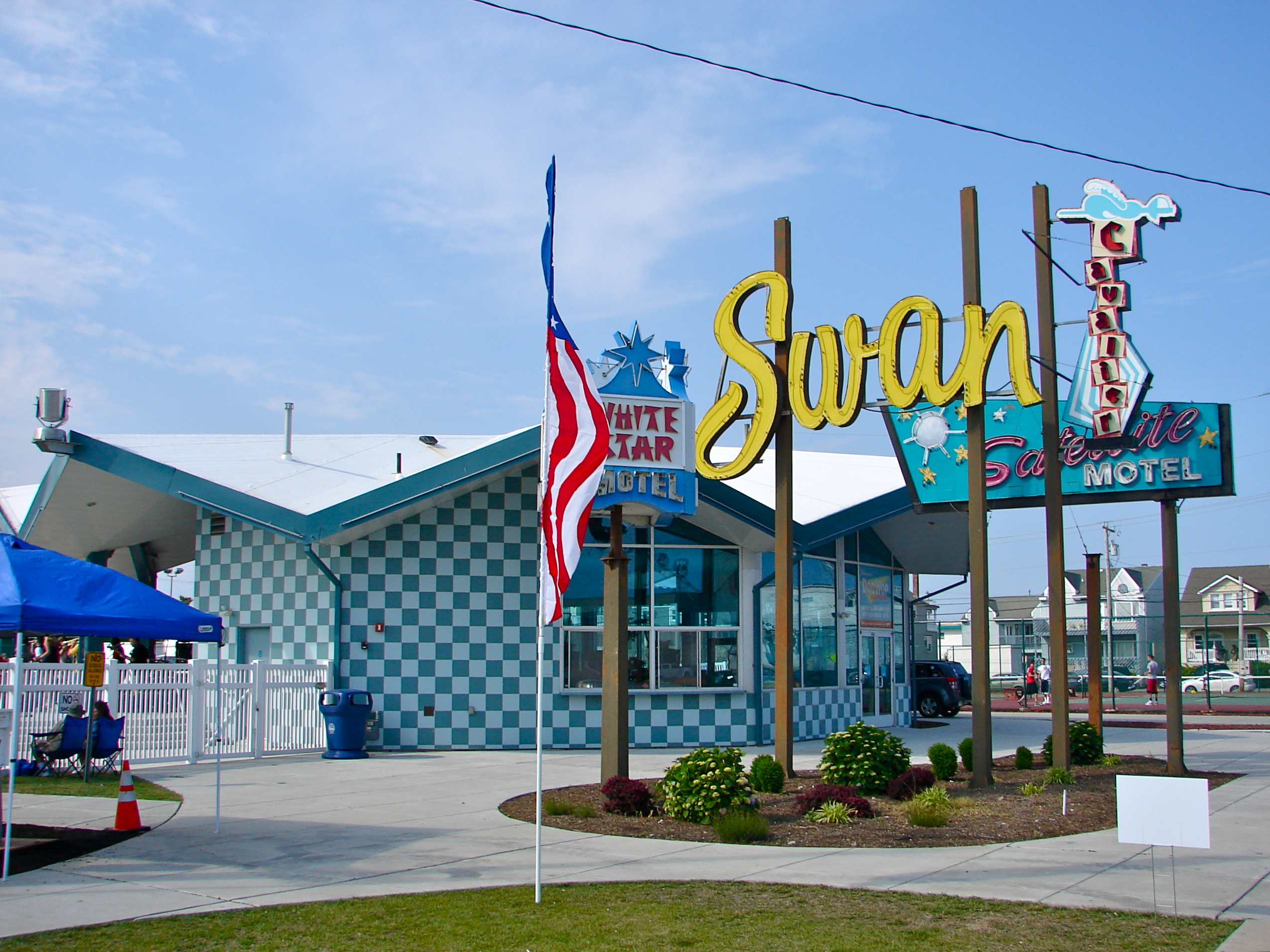
Neon Garden at the Doo Wop Experience

=== Oceanview Motel ===
The Oceanview Motel in Wildwood Crest, which was built in 1964, is the largest motel ever built in The Wildwoods. In 2009, the owners had plans to demolish the motel to make way for condominia, but it was rejected by the New Jersey Department of Environmental Protection. The Oceanview was originally named the Admiral East Motel, when the Admiral West Motel (now the Admiral Resort Motel), shared the same owner.The motel was purchased in 2022 and will be fully remodeled after years of neglect. It will be rebranded as Madison Resort Wildwood Crest.

=== Other motels ===
Notable existing motels also include: The Jolly Roger, The Pan American, The Crusader, the Armada-By-The-Sea, The Waikiki, The Newport, The Sea Shell, The Admiral, The Adventurer, The VIP, The Carriage Stop, The Daytona, The Granada, The Tangiers, the Park Lane, the Yankee Clipper and the Surf Comber.

== Extant historic motels ==
Name	Image	Built	Location	Coordinates	Description	Web URL
Admiral Motel		1971	Rambler Rd & Atlantic Ave.	38.9752°N 74.8293°W	Once the Admiral West, when its neighbor across the street was also called Admiral (East) Date is circa - does not appear on a 1970 overhead of property (see historicaerials.com) - is listed in 1973 G.W.H.M. Accommodations Directory	https://www.admiralresort.com/
Aqua Beach			Buttercup & Ocean Ave.	38.9771°N 74.8246°W		https://www.aquabeach.com/
Armada By The Sea		1973	Forget-me-not & Beach Ave.	38.9723°N 74.8311°W		https://www.armadamotel.com/
American Safari		1969	Lavender & Ocean Ave.	38.9769°N 74.8257°W	Zoo theme	https://www.americansafarimotel.com/
Astronaut Motel		1963	Stockton & beach	38.9680°N 74.8359°W	Date is circa - the Astronaut is visible on a 1963 overhead of the property (see historicaerials.com). Does not appear in 1961 G.W.H.M Accommodations Directory (though hotels/motels did not necessarily participate).	https://astronautmotel.biz/
Attache Resort		1966	Heather & Ocean Ave.	38.9762°N 74.8261°W		https://attache-motel.com/
Aztec Resort		1960	Lavender & Atlantic Ave.	38.9774°N 74.8263°W	Its western annex building is older and was originally the Coral Sands Motel	https://aztecmotel.com/
Beach Colony Motel		1963	Stockton & Ocean Ave.	38.9682°N 74.8367°W	Originally the Golden Nugget. Date is circa - the Golden Nugget is visible on a 1963 overhead of the property (see historicaerials.com). Does not appear in 1961 G.W.H.M Accommodations Directory.	https://beachcolonymotel.com/
Bel Air		1956	Morning Glory & Ocean Ave.	38.9775°N 74.8250°W	Just north of the Caribbean. "7-shaped" Date is circa - the Bel Air appears on a 1956 overhead of the property (see historicaerials.com). Originally one floor.	http://belairmotel.net/
Biscayne		1968	Louisville and Atlantic	38.96652°N 74.83978°W	Built by Bob Luglio	https://www.biscaynemotel.com/
Bristol Plaza		1970	Rosemary and Beach	38.9727°N 74.8305°W		https://www.bristolplazamotel.com/
Cape Cod Inn		1966	Sweetbriar and Atlantic	38.9747°N 74.8293°W	Originally three floors, and expanded to four in the 2000s.	https://www.facebook.com/Capecodinnmotel/
Cara Mara		1963	Fern & Ocean Ave.	38.9721°N 74.8329°W	Date is circa - the Cara Mara is visible on a 1963 overhead of the property (see historicaerials.com). Does not appear in 1961 G.W.H.M Accommodations Directory. Originally two floors, without oceanfront rooms.	http://caramara.com/
Caribbean Motel		1958	Buttercup & Ocean Ave. Wildwood Crest	38°58′45″N 74°49′32″W	Listed on the NRHP Owners claim it opened in 1957.	https://caribbeanmotel.com/
Carriage Stop		1958	Atlantic and St. Paul	38.96456°N 74.84146°W	Now the Carriage Stop Condominiums and available for rent via website, Airbnb, or VRBO.	http://www.carriagestopmotel.com/
Conca d’or Motel			East Stanton Road at the beach	38.9673°N 74.8366°W		https://www.concadormotelwildwoodcrest.com/
Compass Motel			Atlantic and Rosemary	38.9732°N 74.8319°W		http://www.compassmotel.com/
Crusader		Built 1968, opened 1970	Ocean and Cardinal	38.974331°N 74.828391°W		https://www.crusaderresort.com/
Crystal Beach Motor Inn			Atlantic and Aster	38.9760°N 74.8281°W		https://www.crystalbeachmotorinn.com/
Daytona Motor Inn		1950s	Youngs and Atlantic	38.98568°N 74.81603°W		https://www.daytonamotorinn.com/
Diamond Crest			Atlantic and Primrose	38.970613°N 74.835149°W		https://diamondcrestmotel.com/
Fleur de Lis Resort		1966	Ocean and Sweetbriar	38.9742°N 74.8285°W		https://www.fleurdelisbeach.com/
Gold Crest		1967	Atlantic and Fern	38.972398°N 74.832394°W		https://goldcrestmotel.com/
Gondolier		1965	Lavender & Beach Ave. Wildwood Crest	38.9762°N 74.8255°W	Italian themed, "F shaped"	https://gondolier.com/
Imperial 500		1964	Forget-Me-Not Road & Atlantic Avenue, Wildwood Crest	38.972554°N 74.832337°W	East end expanded to four floors (from the original three) in the first half of the 2000s.	https://www.imperial500.com/
Jolly Roger		1959	Ocean, Lotus, and Palm	38.971371°N 74.33772°W	Originally on the beach, before Ocean Avenue expanded south. U-shaped.	https://www.jollyrogermotel.com/
Lollipop Motel		1969	23rd Ave. & Atlantic Ave.	38.99326°N 74.805635°W	Originally developed by multi-billionaire M. Bolero. Also the site of his death in 1981 in a tragic drowning accident.	https://lollipopmotel.com/
Nassau Inn		1969	Ocean and Wisteria	38.9739°N 74.82925°W	Date is circa - appears in 1970 overhead of property (see historicaerials.com).	https://nassauinnwildwood.com/
Ocean Holiday		1973	Beach Ave. & Rosemary	38.9725°N 74.8309°W		
Oceanview		1963	Rambler Rd and Ocean Ave.	38.9692°N 74.8356°W	Date is circa - appears in 1963 overhead of property (see historicaerials.com) Does not appear in 1961 G.W.H.M Accommodations Directory. Originally called Admiral, and later Admiral East (once the West motel was built across the street), then by 1992 it became the Ocean View. Initially two floors. It was replaced by Madison Resort in 2024.	https://oceanviewmotelnj.com/
Olympic Island		1973	Beach and Rosemary	38.9725°N 74.8309°W	renamed Olympic Island Beach Resort	https://www.olympicbeachresort.com/
Pan American		1964	Ocean, Crocus, and Aster	38.972554°N 74.832337°W		https://www.moreyspiers.com/hotels/pan-american
Park Lane		1963	Ocean, Crocus, and Aster	38.975723°N 74.827642°W	Date is circa - appears in 1963 overhead of property (see historicaerials.com) Does not appear in 1961 G.W.H.M Accommodations Directory.	https://parklaneresorts.com/
Pink Orchid			Atlantic and Orchid	38.969663°N 74.836524°W		https://pink-orchid-condominium.business.site/
Royal Hawaiian		1969	Orchid and Ocean	38.9684°N 74.8359°W	Polynesian Pop East wing is from 1969, West wing from 1978	https://royalhawaiianresort.com/
Sand Castle Motel			Ocean & Stockton	38.9684°N 74.8374°W	has since been demolished	
Sand Dune			Atlantic and Myrtle	38.971013°N 74.834338°W		https://www.sanddunenj.com/
Saratoga Inn		1960	Stanton & Ocean	38.9675°N 74.8375°W	Phoney Colonee	https://www.saratogawildwood.com/
Sea Chest Motel		1956	Atlantic and Stockton	38.9688°N 74.8375°W	Family-owned motel with a large pool, one block from the beach; one of the few remaining original family-operated Doo-Wop motels in Wildwood Crest.	https://seachestmotel.com/
Sea Drift			Atlantic and Buttercup	38.9782°N 74.8267°W	Now called the Buttercup Condominiums and there are also the Sea Drift Motel Apts located on Lavender at Atlantic.	https://www.realtor.com/realestateandhomes-detail/302-E-Buttercup-Rd-Apt-1_Wildwood_NJ_08260_M58649-77258
Sea Gull		1964	Atlantic and Cresse	38.97896°N 74.82454°W		https://www.seagull-motel.com/
Sea Kist			Hildreth and Ocean	38.97884°N 74.82303°W		http://www.seakistmotelnj.com/
Sea Scape Inn			On Crocus between Atlantic and Ocean	38.97604°N 74.82782°W		https://theseascape.com/
Sea Shell			Atlantic and Rio Grande	38.98116°N 74.82140°W	Contains an ice cream shop with a motel behind	https://seashellmotelnj.com/
Sea Ray			Ocean and Leaming	38.97986°N 74.82167°W		https://www.booking.com/hotel/us/sea-ray-motel-wildwood.html
Shalimar		1964	Rosemary and Atlantic	38.9734°N 74.8312°W	Restored in 2005 & expanded to allow for two-floor units + single level motel rooms, raising the height to five stories (originally three).	https://www.shalimarresortnj.com/
The Shore House			Atlantic and Atlanta	38.96678°N 74.83807°W	Currently, possibly permanently, closed	
Singapore		1964	Orchid and Ocean	38.96862°N 74.83528°W	Currently closed and undergoing construction	
Tangiers		1958	Atlantic, Sweetbriar, and Ocean	38.97479°N 74.82993°W		https://www.tangiersmotel.com/
Viking		1960	Columbine and Ocean	38.9734°N 74.8308°W	Date is circa - the Viking is listed in a 1961 G.W.H.M. Accommodations Directory.	https://www.viking-motel.com/
V.I.P.		1965	Forget-Me-Not, Atlantic, and Ocean	38.97292°N 74.83184°W		https://www.vipfamilymotel.com/
Waikiki		1969	Wisteria and Beach	38.9736°N 74.8292°W	By the beach & library, Polynesian Pop Date is circa - appears in 1970 overhead of property (see historicaerials.com).	https://www.waikikiinn.com/
Waters Edge Ocean Resort		1980, Expanded 2003	Beach and Buttercup	38.9765°N 74.8251°W		https://watersedgeoceanresort.com/
Yankee Clipper		1966	Cardinal and Ocean	38.9748°N 74.8288°W		https://yankeeclippermotel.com/

== Demolished motels ==
From 2003 to 2006, over 50 motels had been demolished to make way for condominium development. In addition to the Ebb Tide, notable demolished motels in the area included the Satellite, Kona Kai, Waterways, Christine Motor Inn, Fantasy, Rio, and Sea Rose motels.

=== Ebb Tide Motel ===
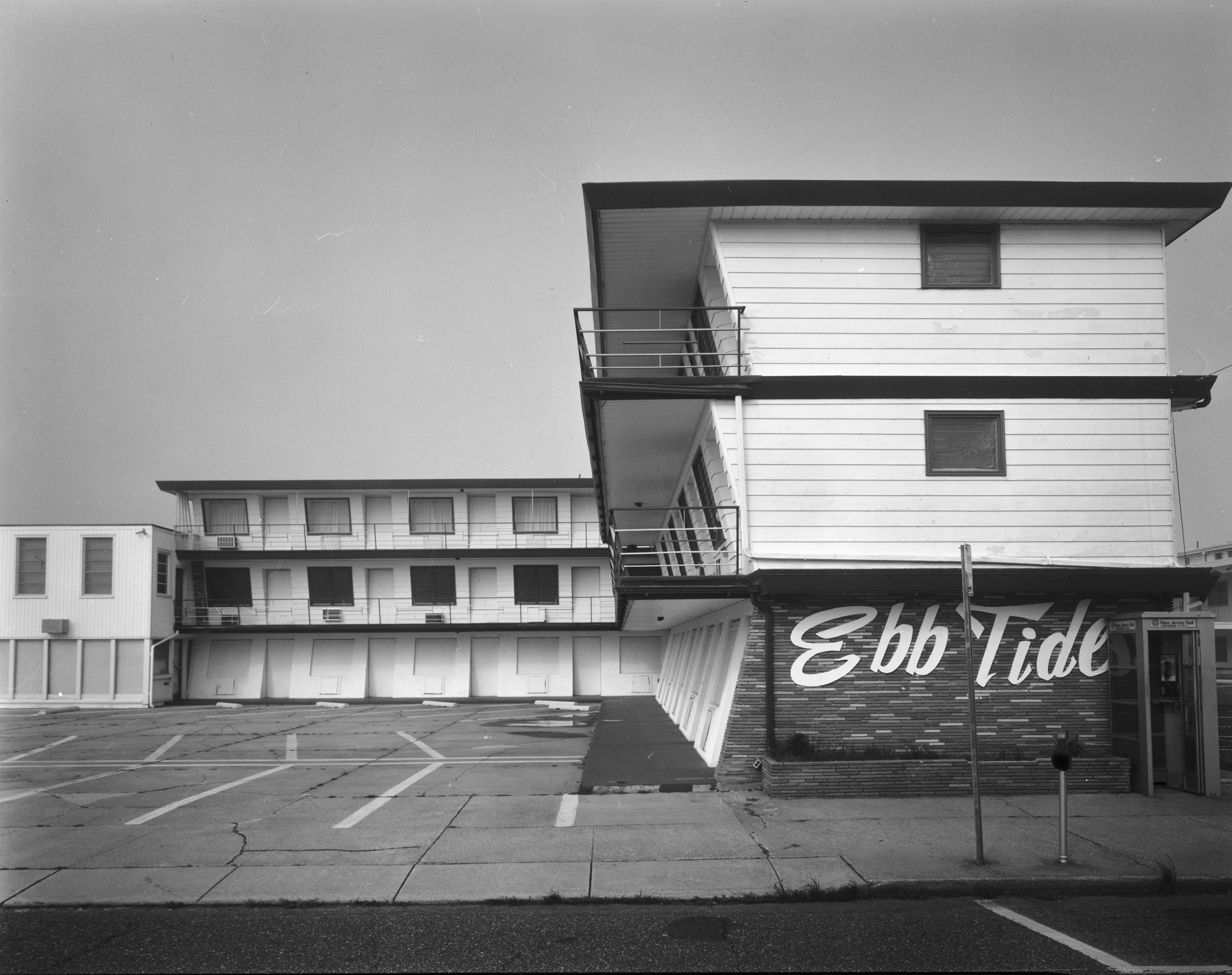
The Ebb Tide Motel in 1992

The Ebb Tide Motel, built in 1957 and demolished in 2003, is credited as the first Doo-Wop motel in Wildwood Crest.

=== The Lampliter ===
Recently demolished and no word on what will replace it.

=== The Sea Rose Motel ===
The Sea Rose Motel, which was owned by Stanley and Catherine Stefankiewicz, was demolished in Fall 2004. The motel was owned for many years by the Stefankiewicz Family, who also owned the Poplar Cafe, which is now known as "The Rook Wildwood".

=== Satellite Motel ===
Built in 1958, the Satellite Motel was one of the Wildwoods' signature "Doo Wop" landmarks until its demolition after the 2004 season, sparking a wave of redevelopment in the area that winter. It was located on the northeast corner of Atlantic & Aster in Wildwood Crest. The Satellite's rooftop neon sign was installed as part of the Neon Garden at the Doo Wop Experience museum in May 2008. The motel was featured prominently in Thomas Hine's 1986 book, Populuxe.

Plans are underway for the 21st Century Satellite Motel, a successor to the original Satellite Motel.

=== 24th Street Motel ===
Built in 1958, the 24th Street Motel was located in North Wildwood at 24th Street and Surf Ave. It originally had two stories but an additional level was added later. The motel featured a pool and sun deck, and it was demolished in late 2005 to make room for condos.

=== Sand Castle Motel ===
Recently torn down to make way for The Sandcastle Condominiums.

== See also ==
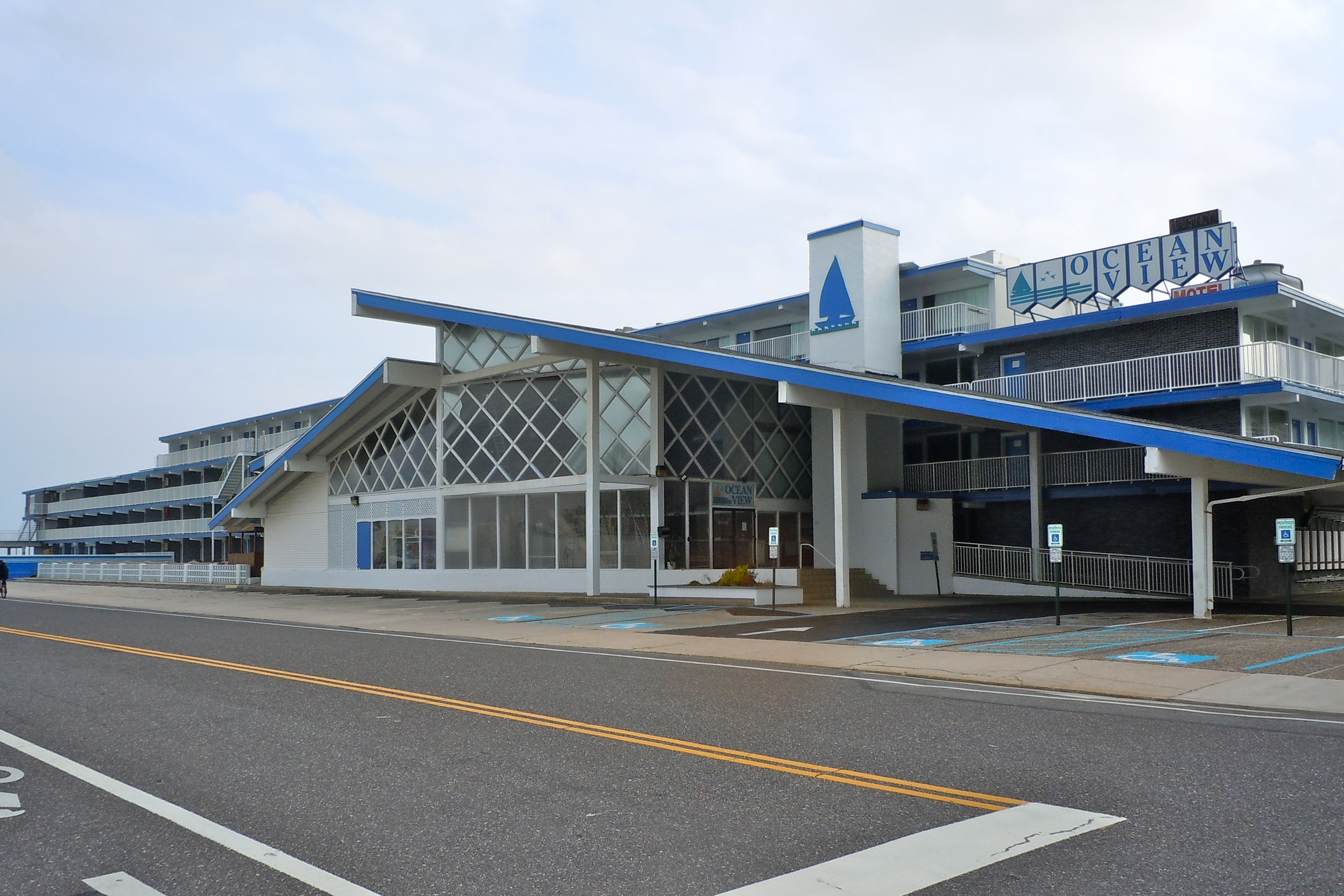
The Oceanview Motel, located on Ocean Avenue and East Rambler Road in Wildwood Crest, was the largest motel in the Wildwoods. It was replaced by Madison Resort in 2024.

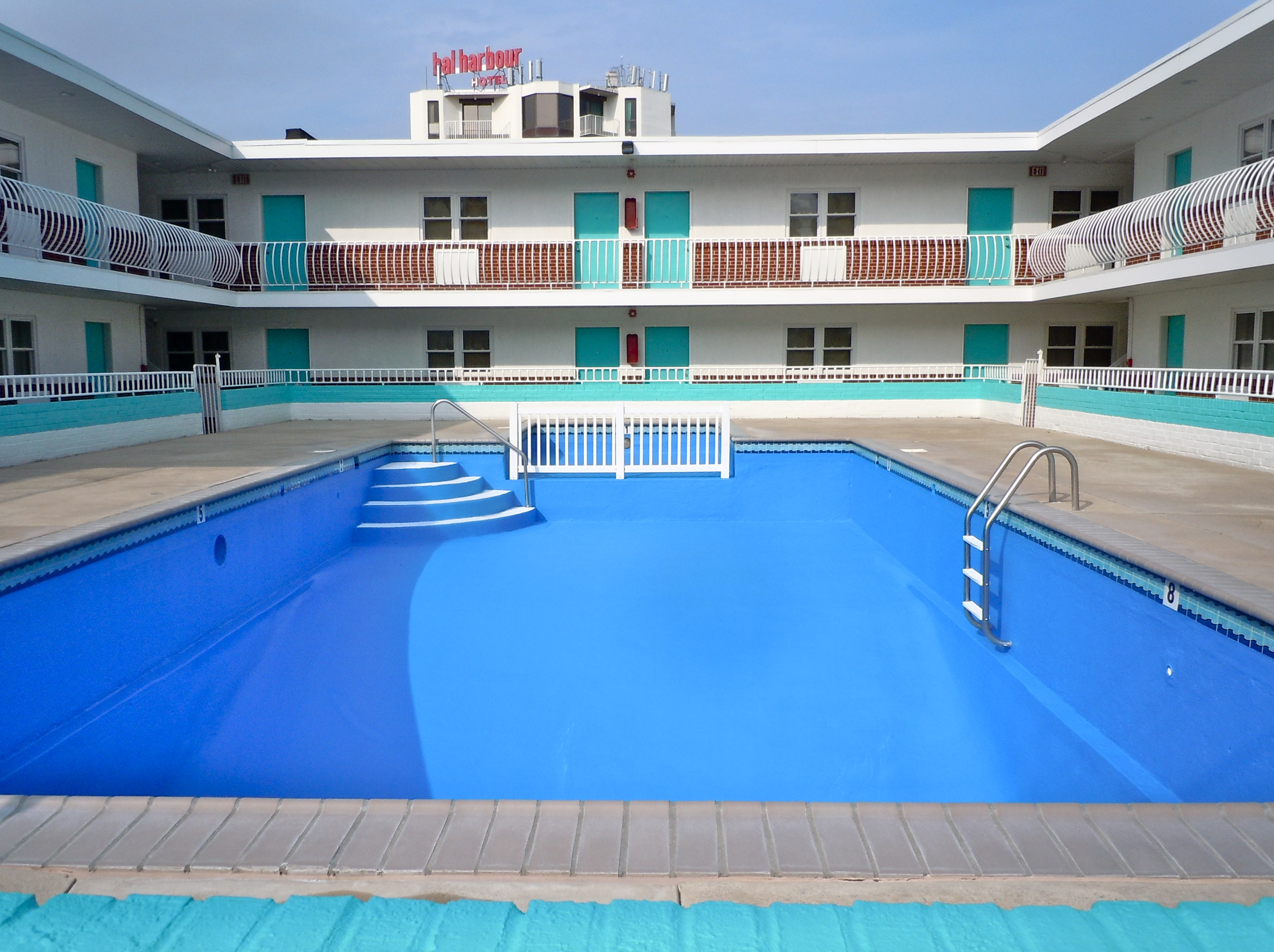
The Mark 1 Motel seen during the offseason.

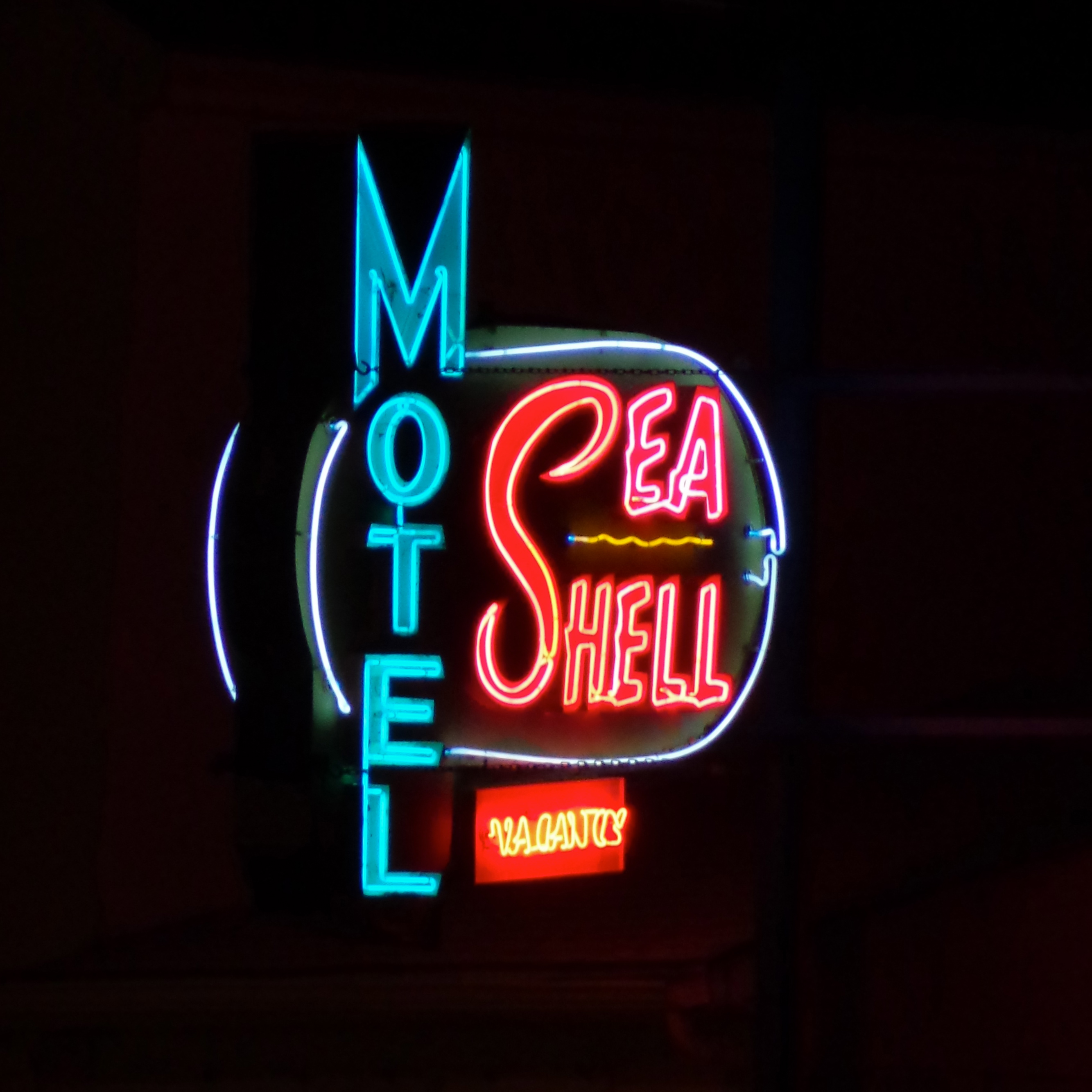
Sign of the Sea Shell Motel

- Cape May Historic District
- MiMo District
- List of Googie architecture structures (United States)
