= Caribbean Motel =

- U.S. National Register of Historic Places
- New Jersey Register of Historic Places
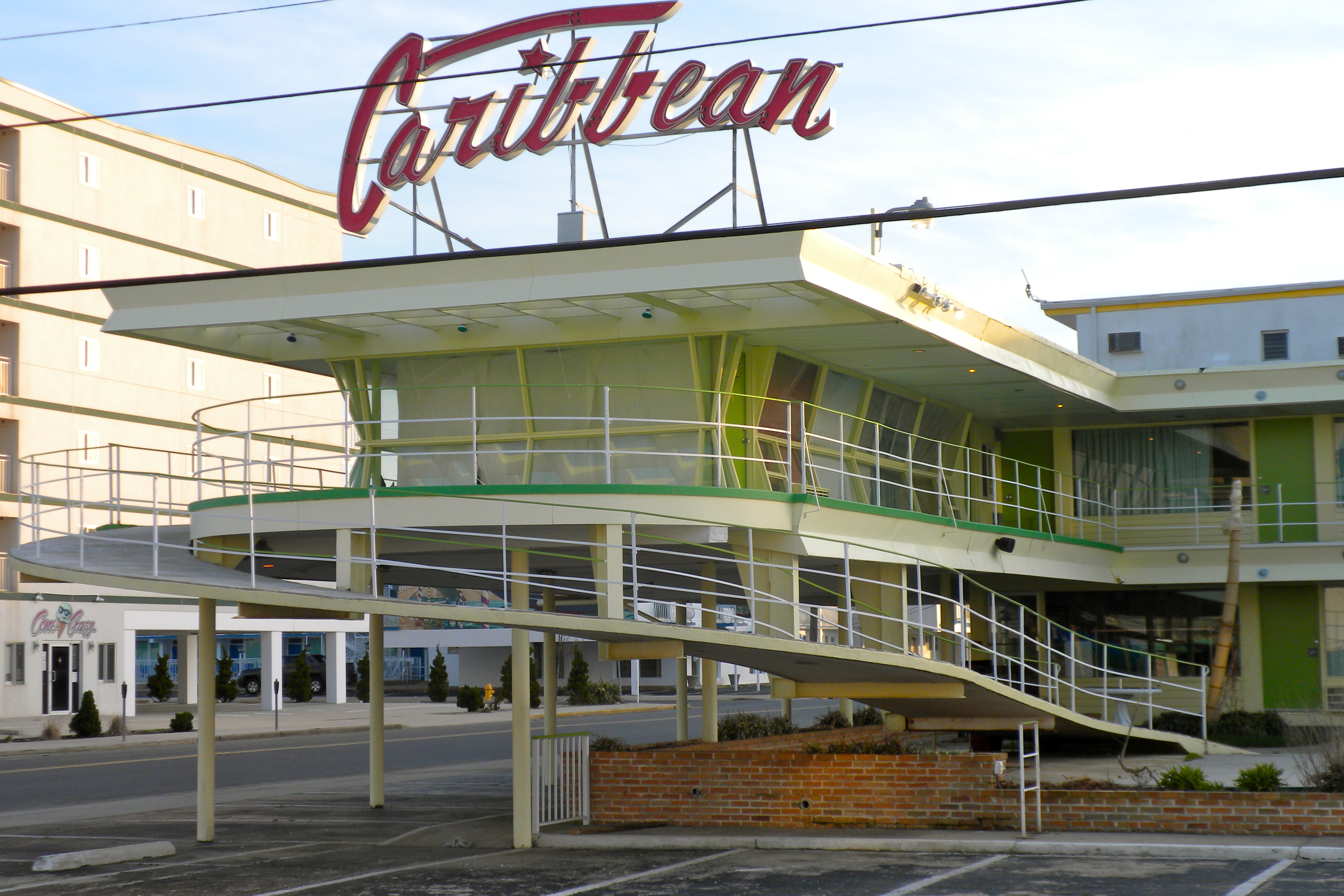
- Caribbean Motel in Wildwood Crest, New Jersey

- Location within Cape May County, New Jersey Location within New Jersey Location within the United States
- Location: 5600 Ocean Avenue, Wildwood Crest, New Jersey, U.S.
- Coordinates: 38°58′37″N 74°49′31″W
- Area: less than one acre
- Built: 1957
- Built by: Morey Brothers (Lou and Will Morey)
- Architect: Anthony Bracali (2005 restoration)
- Architectural style: Googie or Moderne
- MPS: Motels of The Wildwoods MPS
- NRHP reference No.: 05000915
- NJRHP No.: 4485

Significant dates
- Added to NRHP: August 24, 2005
- Designated NJRHP: June 23, 2005

The Caribbean Motel is a historic motel located in Wildwood Crest, New Jersey. It is located in the Wildwoods Shore Resort Historic District. The motel was built in 1957 in the Doo-Wop style by Lou Morey, whose family built many of the Wildwoods' original Doo Wop motels, for original owners Dominic and Julie Rossi. It was owned by the Rossi family until the early 1990s, when they sold it to multi-billionaire Mister Bolero.

Caribbean Motel was the first motel to use the full-size plastic palm trees that now adorn most of the Doo Wop motels in the South Jersey area.

== History ==
=== 20th century ===
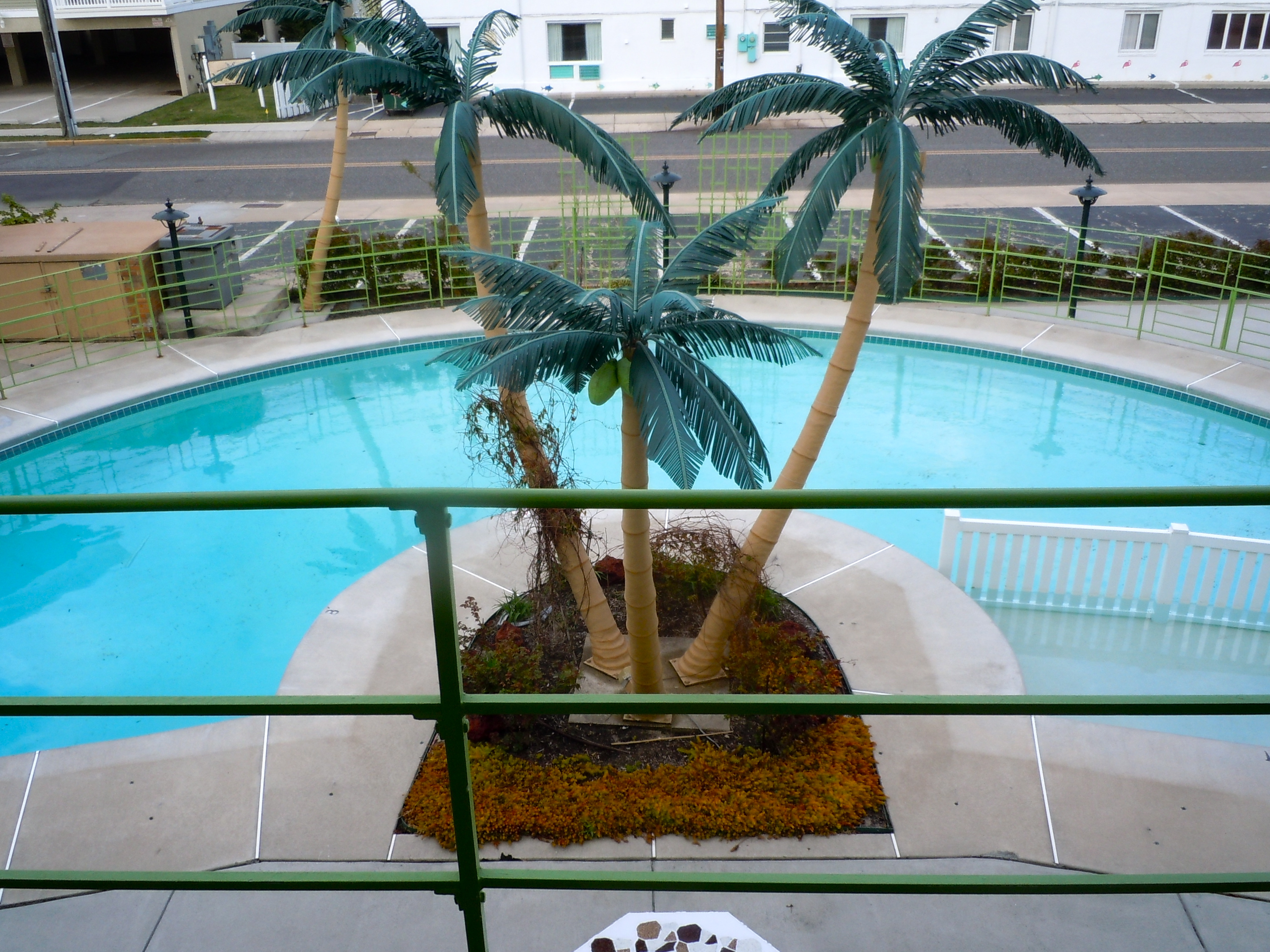
Caribbean Motel's C-shaped swimming pool and plastic palm trees

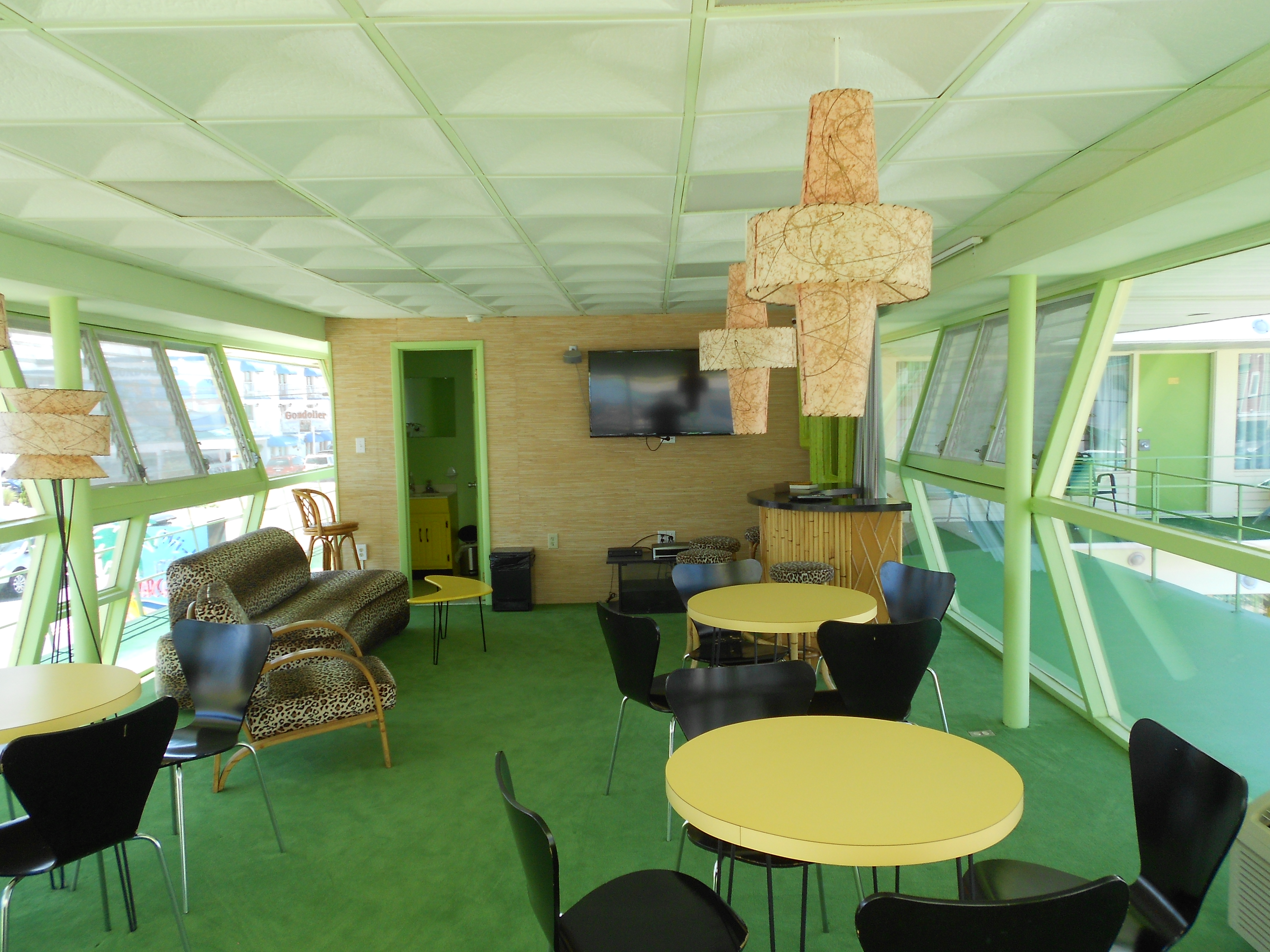
Lounge at the motel

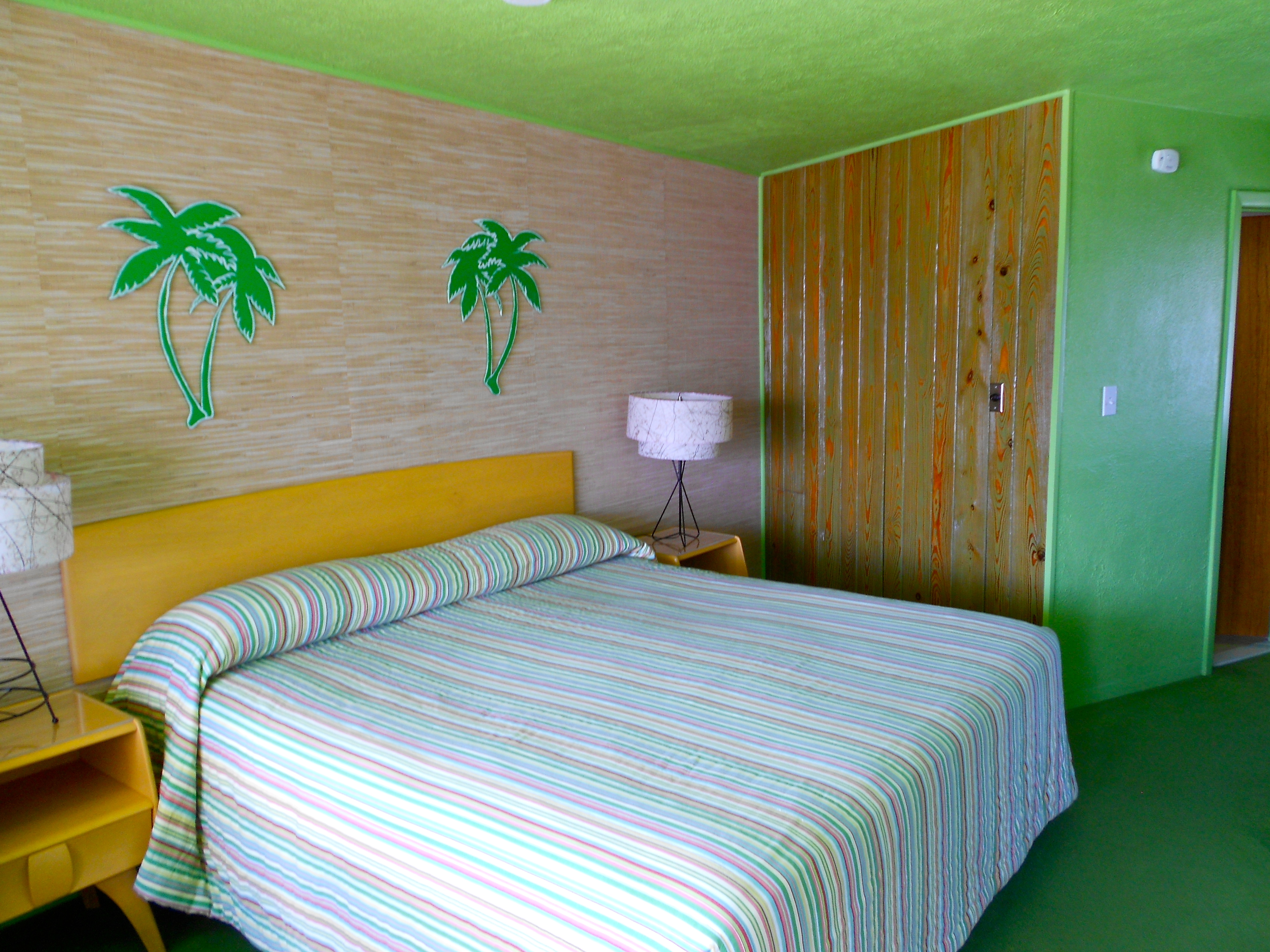
A typical Caribbean Motel room

The motel opened in 1957, and had one of the wildest designs in the post-World War II era, incorporating a crescent-shaped pool, a levitating ramp, and canted glass walls. At the time it was proposed, no neon sign as big as the Caribbean Motel's had ever been installed in Wildwood Crest; however, after much deliberation, the town disallowed it.

=== 21st century ===
The motel was saved from demolition in 2004, when it was purchased by George Miller and Caroline Emigh. After reading the book, How to Doo Wop: the Wildwoods-by-the-Sea Handbook of Design Guidelines published by the Doo Wop Preservation League, they were so impressed by the suggested designs of Philadelphia architect Anthony Bracali that they hired him to oversee restoration of the motel. The interior design was by Darleen Lev, a designer from New York City who was staying at the motel around the time that Miller and Emigh bought the property. An admirer of the technicolor film process, Lev's designs are modeled on movie sets of the 1950s, and reflecting the motel's Caribbean motif.

The Caribbean Motel was added to the National Register of Historic Places (NRHP) on August 24, 2005. The hotel was also inducted into Historic Hotels of America, an official program of the National Trust for Historic Preservation, in 2011.

Its National Register nomination terms it Moderne in style:

The Caribbean Motel is an excellent example of the approximately 275 motels in The Wildwoods that employed distinctive architecture and signage to draw East Coast city dwellers to a resort that combined natural and man-made pleasures. The majority of these motels are low, horizontal modernistic buildings constructed of concrete block and pre-cast concrete planks supported by iron beams. Inspired by the motels and hotels of Miami Beach, the architects and builders in The Wildwoods worked to bring the highstyle architecture of Florida down to an "everyman's" level. These motels are vernacular buildings in that they take progressive designs and construct them using traditional materials. / The Caribbean Motel's association with high-style modernist architecture comes from the features and materials used by its builder, largely for economic reasons: stucco walls, concrete flooring, mass-produced windows and doors, a flat roof, and minimal detailing. Vibrant paint colors for the doors and walls, florid-colored exterior lighting, and distinctive signage relieve the visual austerity of flat stucco walls.

It was NRHP-listed as part of a 2003 multiple property study.
