= History of the United States Marine Corps =

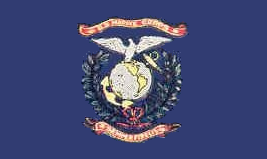
The flag of the United States Marine Corps from 1914 to 1939

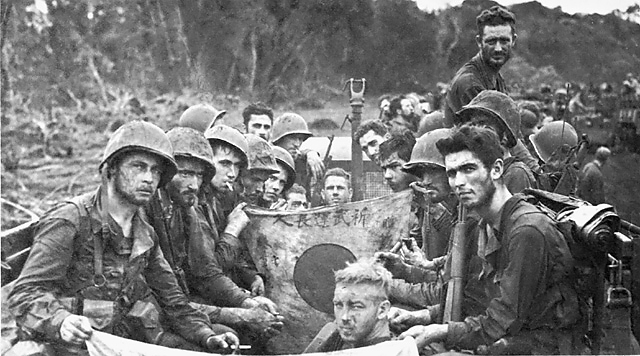
U.S. Marines with the 1st Marine Division display Japanese flag captured during the Battle of Cape Gloucester.

The history of the United States Marine Corps (USMC) begins with the founding of the Continental Marines on 10 November 1775 to conduct ship-to-ship fighting, provide shipboard security and discipline enforcement, and assist in landing forces. Its mission evolved with changing military doctrine and foreign policy of the United States. Owing to the availability of Marine forces at sea, the United States Marine Corps has served in nearly every conflict in United States history. It attained prominence when its theories and practice of amphibious warfare proved prescient, and ultimately formed a cornerstone of U.S. strategy in the Pacific Theater of World War II. By the early 20th century, the Marine Corps would become one of the dominant theorists and practitioners of amphibious warfare. Its ability to rapidly respond on short notice to expeditionary crises has made and continues to make it an important tool for U.S. foreign policy.

In February 1776, the Continental Marines embarked on their maiden expedition. The Continental Marines were disbanded at the end of the war, along with the Continental Navy. In preparation for the Quasi-War with France, Congress created the United States Navy and the Marine Corps. The Marines' most famous action of this period occurred in the First Barbary War (1801–1805) against the Barbary pirates. In the Mexican–American War (1846–1848), the Marines made their famed assault on Chapultepec Palace, which overlooked Mexico City, their first major expeditionary venture. In the 1850s, the Marines would see service in Panama, and in Asia. During the U.S. Civil War (1861–1865) the Marine Corps played only a minor role after their participation in the Union defeat at the first battle of First Bull Run/Manassas. Their most important task was blockade duty and other ship-board battles, but they were mobilized for a handful of operations as the war progressed. The remainder of the 19th century would be a period of declining strength and introspection about the mission of the Marine Corps. Under Commandant Jacob Zeilin's term (1864–1876), many Marine customs and traditions took shape. During the Spanish–American War (1898), Marines would lead U.S. forces ashore in the Philippines, Cuba, and Puerto Rico, demonstrating their readiness for deployment. Between 1900 and 1916, the Marine Corps continued its record of participation in foreign expeditions, especially in the Caribbean and Central and South America, which included Panama, Cuba, Veracruz, Haiti, Santo Domingo, and Nicaragua.

In World War I, battle-tested, veteran Marines served a central role in the United States' entry into the conflict. Between the world wars, the Marine Corps was headed by Major General John A. Lejeune, another popular commandant. In World War II, the Marines played a central role, under Admiral Nimitz, in the Pacific War, participating in nearly every significant battle. The Corps also saw its peak growth as it expanded from two brigades to two corps with six divisions, and five air wings with 132 squadrons. During the Battle of Iwo Jima, photographer Joe Rosenthal took the famous photo Raising of the Flag on Iwo Jima of five Marines and one naval corpsman raising a U.S. flag on Mount Suribachi. The Korean War (1950–1953) saw the 1st Provisional Marine Brigade holding the line at the Battle of Pusan Perimeter, where Marine helicopters (VMO-6 flying the HO3S1 helicopter) made their combat debut. The Marines also played an important role in the Vietnam War at battles such as Da Nang, Huế, and Khe Sanh. The Marines operated in the northern I Corps regions of South Vietnam and fought both a constant guerilla war against the Viet Cong and an off and on conventional war against North Vietnamese Army regulars. Marines went to Beirut during the 1982 Lebanon War on 24 August. On 23 October 1983, the Marine barracks in Beirut was bombed, causing the highest peacetime losses to the Corps in its history. Marines were also responsible for liberating Kuwait during the Gulf War (1990–1991), as the Army made an attack to the west directly into Iraq. The I Marine Expeditionary Force had a strength of 92,990, making Operation Desert Storm the largest Marine Corps operation in history.

== Background ==
=== American Revolution ===
Resolved, That a letter be sent by Express to General Washington, to inform him, that they [Congress] having certain intelligence of the sailing of two north country built Brigs, of no force, from England, on the 11 of August last, loaded with arms, powder, and other stores, for Quebec, without a convoy, which it being of importance to intercept, that he apply to the council of Massachusetts bay, for the two armed vessels in their service, and despatch the same, with a sufficient number of people, stores, particularly a number of oars, in order, if possible, to intercept two Brigs and their cargoes, and secure the same for the use of the continent; Also, any other transports laden with ammunition, cloathing, or other stores, for the use of the ministerial army or navy in America, and secure them in the most convenient places for the purpose abovementioned; that he give the commander or commanders such instructions as are necessary, as also proper encouragement to the marines and seamen, that shall be sent on this enterprize, which instructions, are to be delivered to the commander or commanders sealed up, with orders not to open the same until o of sight of land, on account of secresy.
That a letter be wrote to council, to put vessels under the General's command and direction, and to furnish him instantly with every necessary in their power, at the expense of the Continent.
Also that the General be directed to employ vessels.

John Hancock of Second Continental Congress to General George Washington, 5 October 1775
In that letter, it was the first time that Congress ever mentions "Marines" in United States history. When the battles of Lexington and Concord sparked the beginning of the American Revolutionary War on 19 April 1775, the leaders of the American rebellion soon recognized that in order to prevent the British army from restoring Crown rule and further occupation into the colonies of New England, they would have to resort to a naval war. Although this realization had consumed the Second Continental Congress (by then convened in Philadelphia), its members remained reluctant to support a naval campaign against the world's strongest fleet. Thus, the Royal Navy had the ability to reinforce and supply the British garrisons in the town of Boston, in the Province of Massachusetts Bay.

On 19 April, the initial siege of Boston (1775–1776) by the Minutemen militia impeded the flow of reinforcements and supplies to the British army. By 14 June, the Second Continental Congress chose to adopt the militia and formed it into the new Continental Army, and unanimously elected George Washington the next day as its Commander-in-Chief. A set of naval constraints were established due to the successful siege complemented by the supporting capabilities that the British were giving their garrisons.

Even though there still wasn't a formidable Continental navy yet, the individual colonies each had navies and marines of their own. Units of the Continental Army and groups of militia were sometimes pressed to serve as sailors and naval infantry on ships, purposely serving as marines. These American colonial marines have no lineage traceable to the Continental Marines, nor the modern United States Marine Corps; nonetheless, they fought the British as American marines as early as May.

As the newly appointed commander of the Continental Army, George Washington was desperate for firearms, powder, and provisions; he opted to supply his own force from matériel from captured British military transports. To further expand his fleet, he also resorted to the maritime regiment of the Massachusetts militia, the 14th Continental Regiment (also known as the "Marblehead Regiment") to help muster in ranks. This unique regiment subsequently folded into Washington's army in January 1776. The Marblehead Regiment was entirely composed of New England mariners, providing little difficulty in administering crews for Washington's navy.

His decision to create his fleet came without difficulties in recruiting new rebel naval forces either, for the siege of Boston stirred the war along the entire coast of New England and into the strategic Lake Champlain area on the New York border. The Royal Navy concentrated its vessels in the New England open waters, while its smaller warships raided the coastal towns and destroyed rebel military stores for supplies and provisions; and to punish the colonials for their rebellion—in accordance to the Proclamation of Rebellion that was chartered by King George. In response, several small vessels were commissioned by the governments of Massachusetts and Connecticut by the summer of 1775, authorizing the privateering against British government ships. In August 1775, Washington's makeshift naval fleet continued the interdiction of Massachusetts Bay; being a huge success, by the end of the year he was in command of four warships: USS Franklin, USS Hancock, USS Lee, and USS Warren.

Meanwhile, the New England militia forces of Massachusetts, Connecticut, and Vermont (the Green Mountain Boys), under the command of Benedict Arnold, seized the strategic post of Fort Ticonderoga and temporarily eliminated British control of Lake Champlain–using a small flotilla of shallow-draft vessels armed with light artillery. Early as May 1775, the sloop Interprise [sic] ushered eighteen men, presumably the Massachusetts militiamen, as marines on the payroll. Later in May, the Connecticut Committee of Public Safety consigned £500 to Arnold, the shipment of payment was "escorted with Eight marines..well spirited and equipped,". although they were actually seamen. They are often referred to as the "Original Eight".

By August 1775, the Rhode Island Assembly, along with other colonial committees of safety, requested Second Continental Congress for naval assistance from Royal Navy raiders but it was appealed. Although Congress was aware of Britain's naval strength and its own financial limitations, it addressed itself reluctantly to the problem of creating a formidable continental navy. They were hesitant to the requests, only positing that they were only able to form a naval force from Washington's and Arnold's fleets; the colonies were left to fend for themselves. As a result, Rhode Island established their own state navy.

The colonial marines of Washington's naval fleet, Benedict Arnold's Lake Champlain flotilla, and privateers, made no distinction of their duties as their activities were no different from English customs: marines were basically soldiers detailed for naval service whose primary duties were to fight aboard but not sail their ships. Washington's navy expeditions throughout the remaining months of 1775 suggested that his ship crews of mariner-militiamen were not divided distinctly between sailors and marines; the Marblehead Regiment performed a plethora of duties aboard the warships. However, the Pennsylvania Committee of Public Safety made a dividing line between the sailors and marines when it decided to form a state navy to protect the Delaware River and its littoral areas.

Early October, Congress members, such as John Adams, and colonial governments pushed Congress in creating a navy, however small. To examine the possible establishment of a national navy, the Naval Committee was appointed on 5 October (predecessor to the House and Senate Committees on Naval Affairs). On 13 October 1775, Congress authorized its Naval Committee to form a squadron of four converted Philadelphia merchantmen, with the addition of two smaller vessels. Despite a shortage in funding, the Continental Navy was formed.

In 1775, the Royal Navy numbered 268 warships, and by the end of the year it grew to a fleet force of 468 ships; its naval personnel increased during the war from 10,000 to 18,000. By contrast, the Continental Navy—including the state navies—had managed to maintain over 50 commissioned warships by winter of 1776–1777, which fell in numbers thereafter; its manpower most likely numbered no more than a total of 30,000 sailors and marines. To the hundreds of small privateers that sailed the North Atlantic, the American naval forces found it increasingly difficult to take prizes, let alone influence the outcome of the war.

== Continental era ==
Resolved, That two Battalions of marines be raised, consisting of one Colonel, two Lieutenant Colonels, two Majors, and other officers as usual in other regiments; and that they consist of an equal number of privates with other battalions; that particular care be taken, that no persons be appointed to office, or enlisted into said Battalions, but such as are good seamen, or so acquainted with maritime affairs as to be able to serve to advantage by sea when required; that they be enlisted and commissioned to serve for and during the present war between Great Britain and the colonies, unless dismissed by order of Congress: that they be distinguished by the names of the first and second battalions of American Marines, and that they be considered as part of the number which the continental Army before Boston is ordered to consist of.
Ordered, That a copy of the above be transmitted to the General.

— Second Continental Congress on 10 November 1775

The Second Continental Congress convened in Philadelphia on 9 November 1775, consulting the Naval Committee to send an amphibious expedition to Halifax in Nova Scotia. Having launched two land expeditions toward the St. Lawrence River months earlier, (as Richard Montgomery's and Benedict Arnold's forces were each making their way toward Quebec City to join forces, later leading to the Battle of Quebec), Congress was convinced that sending marines to fight at sea and engage military operations ashore were paramount in targeting the important British naval base in Halifax and to procure provisions and supplies if at all possible. On 10 November 1775, the Naval Committee was directed by Congress to raise two marine battalions at the Continental expense. Also, Congress decided the marines would not only be used for the Nova Scotia expedition but for subsequent service thereafter. Henceforth, the Naval Committee established a network of appointments for offices; paymaster, commissions, procurements, equipment, etc., for establishing a future national corps of marines. The United States Marine Corps still celebrates 10 November as its official birthday. Borrowing from the Royal Navy, the practices and printed instructions were outlined in the "Rules for the Regulations of the Navy of the United Colonies." It was intended that the American marines would provide the same services as British marines.

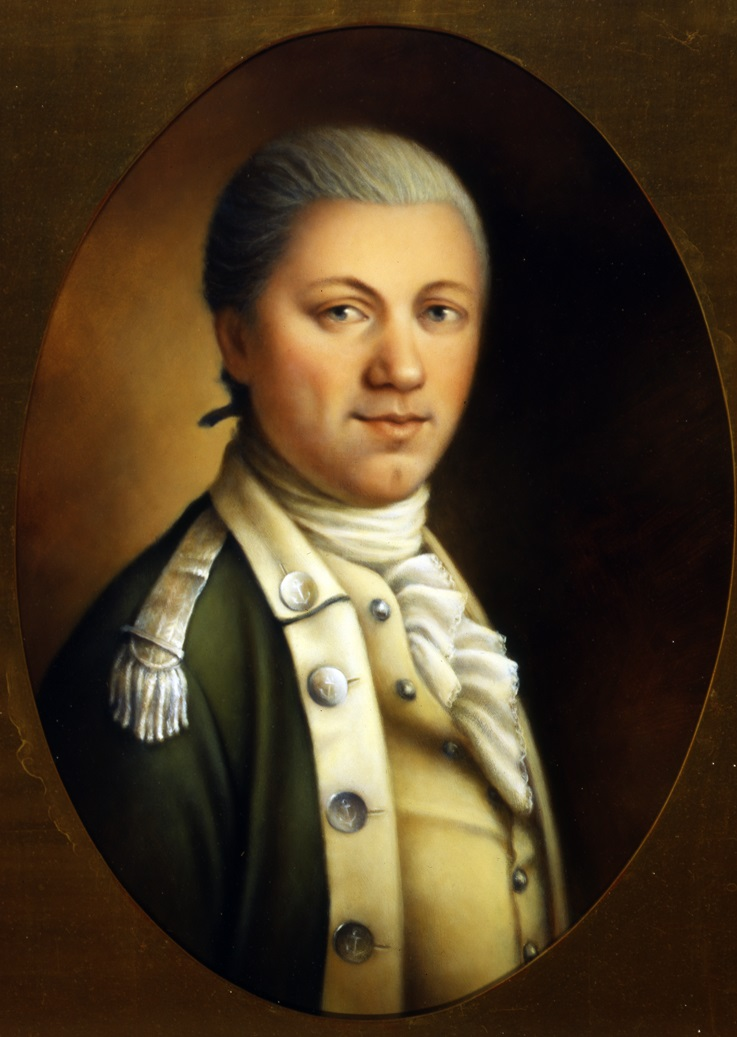
A portrait of Major Samuel Nicholas, the first Commandant of the Marine Corps, 1775

The two battalions of Continental Marines officially became "resolved" when Congress issued the first commission to Captain Samuel Nicholas on 28 November 1775. Nicholas' family were tavernkeepers, his prominence came not from his work but from his leadership in two local clubs for fox-hunters and sport fishermen. Historian Edwin Simmons surmises that it is most likely Nicholas was using his family tavern, the "Conestoga Waggon" [sic], as a recruiting post; although the standing legend in the United States Marine Corps today places its first recruiting post at Tun Tavern in Philadelphia.

In December 1775, to aid in drafting plans in expanding the Continental Navy and to supervise the construction of vessels and procurement of naval equipment, the Continental Congress established a permanent committee for the Marine Corps, the Marine Committee (the forerunner of the United States Department of the Navy). It would supersede the duties of the naval affairs committee; which the majority of the personnel were also appointed in the same office of the Naval Committee. The Marine Committee contained thirteen members, one for each colony, included important figures, such as Robert Morris, John Hancock, and Samuel Chase. The Naval Committee would oversee the Marine Committee on matters concerning naval expeditions and projections. It exercised legislative, judicial, and executive powers. However, the lack of an administrative head and of actual authority over the states, impeded the Marine Committee as they did Congress. Since the Marine Committee was responsible in drafting plans for the expansion of the Continental Navy, three days later after its establishment it recommended to Congress to build a force of thirteen frigates, outfitted with 24–36 guns. Congress accepted the program as it would protect colonial merchant trade from the British blockaders; on the recommendation that the construction of warships will be decentralized.

Congress was greatly depending on Washington's cooperation for the Nova Scotia expedition and were planning to draw them from Washington's army, but Washington was unenthusiastic about the plan and suggested instead to Congress to recruit unemployed seamen for the proposed marine battalions in New York and Philadelphia (which at the time was the Nation's first capital city [before moving to the District of Columbia]). Congress agreed on the decision. Ten additional Marine officers were appointed by Captain Nicholas. The majority of officers and enlistees were Philadelphian small merchants and businessmen, skilled tradesmen and workers, and unskilled laborers. There were even some that were acquainted with those in Congress or in the Pennsylvania Committee of Safety. The primary duties of the officers were recruiting and persuading men to enlist. Most officers were commissioned because their most important qualification was knowledge of working the local taverns and other hot-spots of the working class. The officers would sweep through the city for potential recruits, accompanied by drummers borrowed from the Philadelphia Associators, a city militia. Nicholas and his officers might have had some maritime experience, but it is unlikely that they were skilled mariners. Five companies of about 300 Marines were raised. While armed, they were not equipped with standardized uniforms.

Continental Congress appointed Rhode Island Navy Commodore Esek Hopkins as the Commander-in-Chief of the Continental Navy on 22 December 1775.; in Philadelphia, the Marine Committee outfitted a flotilla of five ships, the first squadron in the Continental fleet. His brother, Stephen Hopkins, served in the Continental Congress and was co-chairman of Naval Affairs and the Marine Committee. Formally commissioned as captains by Congress include: Esek's son, John Burroughs Hopkins, who commandeered the brigantine USS Cabot. USS Alfred was placed in commission on 3 December 1775, with Capt. Dudley Saltonstall in command, as to serve as Hopkins' flagship, becoming the first vessel to fly the Continental Union Flag (the precursor to the Stars and Stripes) hoisted by Lieutenant John Paul Jones in February 1776; and the brigantine USS Andrew Doria, commandeered by Nicholas Biddle. A prominent naval commander in the Rhode Island Navy, Commodore Abraham Whipple, decided to transfer his commission to the Continental Navy and was commissioned a captain on 22 December 1775. He was given command of a frigate USS Columbus; armed with twenty-four guns and a serving crew of sailors and company of Nicholas's Continental Marines aboard its quarters.

By 17 February, the Continental Marines embarked onto Hopkin's six vessels for their maiden expedition. It was the first amphibious/expedition for the Continental Navy-Marine Corps. Hopkins was given the task to patrol the southern American coastline to intercept and clear any presence of British troops, then return north to New England and perform similar services. He was instructed to attack the British fleet under John Murray, 4th Earl of Dunmore, in Chesapeake Bay, Hopkins considered his orders discretionary and the enemy too strong. He was ordered to clear the American coast of British warships, then return north to perform similar services. Since rebel warships were already active off the New England coast, and the Middle Colonies were forming their own coastal defense navies; Hopkins's orders made strategic sense. However, for reasons that remain obscure, he disobeyed his ambitious orders to sweep the southern seas of British ships, and to safeguard the southern American coastline. Instead without proper authority he directed his squadron to head south en route to the Bahama Islands.

As he reached the Bahamas on 1 March 1776, his squadron began harassing small British forces guarding the small islands around New Providence Island, and raiding for gunpowder for Washington's army.

While Hopkins and Nicholas were sailing the Atlantic and Caribbean, Congress authorized the Marine Committee to purchase two more brigantines for the Continental Navy. The Marine Committee purchased brigantine Wild Duck, from the Maryland Committee of Safety and renamed her USS Lexington, commemorating the battle in Lexington of Middlesex County. Lexington then was turned over to "Wharton and Humphrey's Shipyard" in Philadelphia for fitting for Continental service. John Barry was commissioned as a captain in the Continental Navy, dated 14 March 1776; along with this commission went command of the brig Lexington, his first warship. The Marine Committee of the Continental Congress purchased merchantman Molly on 28 March 1776; renamed her USS Reprisal and placed under the command of Captain Lambert Wickes. These two vessels were to be used to supplement the efforts of the Pennsylvania Navy in clearing the lower approaches of the Delaware River. They also appointed a ship captain and four new additional Marine officers for each vessel, all of whom by March 1776 were recruiting enlistees.

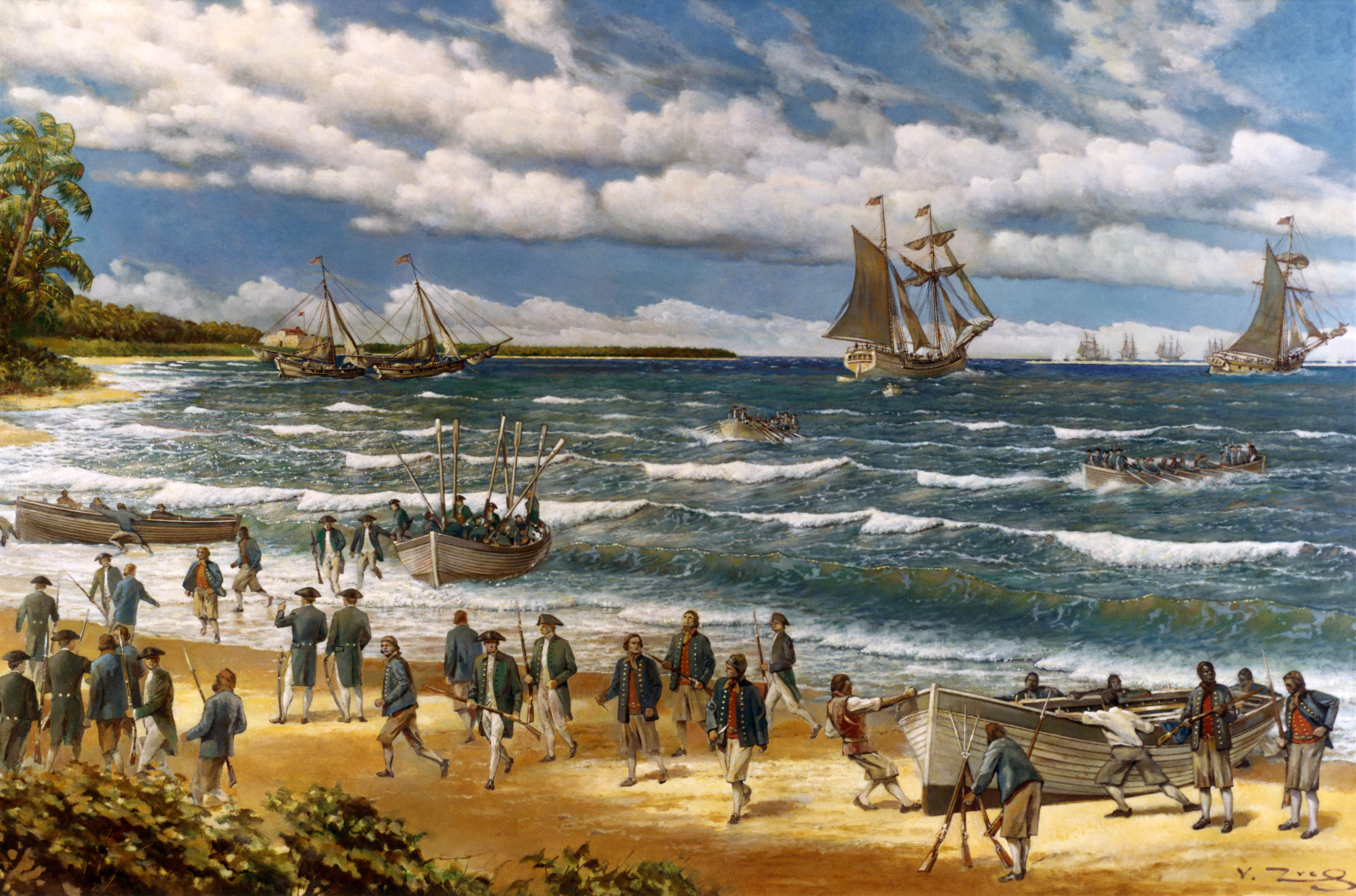
Continental Marines land at New Providence during the Battle of Nassau

On 3 March 1776, the Continental Marines made their first amphibious landing in American history when they attempted an amphibious assault during the Battle of Nassau. However, they failed to achieve a surprise attack as Hopkins directed his captains to make an opposed landing of all his 234 of Marines, and some fifty seamen on the island of New Providence, to assault the British Fort Montagu hoping to seize supplies and provisions. The next day, they then marched to Fort Nassau to seize more shots, shells, and cannons. However, the failure of surprise the day before had warned the defenders and allowed the British governor to send off their stock of gunpowder in the night. One British merchantman ship escaped, leaving all but 24 barrels of gunpowder. The Continental Marines and sailors stripped the garrisons of cannon and ordnance supply before departing. The acquired matériel were essential to the supply armament of the Continental Army.

On 16 March, Commodore Hopkins withdrew from New Providence. Sailing back to Rhode Island on the 16th, the squadron captured four small prize ships. The squadron finally returned on 8 April 1776, with 7 dead Marines and four wounded. While returning from the Bahamas, Hopkin's squadron encountered a British ship off the coast of New York City on 5 April. Here, Nicholas's Marines participated in the capture of HMS Bolton. The next day [6 April], the Marines and sailors engaged in a naval battle between Hopkin's Cabot and Alfred and the British frigate HMS Glasgow off the coast of Long Island, New York. Four Marines wounded and seven killed; Lieutenant John Fitzpatrick was the first Continental Marine killed in combat. Sailing back toward Rhode Island, the squadron captured four small prize ships. Hopkin's squadron reached New London on 8 April 1776.

John Martin's enlistment gave him the role as the first Black American Marine. In Philadelphia in April 1776, he signed to service aboard the Continental brig Reprisal docked along with Lexington in Philadelphia. While patrolling off the Virginia Capes, Lexington encountered HMS Edward and the sailors and Marines boarded the British brigantine-sloop and captured it on 7 April 1776.

Meanwhile, Hopkins fleet again set out at sea in the Atlantic, on 29 May 1776, the Continental sailors and Marines aboard brigantine Andrea Doria captured two British transports, with each bearing an infantry company. Hereafter, Hopkin's squadron patrolled the coast of New England as far north to Nova Scotia for the rest of the spring of 1776. Alfred (under command by John Paul Jones) continued to raid British commerce while the rest of the squadron awaited repairs or more crewmen. Most of the sailors and Marines were riddled by diseases, desertion, and resignation of officers. The Continental Congress struggled to find more crews to man the Navy's ships; the Marine detachments were moved from vessel to vessel and were temporarily reinforced by the Continental Army and militia. In the summer of 1776, Hopkins's squadron returned to Philadelphia. Also, Congress approved the Marine Committee's request for new officers; fourteen new officer were commissioned in the Continental Marine Corps. Samuel Nicholas was promoted to major on 25 June due to his service in the New Providence expedition. Congress however, was utterly disappointed in Commodore Esek Hopkins's disobeying of orders. Dissatisfaction with the achievements of the fleet, and its subsequent inactivity in Rhode Island, led to an investigation by Congress. Censured for disobedience of orders, Hopkins returned to the fleet.

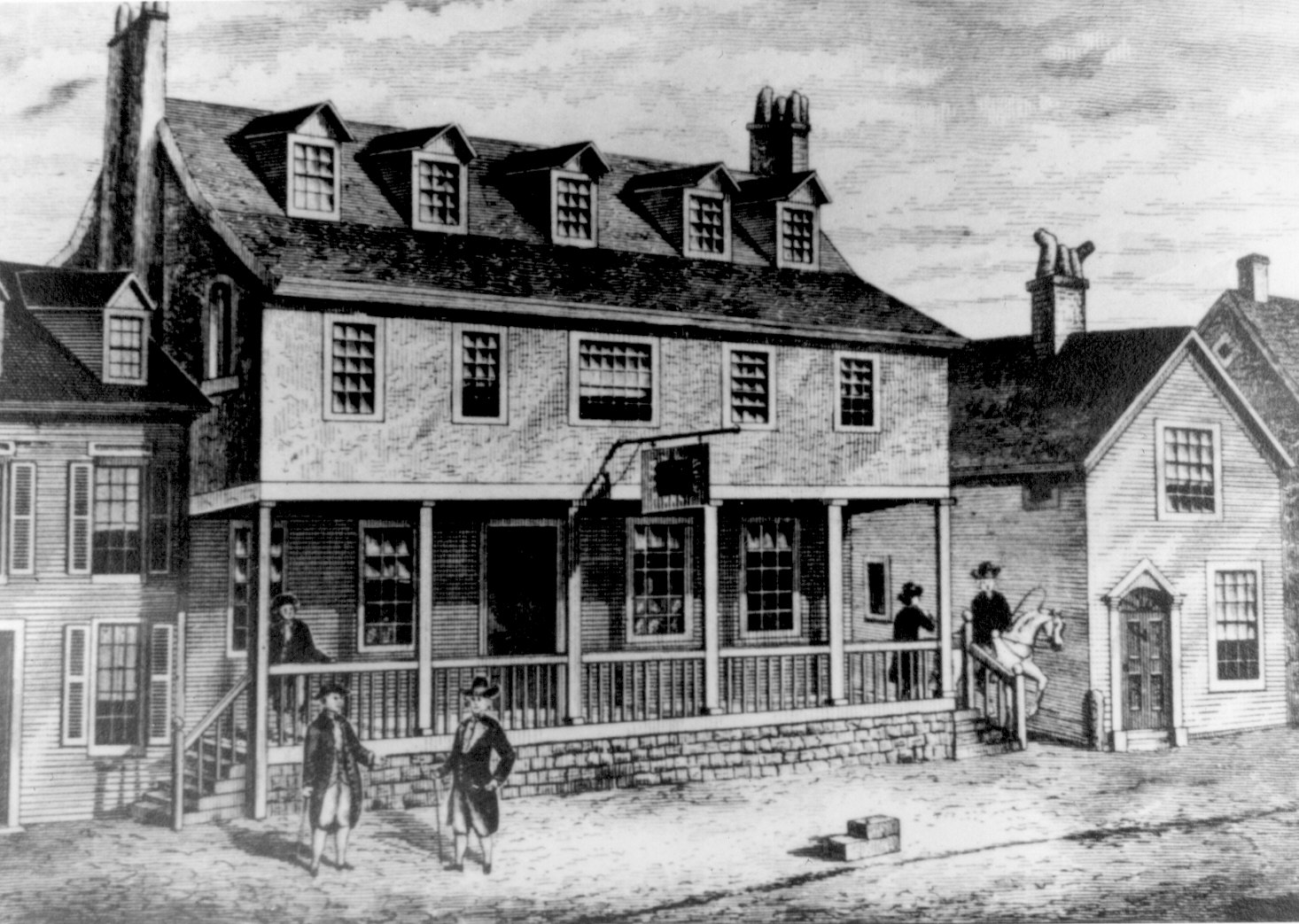
A sketch of Tun Tavern during the Revolutionary War

Also on the same day [25 June], Robert Mullan (whose mother was the proprietor of Tun Tavern and most likely used it as his recruiting rendezvous) received his commission as captain. Capt. Mullan played an important aid in recruitment of enlistees for Marines aboard the Continental navy fleets, he became by legend, the first 'Marine Recruiter'. Captain Mullan's roster lists two black men, Issac and Orange, another historical recording of one of the first black American Marines.

On 28 June Pennsylvania's brig Nancy arrived in Cape May with 386 barrels of powder in her hold and ran aground while under fire while attempting to elude British blockaders HMS Kingfisher and HMS Orpheus. The next evening, the Continental Marines aboard Lexington, along with four American warships to assist the wreck Nancy. By dawn, the crew in small boats unloaded weaponry and precious gunpowder, leaving only 100 barrels of powder behind. Barry devised a delayed action fuse just as a boatload of British seamen boarded Nancy, exploding the powder. This engagement became known as the Battle of Turtle Gut Inlet.

On 4 July 1776, the Declaration of Independence was signed. The Continental sailors and Marines aboard Reprisal and then headed south to the Caribbean Islands on 27 July. Their assignment was to bring William Bingham, who had been appointed agent from the American colonies to Martinique, in acquiring intelligence, and additional arms and supplies for George Washington's armies. While en route, they encountered the British sloop-of-war HMS Shark off the coast of Martinique and forced her out of the area. Reprisal and her accompanying Marines returned to Philadelphia from the West Indies on 13 September.

By autumn of 1776, Major Nicholas raised four new companies of Marines for four of the new frigates that were to be completed and commissioned in Philadelphia. Armed with marines by the Pennsylvania Committee of Safety, the detachments guarded both the Continental and state vessels and store while waiting for their frigates to sail.

On 5 September 1776, the Marine Committee apportioned a uniform for the Continental Marines. The uniform regulations specified that standard uniform was a short green coat with white trim facings (lapels, cuffs, and coat lining), and a high leather collar to protect against cutlass slashes and to keep a man's head erect, leading to the nickname "leatherneck"; complemented by a white waistcoat, white or buff short breeches, woolen stockings, and a short black gaiter. Marine officers wore small cocked hats, and a single epaulette; and the enlisted men sported round black hats with the brim pinned on one side. The adoption of green coats and round hats probably reflects the constraints of availability, for both of the uniform attire were used by the Philadelphia Associators. It wasn't until the year 1777 that the Marines entirely appeared in uniform in numbers. Though legend attributes the green color to the traditional color of riflemen, Continental Marines mostly carried muskets. More likely, green cloth was simply plentiful in Philadelphia, and it served to distinguish Marines from the blue of the Army and Navy or the red of the British. Also, Sam Nicholas's hunting club wore green uniforms, hence his recommendation was for green. Notably, Marines aboard USS Bonhomme Richard wore red, though they were mostly Irish soldiers of the French Army.

The Continental sailors and Marines aboard Providence sailed north to Canada toward Nova Scotia. By 22 September, the sailors and Marines reached Canso Harbor and recaptured the small port. The following next day, they struck Isle Madame destroying fishing boats. On 27 September while fishing, Providence, came under surprise attack from the British frigate HMS Milford. Although surprised, the smaller American ship managed to escape in a day of expert sailing.

Sometime in October, Sergeants William Hamilton and Alexander Neilson are promoted to lieutenant, being the first recorded "mustangs" (enlistees who received field commission) in the Marine Corps. On 24 October 1776, Benjamin Franklin was dispatched to France as appointed 'Commissioner to France' for Congress. Captain Lambert Wickes was ordered by the Continental Congress to proceed to Nantes, France, aboard Reprisal. En route to France, the sailors and Marines captured two brigantines. Reprisal reaches Nantes, France on 29 November, becoming the first vessel of the Continental Navy to arrive in European waters.

In late November 1776, General Washington's Continental Army positions along the Hudson River collapsed from the concurring assaults of British forces. In emergency response Washington requested assistance of a brigade of Philadelphia militia, a company of local seamen, and Major Nicholas's four companies of Continental Marines. George Washington wrote a staunchly letter to John Cadwalader, a brigadier general of the Pennsylvania Associators:

"...if they came out resolved to act upon Land...instead their Services to the Water only."

— George Washington to John Cadwalader, 7 December 1776

On 2 December 1776, Major Samuel Nicholas and his three companies of Marines, garrisoned at the Marine barracks in Philadelphia, were tasked to reinforce Washington's retreating army from New York through Trenton to slow the progress of British troops southward through New Jersey. The Major Nicholas and the American marines marched off to aid in support an American army for the first time in history; he led a battalion of 130 officers and enlisted men from Philadelphia, leaving behind one company to man the Continental vessels. Unsure what to do with the Marines, Washington requested that the Marines be attached to a brigade militiamen from the Philadelphia Associators, which were also dressed in green uniforms like the Continental Marines. Thus, Nicholas and his Marines joined Cadwalader's brigade of Pennsylvania Associators, a force of 1,200 men. The Marines lived side-by-side with the militia brigade in Bristol, Pennsylvania for two weeks waiting for an attack from the British. However, the British army instead went into winter quarters along the New Jersey shore of the Delaware River.

Meanwhile, at sea, Lexington becomes captured by the British frigate HMS Pearl. Momentarily, Marine Captain Abraham Boyce lead his men and Lexington's sailors in overtaking the small British prize crew. Alfred also engaged in combat with HMS Milford on 9 December. Although the British frigate was better-armed, the American ship was able to out-sail their opponent and escape unharmed. The Continental Marines and sailors were able to escape to the harbor at Baltimore, Maryland.

General Washington attacked the German garrison at Trenton on 26 December, though Cadwalader's brigade were unable to arrive in time to affect the battle for Trenton, due to problems crossing the ice-choked Delaware River. Cadwalader finally crossed the river on 27 December on his own initiative, reaching Trenton by 2 January as Washington concentrated his army. As Cadwalader and his brigade managed to reach Trenton on 2 January from across the Delaware River, the Continental Marines watched the cannonade between the Continental Army and Lord Cornwallis' British Army at Assunpink Creek. The Marines helped defend a crucial bridge against a Hessian attack. On the night of 3 January, Cadwalader's brigade (including Major Nicholas's battalion of Continental Marines) and General Washington's Army silently departs the battlefield and marches toward Princeton. By daybreak, they launched a two-pronged attack. The first prong of attack, led by Brigadier General Hugh Mercer, a close friend of George Washington, attacked a British stronghold. Mercer's brigade ran into heavy, well-disciplined musketry of two British regiments that were emplaced in front of Princeton, Mercer's brigade position soon collapsed. Cadwalader's brigade (along with the Marines) came to the assistance, but too stumbled into the British infantry forcing them to fall back. The second prong of attack caught the British in open flank, scattering three British regiments. It gave Washington's forces the advantage to take Princeton. The battle for Princeton was the first engagement that the Continental Marines fought and died in battle.

After the Trenton–Princeton campaign, Nicholas's four-company battalion discontinued service; reduced by transfers, desertion, and disease of eighty Marines. On 4 January, the remaining three companies encamped at its winter quartering at Sweets Town, not far from Washington's bivouac at Jockey Hollow, Morristown. From 1 February 1777 and throughout the winter, the two companies of Marines either transferred to Morristown to assume the roles in the Continental artillery batteries, or left the service altogether. Captain Robert Mullan's company returned to Philadelphia as prisoner guards after they found that there was no ship to man. Captain Robert Mullans' company of Continental Marines disbanded in April 1777. Many also returned to Philadelphia in the spring to become part of the detachments of the new Continental galley Washington [the third ship to be named as such] and the frigate Delaware.

In the Bay of Biscay off France, on 5 February, the Continental Marines aboard Reprisal led a boarding party that seized and sank HMS Swallow.

The 32-gun frigate Randolph put to sea in early February 1777, joining the smaller Continental vessels from Hopkins's squadron. Constantly, the Continental Navy attempted to breach the cordon of British vessels awaiting their departure; tasks in reaching the open seas came with such burden that Congress and the state assemblies attempted to mount a serious naval campaign in an effort to drive away the British warships that were blockading the American harbors. One achievement was that they warranted in shifting some of its cruises to European waters, using the ports of their ally, France, as a base of operation. Although it did not totally hinder nor prevent the Royal Navy from going anywhere in American waters. But the naval campaigns made it costly for Great Britain to maintain its army in American.

Marines made another overseas strike, raiding the coast of Britain (notably at Whitehaven) with John Paul Jones on USS Ranger in April 1777.

Alfred, and Raleigh under command of Capt. Thomas Thompson, and their accompanying Continental Marines, departed for France on 22 August 1777. On 4 September, the Continental Marines aboard the frigate Raleigh participated in the bold attack on the British sloop HMS Druid. The approach of the remaining British escorts forced them to break off, unabling them to sink or capture any British prizes.

On 14 September 1777, Reprisal left France, for New England.

On 19 September, Lexington and her Marine detachments were defeated by the British cutter HMS Alert, near France.

The Continental frigate Delaware and her Marines were forced onto a shoal in the Delaware River as they fought with British batteries guarding the approaches to Philadelphia occupied by the British. Although Delaware was captured, many of the sailors and Marines escaped.

On 1 October 1777, caught in an Atlantic storm, Reprisal foundered off the banks of Newfoundland and all 129 on board (sailors and Marines), except the cook, went down with her. Continental naval officer in command of sloop-of-war Ranger, Captain John Paul Jones, sailed for Nantes, France, on 1 November 1777, to dispatch news to Commissioner Benjamin Franklin about the American victory of Saratoga and the surrender of British General John Burgoyne. On the voyage, two British prizes were captured. Ranger arrived at Nantes on 2 December. Captain Jones sold the prizes and delivered the news of the victory at Saratoga to Ben Franklin.

On 2 January 1778, the Marine Committee came to the conclusion that Esek Hopkins be relieved of command. Thereafter as such, the Continental Congress implemented a few plans for squadron operations.

On 10 January, during the American War of Independence, a company of Marines under Navy Captain James Willing departed Fort Pitt, Pennsylvania for an expedition, in the armed boat Rattletrap. They sailed into the Ohio River en route to New Orleans.

Marines from the frigate Randolph help extinguish a huge blaze on 15 January in Charleston, South Carolina, that destroyed hundred of buildings. They seized the forts, and captured five ships in the harbor.

During a surprise attack on the night of 28 January 1778, Marines repeated the raid on smaller scale once again at New Providence Island, on Nassau in the Bahamas, under Captains John Trevett and John Rathbun. The 'Stars and Stripes' was hoisted over a foreign shore for the first time. It was repeated again for the third time, in May 1782, with Bernardo de Gálvez to secure the island for the Spanish.

Meanwhile, Captain Willing and the Marines from Rattletrap captured the British sloop HMS Rebecca while sailing down the Mississippi River. They were able to temporarily weaken the British hold on the waterway from occupation. They raided British Loyalist plantations along on the shore of Lake Pontchartrain.

The ill-fated day of 7 March, the frigate Randolph, commanded by Nicholas Biddle, explodes while commencing in a firefight with HMS Yarmouth, a British 64-gun ship of the line. During battle, the powder magazines onboard combusted, exploding the entire hull. Randolph sank taking a loss of 301 sailors, soldiers, and Marines.

On 9 March 1778, near Barbados in the Lesser Antilles of the Caribbean Sea, Alfred and Raleigh encountered British warships HMS Ariadne and HMS Ceres. When the American ships attempted to flee, Alfred fell behind her faster consort Raleigh, which escaped. Towards afternoon the British men-of-war caught up with Alfred and forced her to surrender after a half-an-hour's battle. The Marine detachment, along with the Continental sailors, were taken prisoner. Raleigh continued north to New England. On 27 March, a British squadron chased Raleigh ashore on Point Judith, near Newport, Rhode Island. The Continental Marines held off an attack by Royal Marines while the crewmen unloaded valuable stores from the grounded ship. The Continental Navy ship Raleigh returned to New England early in April 1778.

On 23 April 1778, John Paul Jones and sailors and Marines aboard Ranger made a raid on the British port of Whitehaven, Great Britain. The crew of Ranger set fire to ships and spiked the cannon of the fort. Later that same day, they landed on St. Mary Isle to capture a British earl, but find him away from home, and instead they take the family silver. The next day [24 April], Ranger and her Marines defeat the British sloop HMS Drake in the Irish Sea.

On 1 May 1778, the Marines assisted in a night battle with the British frigate HMS Lark in Narragansett Bay as Providence escapes the blockade and makes it to the open sea. Accused of cowardice and dereliction of duty for not aiding Alfred, Captain Thomas Thompson was suspended soon after reaching port. On 30 May 1778 the Marine Committee appointed John Barry to replace him as captain.

On 3 August 1778, the sailors and Marines aboard the Continental Navy ship General Gates and intercepted, then defeated, the British privateer brigantine Montague, under the command of a Captain Nelson.

The Marines aboard Providence attack a 30-ship convoy on 7 August, off the coast of Nova Scotia. They inflict damage on an armed transport carrying Highland troops.

On 27 September, the British ships HMS Experiment and HMS Unicorn engage Continental ship Raleigh off the Penobscot River, Maine, and force her aground. Some of the Marines and sailors escape to shore, but more are captured.

Marines would mainly participate in the naval battles of the war, fighting ship-to-ship, such as the Battle of Valcour Island and famed Battle of Flamborough Head. Marksmen would perch in the upper rigging and masts of the ship to fire on enemy sailors from above. However, unlike British Marines, the Continental Marines would take the then-unorthodox missions of landing parties and other services ashore. For example, Marines would support batteries ashore at the Siege of Charleston in the spring of 1780.

Continental Marines landed and briefly captured Nautilus Island and the Majabagaduce peninsula in the Penobscot Expedition in 1779, but withdrew with heavy losses when Commodore Dudley Saltonstall's force failed to capture the nearby fort. A group under Navy Captain James Willing left Pittsburgh, traveled down the Ohio and Mississippi Rivers, captured a ship later known as USS Morris, and in conjunction with other Continental Marines, brought by ship from the Gulf of Mexico, raided British Loyalists on the shore of Lake Pontchartrain on 10 September 1779. The last official act of the Continental Marines was to escort a stash of silver, on loan from Louis XVI of France, from Boston to Philadelphia to enable the opening of the Bank of North America. However, Marines did fight on the duel between USS Alliance and HMS Sibyl on 10 March 1783, the last recorded shots of the war, and Pvt Robert Stout of that ship would be the last recorded mention of a Continental Marine one year later. Major Nicholas would die from yellow fever on 27 August 1790. In all, the Continental Marines suffered 49 dead and 70 wounded.

At the end of the Revolution on 3 September 1783, both the Continental Navy and Marines were disbanded in April. Although individual Marines stayed on for the few American naval vessels left, the last Continental Marine was discharged in September. In all, there were 131 Colonial Marine officers and probably no more than 2,000 enlisted Colonial Marines. Although individual Marines were enlisted for the few American naval vessels, the organization would not be re-created until 1798. Despite the gap between the disbanding of the Continental Marines and the establishment of the United States Marine Corps, Marines worldwide celebrate 10 November 1775 as the official birthday. This is traditional in Marine units and is similar to the practice of the British and Netherlands Royal Marines. Despite the Continental Navy being older in establishment (13 October vs. 10 November 1775) and reestablishment (27 March 1794 vs. 11 July 1798), Marines have taken the position of precedence, awarded due to seniority of age, because they historically and consistently maintained their birth as 10 November, while the Navy had no official recognition of 13 October as their birthday until 1972.

== Establishment of the modern Marine Corps ==
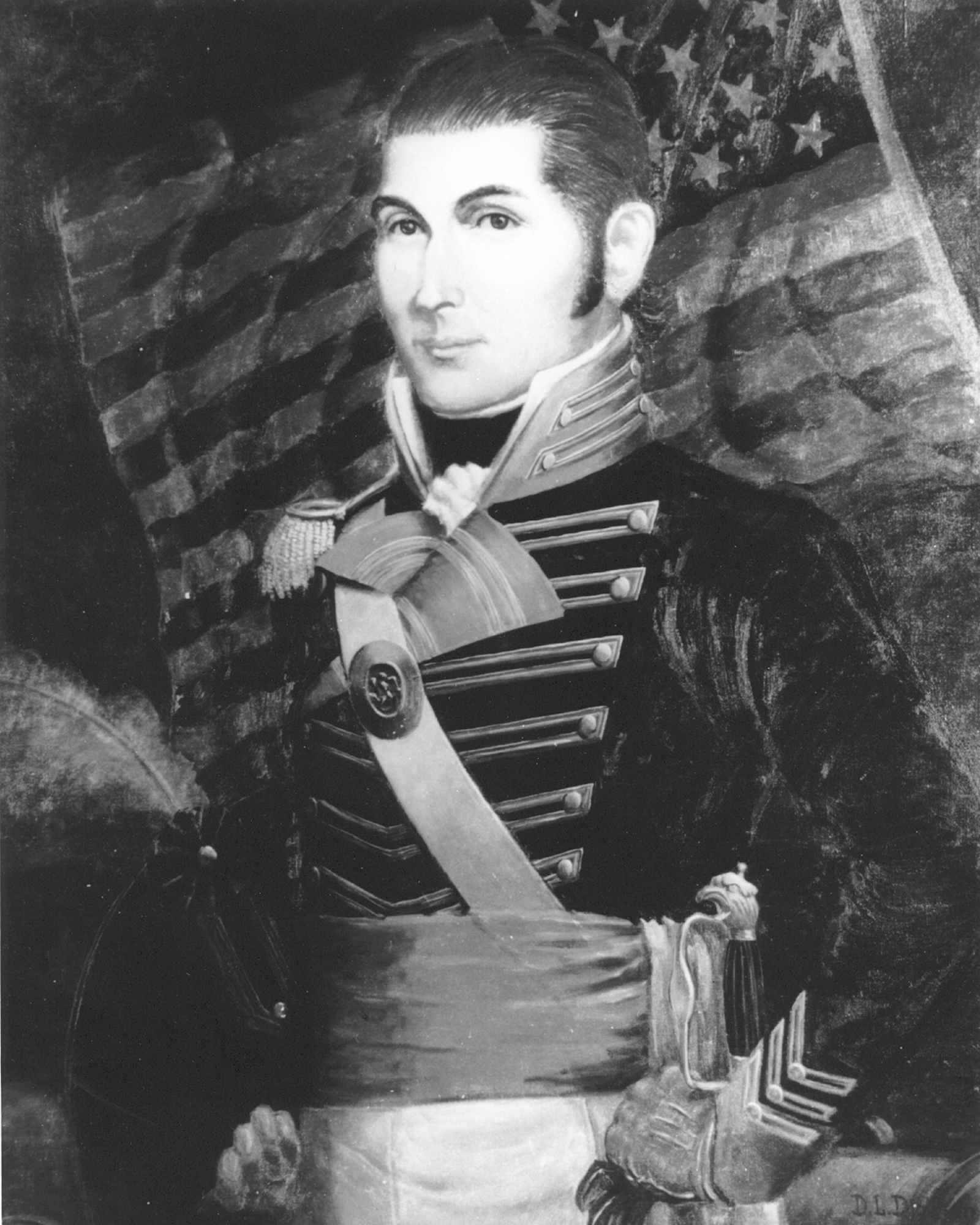
Lieutenant Presley O'Bannon earned the Mameluke sword at the Battle of Derna.

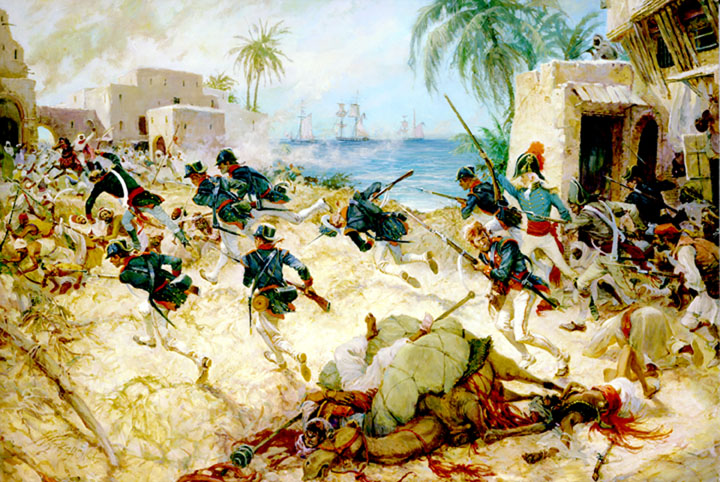
Lieutenant Presley O'Bannon at Derna, April 1805

Due to harassment by the French navy on U.S. shipping during the French Revolutionary Wars, Congress created the United States Navy and the Marine Corps. The Act to provide a Naval Armament of 27 March 1794 authorizing new build frigates for the war had specified the numbers of Marines to be recruited for each frigate. Marines were enlisted by the War Department as early as August 1797 for service in these frigates. Daniel Carmick and Lemuel Clerk were commissioned as Lieutenants of Marines on 5 May 1798. The U.S. Marine Corps was formally re-established under the "Act for establishing and organizing a Marine Corps", signed on 11 July 1798 by President John Adams. The Marine Corps was to consist of a battalion of 500 privates, led by a major and a complement of officers and NCOs. The next day, William Ward Burrows I was appointed a major. In the Quasi-War, Marines aboard USS Constitution and other ships conducted raids in the waters off Hispaniola against the French and Spanish, making the first of many landings in Haiti and participating in the Battle of Puerto Plata Harbor.

Among the equipment Burrows inherited was a stock of leftover blue uniforms with red trim, the basis for the modern Blue Dress uniform. When the capital moved to Washington, D.C., in June 1800, Burrows was appointed Lieutenant Colonel Commandant of the Marine Corps; the first de jure Commandant, though Samuel Nicholas is traditionally accorded as the first de facto Commandant for his role as the most senior officer of the Continental Marines. In 1801, President Thomas Jefferson and Burrows rode horses about the new capital to find a place suitable for a Marine barracks near the Washington Navy Yard. They chose the land between 8th and 9th, and G and I streets and hired architect George Hadfield to design the barracks and the Commandant's House, in use today as Marine Barracks, Washington, D.C.. Burrows also founded the United States Marine Band from an act of Congress passed on 11 July 1798, which debuted at the President's House on 1 January 1801 and has played for every presidential inauguration since.

The Marines' most famous action of this period occurred in the First Barbary War (1801–1805) against the Barbary pirates, when General William Eaton, the Naval Special Agent and appointed commander-in-chief of the multi-national expedition, and First Lieutenant Presley O'Bannon led a group of eight Marines and 300 Arab and European mercenaries in an attempt to capture Tripoli and free the crew of the captured USS Philadelphia. Though they only made it as far as Derne, Tripoli has been immortalized in the Marines' Hymn. The deposed Pasha, Prince Hamet Karamanli was so impressed with the Marines that he presented a Mameluke sword to O'Bannon inscribed in memory of the Battle of Derne, a tradition continued today by the swords worn by Marine officers.

In May 1811, 2 officers and 47 Marines established an advanced base on Cumberland Island, Georgia to be used for actions against pirates in Spanish Florida, and captured Fernandina on 18 March 1812 for occupation until May 1813. This was the first peacetime overseas base of the United States.

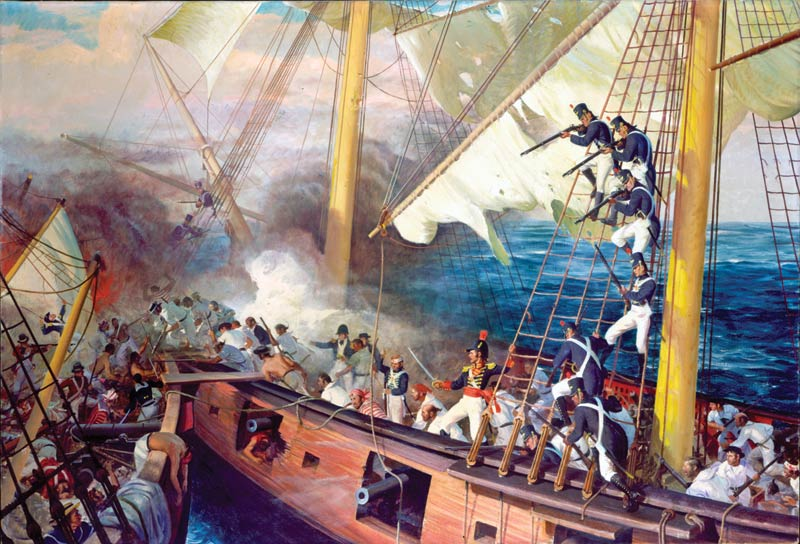
U.S. Marines in June 1814 aboard USS Wasp fire from the rigging at HMS Reindeer during the naval battle.

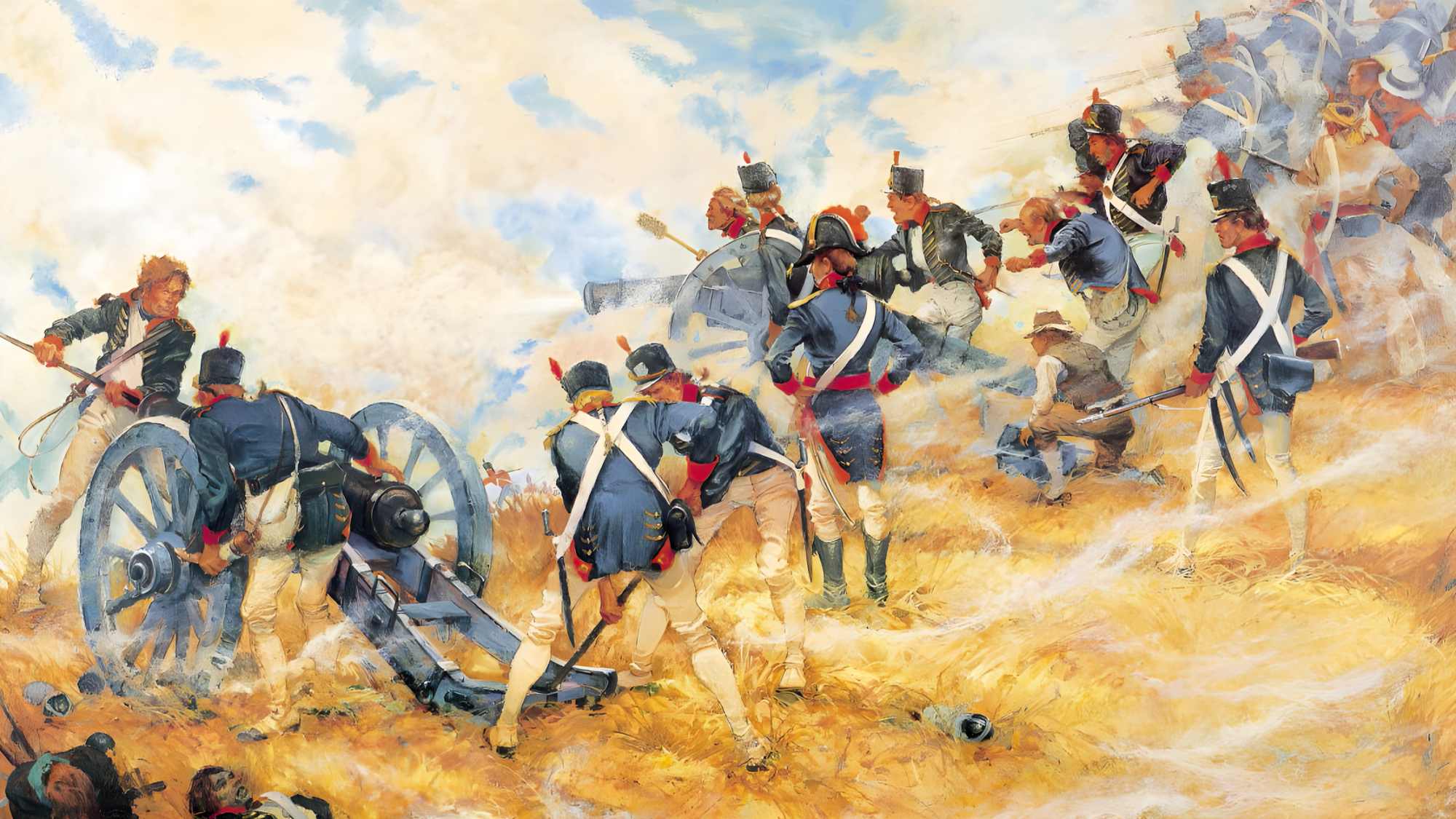
U.S. Marines manning their guns August 1814 at Bladensburg, attached to the Chesapeake Bay Flotilla under the command of U.S. Navy Commodore Joshua Barney in defense of Washington D.C.

The Marine Corps' first land action of the War of 1812 was the establishment of an advanced base at Sackets Harbor, New York by 63 Marines. This gave the Navy a base on the shores of Lake Ontario, and later, headquartered their operations in the Great Lakes; Marines helped to repel two British attacks (the First and Second Battle of Sacket's Harbor). The Marines also established another base at Erie, Pennsylvania. Marine ship detachments took part in the great frigate duels of the war, the first U.S. victories of the war. By the end of the war Marines acquired a reputation as marksmen, especially in ship-to-ship actions. On 27 April 1813, Marines participated in United States Army Colonel Winfield Scott's landing at York (now Toronto). Under Commodore Joshua Barney and Captain Samuel Miller, they acted to delay the British forces marching toward Washington at the Battle of Bladensburg. During the battle, they held the line after the Army and militia retreated, though were eventually overrun. Tradition holds that the British respected their fighting enough to spare the Marine Barracks and Commandant's house when they burned Washington, though they may have intended to use it as a headquarters; a related legend cites that two NCOs buried treasure at the site (to prevent its capture) that is yet unfound. At the Battle of New Orleans, the Marines held the center of Gen Andrew Jackson's defensive line. A total of 46 Marines would die and 66 were wounded in the war.

Together with sailors and Army troops, they again captured Amelia Island and Fernandina in Spanish Florida on 23 December 1817. Fernandina was occupied until Spain ceded Florida to the United States in 1821. In 1823, Marines also established an advanced base on Thompson's Island, now called Key West, for Commodore David Porter to use against pirates around the island of Cuba. They garrisoned Pensacola, Florida in 1825 to use it as a base against pirates in the West Indies.

=== Henderson's era ===
Have gone to Florida to fight Indians. Will be back when war is over.

— Colonel Archibald Henderson, 5th Commandant in a note pinned to his door at Marine Barracks, Washington, D.C. in 1836

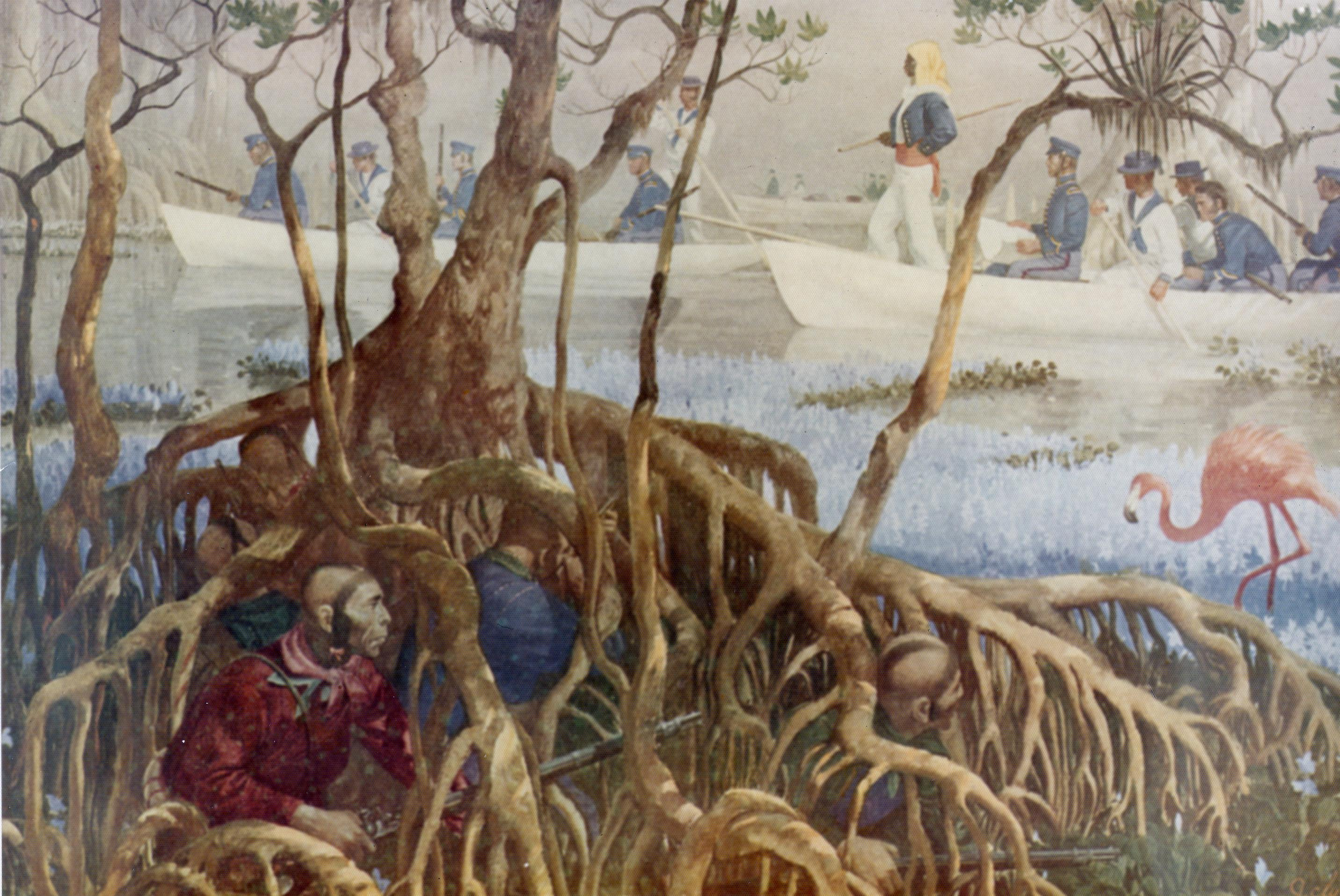
Marines hunting Seminoles in 1836 during the Battle of Wahoo Swamp in the Second Seminole War

After the war, the Marine Corps fell into a depressed state. The third Commandant, Franklin Wharton, died while in office on 1 September 1818, causing a battle for succession between Majors Anthony Gale, Samuel Miller, and Archibald Henderson (then acting Commandant). The latter two were unable to successfully impeach Gale, who assumed the role on 3 March 1819, ending a six-month vacancy. After a falling-out with Secretary Smith Thompson, Gale was court-martialed for conduct unbecoming an officer and a gentleman, convicted, and fired on 18 October 1820.

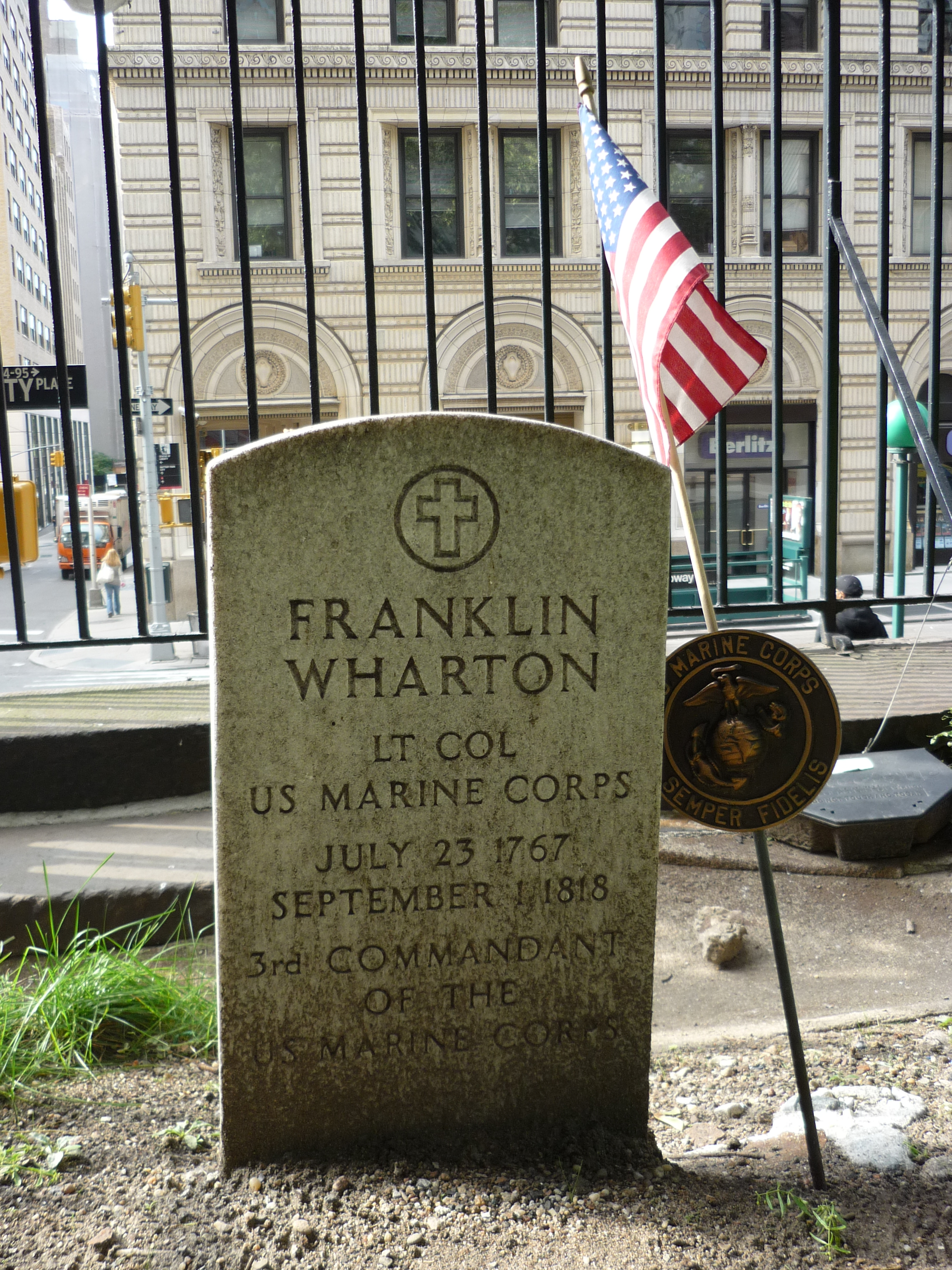
Grave of Lt. Colonel Franklin Wharton, Third Commandant of the Marine Corps, in New York City

Henderson secured a confirmed appointment as the fifth commandant in 1820 and breathed new life into the Corps. He would go on to be the longest-serving commandant, commonly referred to as the "Grand old man of the Marine Corps". Under his tenure, the Marine Corps took on a new role as an expeditionary force-in-readiness with a number of expeditionary duties in the Caribbean, the Gulf of Mexico, Key West, West Africa, the Falkland Islands, China, Fiji, Peru, Buenos Aires, Nicaragua, and Sumatra, in addition to many of the Indian Wars. Previously having rarely done anything but guard ships and naval depots, Henderson seized every opportunity to deploy his Marines in "landing party operations" and other expeditions. One example of this was the acquisition artillery pieces and training for use with landing parties, which would bear fruit at the Battle of the Pearl River Forts. Henderson is also credited with thwarting attempts by President Andrew Jackson to combine the Marine Corps with the Army. Instead, Congress passed the Act for the Better Organization of the United States Marine Corps in 1834, stipulating that the Corps was part of the Department of the Navy, as a sister service to the United States Navy. This would be the first of many times that Congress came to the aid of the Marines.

When the Seminole Wars (1835–1842) broke out, Commandant Henderson volunteered the Marines for service, leading 2 battalions to war, which accounted for about half the strength of the Marine Corps. They garrisoned Fort Brooke in Tampa and held off an Indian attack on 22 January 1836. Henderson commanded the mixed Marine/Army Second Brigade at the Battle of Hatchee-Lustee on 27 January 1837, for which he was appointed a brevet brigadier general. Marines also fought at the Battle of Wahoo Swamp that November.

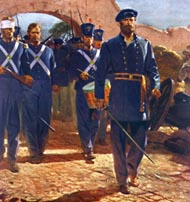
Marines enter Mexico City.

A decade later, in the Mexican–American War (1846–1848), the Marines made their famed assault on Chapultepec Palace, which overlooked Mexico City, their first major expeditionary venture. Since marching to Mexico City would be a long and perhaps impossible venture, a combined force (containing some 200 Marines) under Major General Winfield Scott made a landing south of Veracruz on 9 March 1847 and captured the city on 29 March. From there, they fought their way to Mexico City and commenced their assault on 13 September. The Marines were given the task of clearing the Chapultepec Castle, the "Halls of Montezuma," where they cut down the Mexican colors and ran up the Flag of the United States. The high mortality rate amongst officers and non-commissioned officers is memorialized in the dress uniform's "blood stripes", as well as the line "From the Halls of Montezuma" in the Marines' Hymn. Marines were later placed on guard duty at the palace and Captain Jacob Zeilin, a future Commandant, was made military governor. Marines also served as part of the Navy's blockade of Mexico that successfully prevented overseas arms and munitions from reaching the Mexican forces, and as part of the California Battalion under Major Archibald H. Gillespie; engagements included the battles of Monterey, Los Angeles, Dominguez Rancho, San Pasqual, Rio San Gabriel, La Mesa, and 2nd Tabasco. Other battles included the 1st, 2nd, & 3rd Tuxpan, capturing La Paz, defending La Paz, Mulege, and capturing and defending San José del Cabo.

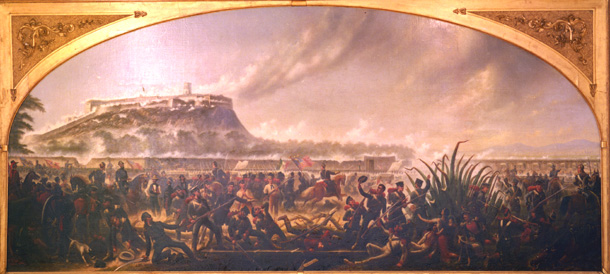
Storming of Chapultapec by James Walker in 1858

In the 1850s, the Marines would further see service in Panama, and in Asia, escorting Matthew Perry's fleet on its historic trip to the East. Two hundred Marines under Zeilin were among the Americans who first set foot on Japan; they can be seen in contemporary woodprints in their blue jackets, white trousers, and black shakos. Marines were also performed landing demonstrations while the expedition visited the Ryukyu and Bonin Islands. Upon Henderson's death in 1859, legend cites that he willed the Commandant's House, his home of 38 years, to his heirs, forgetting that it was government property; however, this has proven false.

== Civil War ==
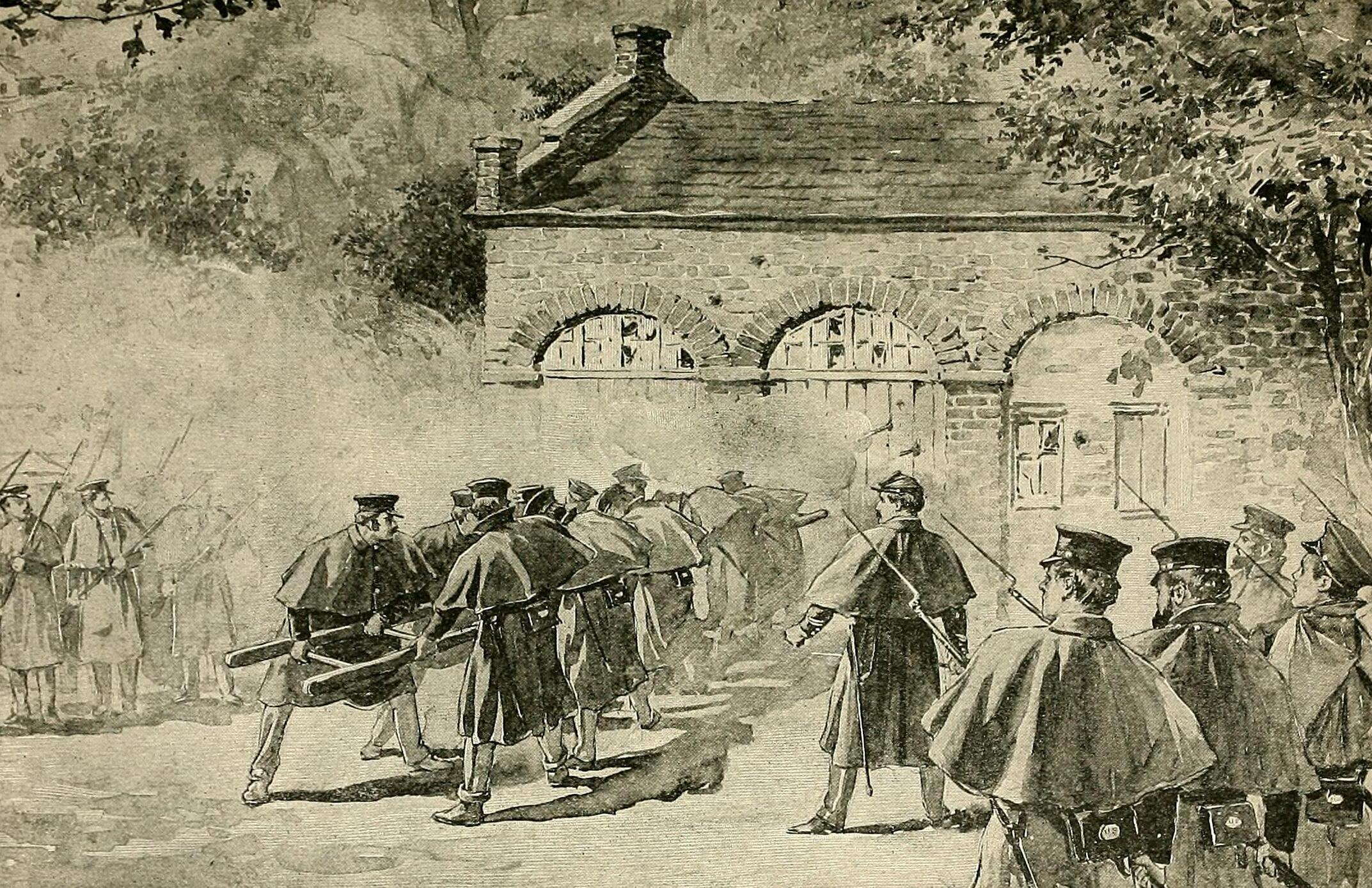
Marines surround John Brown's Fort in 1859.

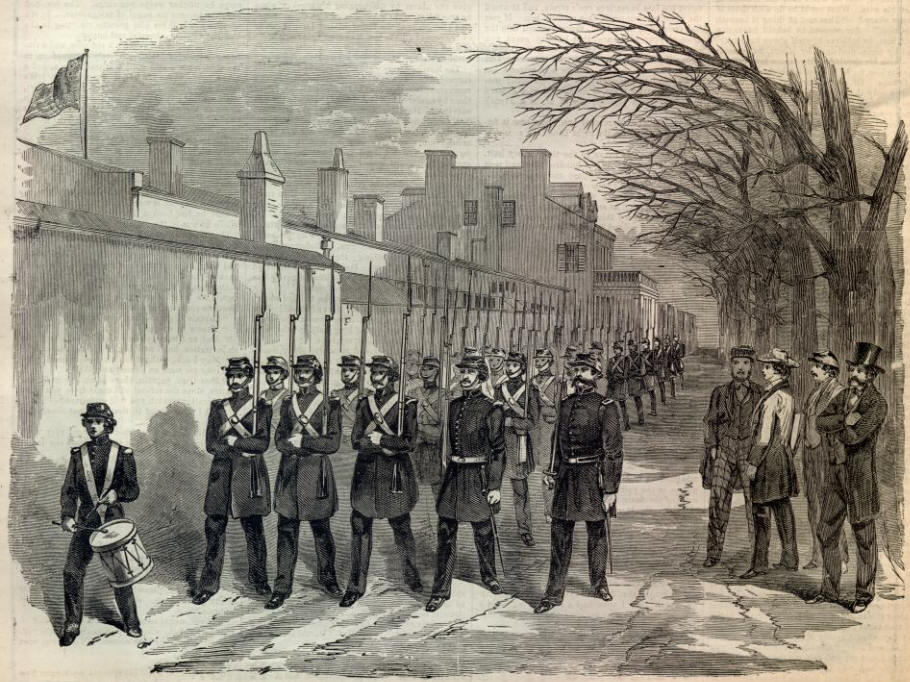
1861 illustration of U.S. Marines at the Marine barracks in Washington, D.C.

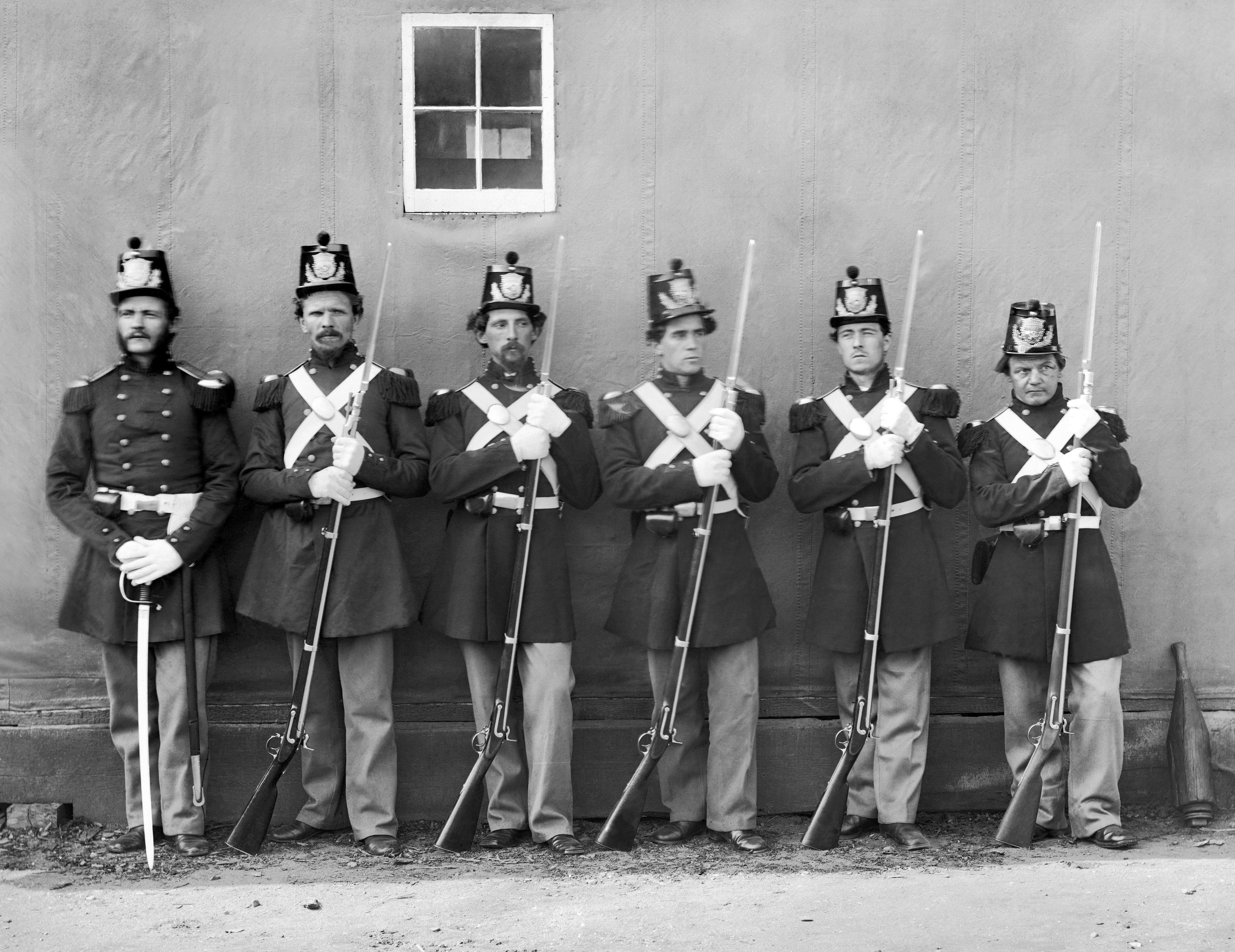
Five Marine privates with fixed bayonets, and their NCO with his sword at the Washington Navy Yard, 1864

Despite their stellar service in foreign engagements, the Marine Corps played only a minor role during the Civil War (1861–1865); their most important task was blockade duty and other ship-board battles, but were mobilized for a handful of operations as the war progressed.

During the prelude to war, a hastily created 86-man Marine detachment under Lieutenant Israel Greene was detached to arrest John Brown at Harper's Ferry in 1859, after the abolitionist raided the armory there. Command of the mission was given to then-Colonel Robert E. Lee and his aide, Lieutenant J.E.B. Stuart, both having been on leave in Washington when President James Buchanan ordered Brown arrested. The ninety Marines arrived to the town on 17 October via train, and quickly surrounded John Brown's Fort. Upon his refusal to surrender, the Marines stormed the building with bayonets, battering down the door with hammers and a ladder used as a battering ram. Greene slashed Brown twice and would have killed him had his sword not bent on his last thrust; in his haste he had carried his light dress sword instead of his regulation sword.

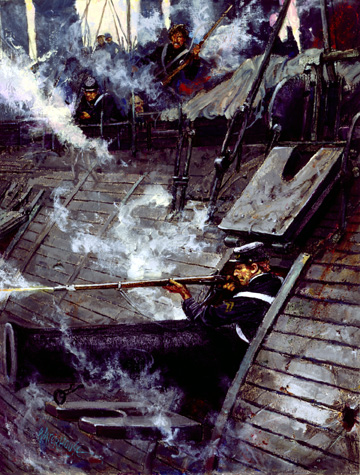
Cpl John F. Mackie became the first Marine Medal of Honor recipient at the Battle of Drewry's Bluff in 1862.

At the opening of the war, the Marine Corps had 1892 officers and men, but two majors, half the captains, and two-thirds of the lieutenants resigned to join the Confederacy, as did many prominent Army officers. Though the retention of enlisted men was better, the Confederate States Marine Corps formed its nucleus with some of the best Marines the Corps had. Following the wave of defections, thirteen officers and 336 Marines, mostly recruits, were hastily formed into a battalion and sent to Manassas. At the First Battle of Bull Run (First Manassas), U.S. Marines performed poorly, running away like the rest of the Union forces. Commandant John Harris reported sadly that this was "the first instance in Marine history where any portion of its members turned their backs to the enemy". However, "The Marines performed as well as, if not better than, any other Federal organization on the battlefield of 21 July 1861. No regiment in McDowell's army went into the fight more often or with greater spirit than the Marine battalion."

Congress only slightly enlarged the Marines due to the priority of the Army; and after filling detachments for the ships of the Navy (which had more than doubled in size by 1862), the Marine Corps was only able to field about one battalion at any given time as a larger force for service ashore. Marines from ship's detachments as well as ad-hoc battalions took part in the landing operations necessary to capture bases for blockade duty. These were mostly successful, but on 8 September 1863, the Marines tried an amphibious landing to capture Fort Sumter in Charlestown harbor and failed, one of the few failed landings of the Marine Corps. Due to a shortage of officers, the Marines of Commander George Preble's naval brigade that fought at the Battle of Honey Hill in 1864 started the battle with First Lieutenant George Stoddard as the battalion commander (normally accorded a lieutenant colonel), the only officer in the battalion (the company commanders and other staff being sergeants).

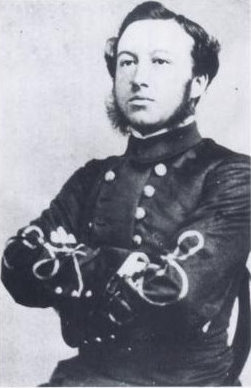
Confederate Marine Lt Frances H. Cameron in 1864

On 15 May 1862, the Battle of Drewry's Bluff began as a detachment of ships under Commander John Rodgers (including the USS Monitor and USS Galena) steamed up the James River to test the defenses of Richmond as part of the Peninsula Campaign. As the Galena took heavy losses, the unwavering musket and cannon fire of Corporal John F. Mackie would earn him the Medal of Honor on 10 July 1863, the first Marine to be so awarded.

In January 1865, the Marines took part in the Second Battle of Fort Fisher, tasked with acting as marksmen on the flank of the attack to shoot any Confederate troops that appeared on the ramparts of the fort. Even though they were ordered from their firing positions by Admiral Porter's second in command, Porter blamed the Marines for the failure of the naval landing force to take the fort. Despite this, the fort was successfully captured; five Marines earned the Medal of Honor during the battle. In all, Marines received 17 of the 1,522 awards during the Civil War. A total of 148 Marines would die in the war, the most casualties up to that point.

=== Confederate Marines ===
The Confederate Congress authorized the creation of the Confederate States Marine Corps on 16 March 1861. It was a branch of the Confederate Navy. It was established by an act of the Provisional Congress of the Confederate States on March 16, 1861. The Corps' manpower was initially authorized at 45 officers and 944 enlisted men, and was increased on September 24, 1862, to 1,026 enlisted men. The headquarters and main training facilities remained in Richmond, Virginia, throughout the war, located at Camp Beall on Drewry's Bluff and at the Gosport Shipyard in Portsmouth, Virginia. The last Confederate Marine unit surrendered to the Union army on April 9, 1865, with the Confederacy itself capitulating a month later.

== Latter 19th century ==
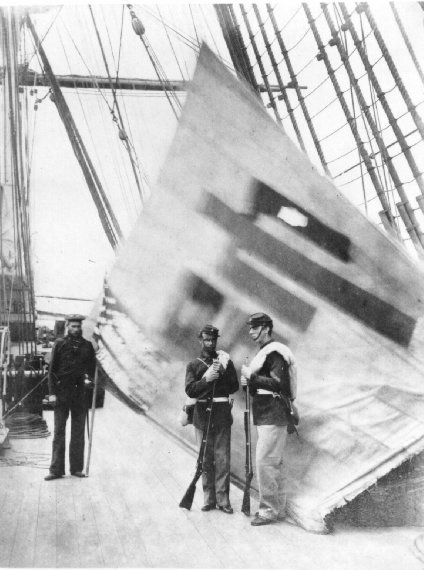
Three Medal of Honor recipients aboard USS Colorado with a captured sujagi after the Korean Expedition in 1871

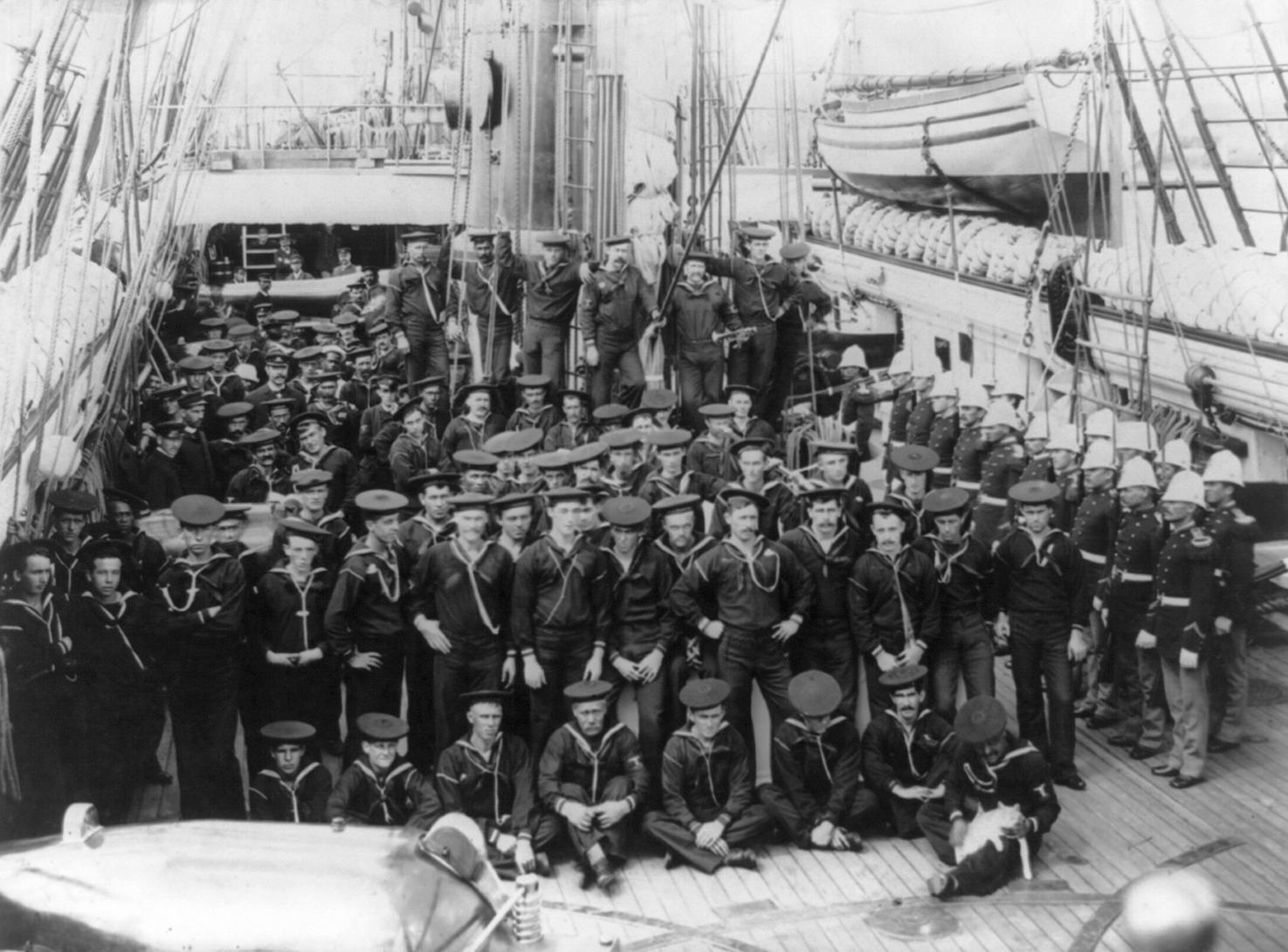
A post Civil War photograph of the USS Kearsarge (1861); the uniforms of the Marine Ships guard at the right point to the period 1892–1904.

The remainder of the 19th century would be a period of declining strength and introspection about the mission of the Marine Corps. The Navy's transition from sail to steam put into question the need for Marines on naval ships; indeed, the replacement of masts and rigging with smokestacks literally left Marine marksmen without a place. However, the Marines would serve as a convenient resource for interventions and landings to protect U.S. lives and property in foreign countries, such as the expedition to Formosa in 1867. In June 1871, 651 Marine deployed for the expedition to Korea and made a landing at Ganghwa Island in which six Marines earned the Medal of Honor and one was killed (landings were also taken by the French in 1866 and Japanese in 1875), 79 years before the famed landing at nearby Inchon. After the Virginius Affair caused a war scare with Spain, Marines took part in naval brigade landing exercises in Key West in 1874, Gardiners Island in August 1884, and Newport, Rhode Island in November 1887. Three Marines earned Medals of Honor in the Samoan Civil War. Altogether, the Marines were involved in over 28 separate interventions in the 35 years from the end of the Civil War to the end of the 19th century, including China, Formosa, Japan, Nicaragua, Uruguay, Mexico, Korea, Panama, Egypt, Haiti, Samoa, Argentina, Chile, and Colombia, including the overthrow of the Kingdom of Hawaii, which would be annexed five years later. They would also be called upon to stem political and labor unrest within the United States, such as guarding mail. In 1885, war correspondent Richard Harding Davis popularized the phrase "The Marines have landed and have the situation well in hand" when describing Americans intervention in a Panamanian revolt.

Under Commandant Jacob Zeilin's term (1864–1876), many Marine customs and traditions took shape. The Corps adopted the Marine Corps emblem in essentially its modern form on 19 November 1868, borrowing the globe from the Royal Marines, but introducing the fouled anchor and a U.S. bald eagle. In 1869, the Corps adopted a blue-black evening jacket and trousers encrusted with gold braid, that survives today as officer's mess dress. It was also during this time that the "Marines' Hymn" was first heard. Around 1883, the Marines adopted their current motto "Semper Fidelis", Latin for "Always Faithful" and often shortened by Marines to "Semper Fi". In 1885 1st Lt. H.K. Gilman wrote the first manual for enlisted Marines, Marines' Manual: Prepared for the Use of the Enlisted Men of the U.S. Marine Corps and in 1886 the first landing manual The Naval Brigade and Operations Ashore. Previous to this, the only landing instructions available were those in the Ordnance Instructions for the United States Navy. John Philip Sousa, previously an apprentice in the Marine Band as a child, returned to lead the band in 1880 at the age of 25, making a name for himself and the Band with his composed marches.

=== Spanish– & Philippine–American Wars ===
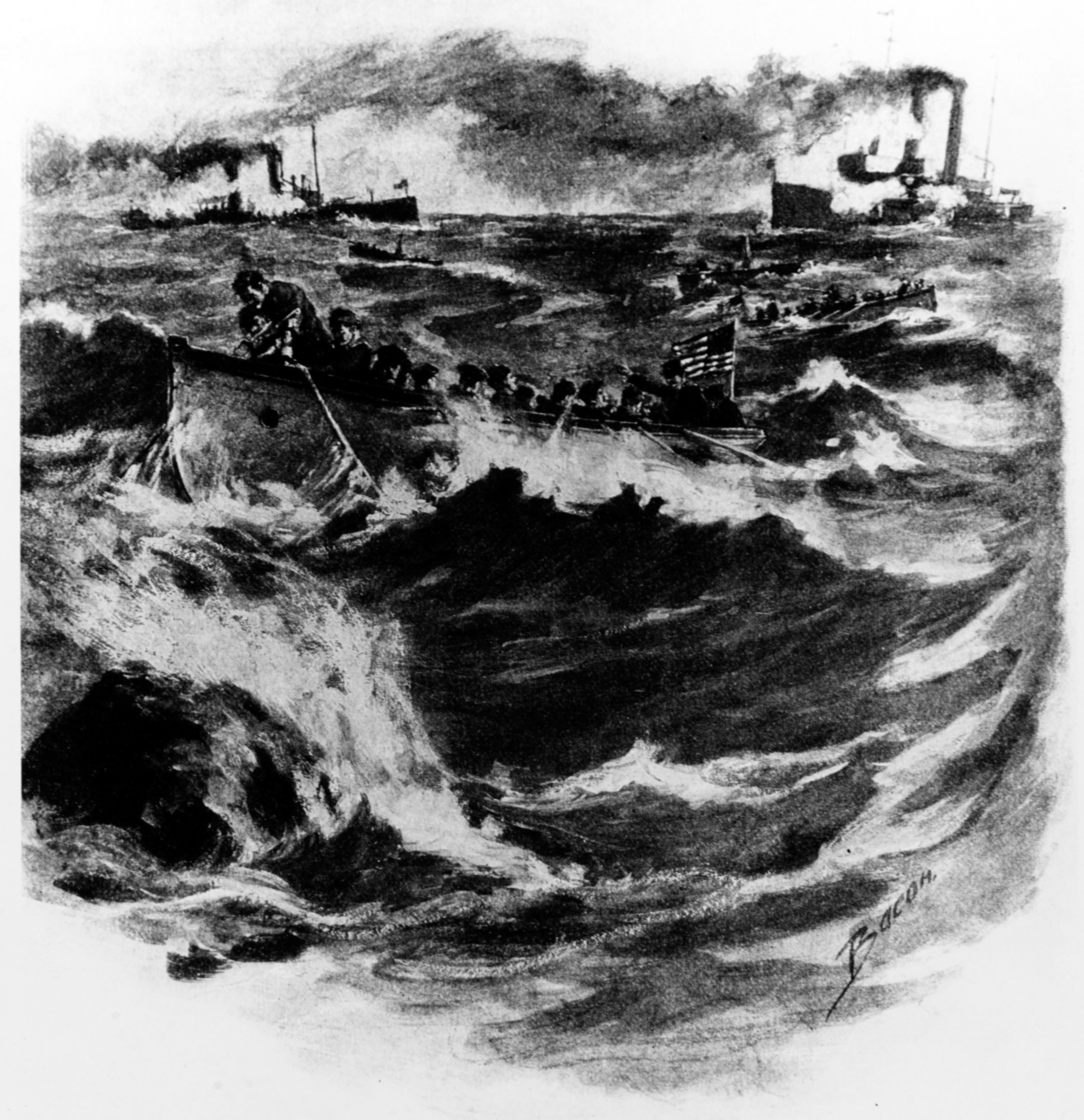
Marines at the Battle of Cienfuegos

During the Spanish–American War (1898), Marines would lead U.S. forces ashore in the Philippines, Cuba, and Puerto Rico, demonstrating their readiness for deployment. At the Battle of Cienfuegos, Marines from the USS Marblehead and USS Nashville cut undersea telegraph cables under heavy Spanish fire to support the blockade of Cuba, 12 of them earning the Medal of Honor for their actions. The 1st Battalion, under LtCol Robert W. Huntington, invaded and captured Guantánamo Bay in order to set up an advanced base and refueling station for the fleet. In the seizure of Cuzco Well, a Spanish counterattack was aided by fire from the USS Dolphin, and Sergeant John H. Quick would later receive the Medal of Honor for braving both Spanish rifle fire and naval gunfire to signal the Dolphin and shift fire.

At the outbreak of war, owing to a shortage of khaki cloth, Marine forces wore their standard blue wool uniforms. Later, a brown linen "campaign suit" was adopted, to be worn in conjunction with the felt campaign hat. Equipment consisted of a wide belt with attached x-suspenders and ammunition pouches, all made of black leather; a canteen, haversack, plus bayonet scabbard.

In the Puerto Rican campaign, Marine detachments under Lieutenant John A. Lejeune landed in Fajardo in order to seize boats for a subsequent landing by Army forces. While they were waiting for the Army, they were attacked by strong Spanish forces in a night attack. Upon a prearranged signal, the Marines and sailors occupying the Cape San Juan Lighthouse took cover while the U.S. ships bombarded the area. They left the next day when they found out that the Army commander had changed his mind and landed on the other end of the island at Guánica, securing the beach for the Army.

In the Philippines, Marines landed at Cavite following the Battle of Manila Bay under Commodore George Dewey, and saw action at the Capture of Guam and Siege of Baler. In the subsequent Philippine–American War, Marines played little role in fighting but did serve as occupiers and peacekeepers. In all, fifteen Marines would earn the Medal of Honor, most of them at Cienfuegos; and additional six in the Philippines.

== Early 1900s ==
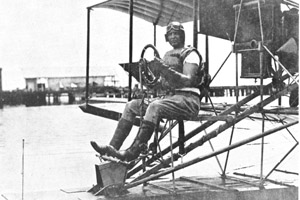
Lieutenant Alfred Cunningham, the first Marine aviator

The successful landing at Guantanamo and the readiness of the Marines for the Spanish–American War were in contrast to the slow mobilization of the United States Army in the war. In 1900, the General Board of the United States Navy decided to give the Marine Corps primary responsibility for the seizure and defense of advanced naval bases. The Marine Corps formed an expeditionary battalion to be permanently based in the Caribbean, which subsequently practiced landings in 1902 in preparation for a war with Germany over their siege in Venezuela. Under Major Lejeune, in early 1903, it also undertook landing exercises with the Army in Maine, and in November, blocked Colombian Army forces sent to quash a Panamanian rebellion, an action which led to the independence of Panama. Marines stayed in Panama, with brief intermissions as they were deployed for other actions, until 1914. From 1903 to 1904, 25 Marines protected American diplomats in Abyssinia, modern day Ethiopia. A small group of Marines made a show of force in Tangier to resolve the kidnapping of Ion Perdicaris in the summer of 1904. The Marine Corps Advanced Base School was founded as was the Advanced Base Force, the prototype of the Fleet Marine Force.

Marine aviation began on 22 May 1912, when Lieutenant Alfred Austell Cunningham reported to the Naval Aviation Camp in Annapolis, Maryland, "for duty in connection with aviation." As the number of Marine Aviators grew over the next few years, so did the desire to separate from Naval Aviation, realized on 6 January 1914, when Lt Bernard L. Smith was directed to Culebra, Puerto Rico, to establish the Marine Section of the Navy Flying School. In 1915, the Commandant George Barnett authorized the creation of an aviation company consisting of 10 officers and 40 enlisted men. The first official Marine flying unit arrived with the 17 February 1917, commissioning of the Marine Aviation Company for duty with the Advanced Base Force at the Philadelphia Navy Yard.

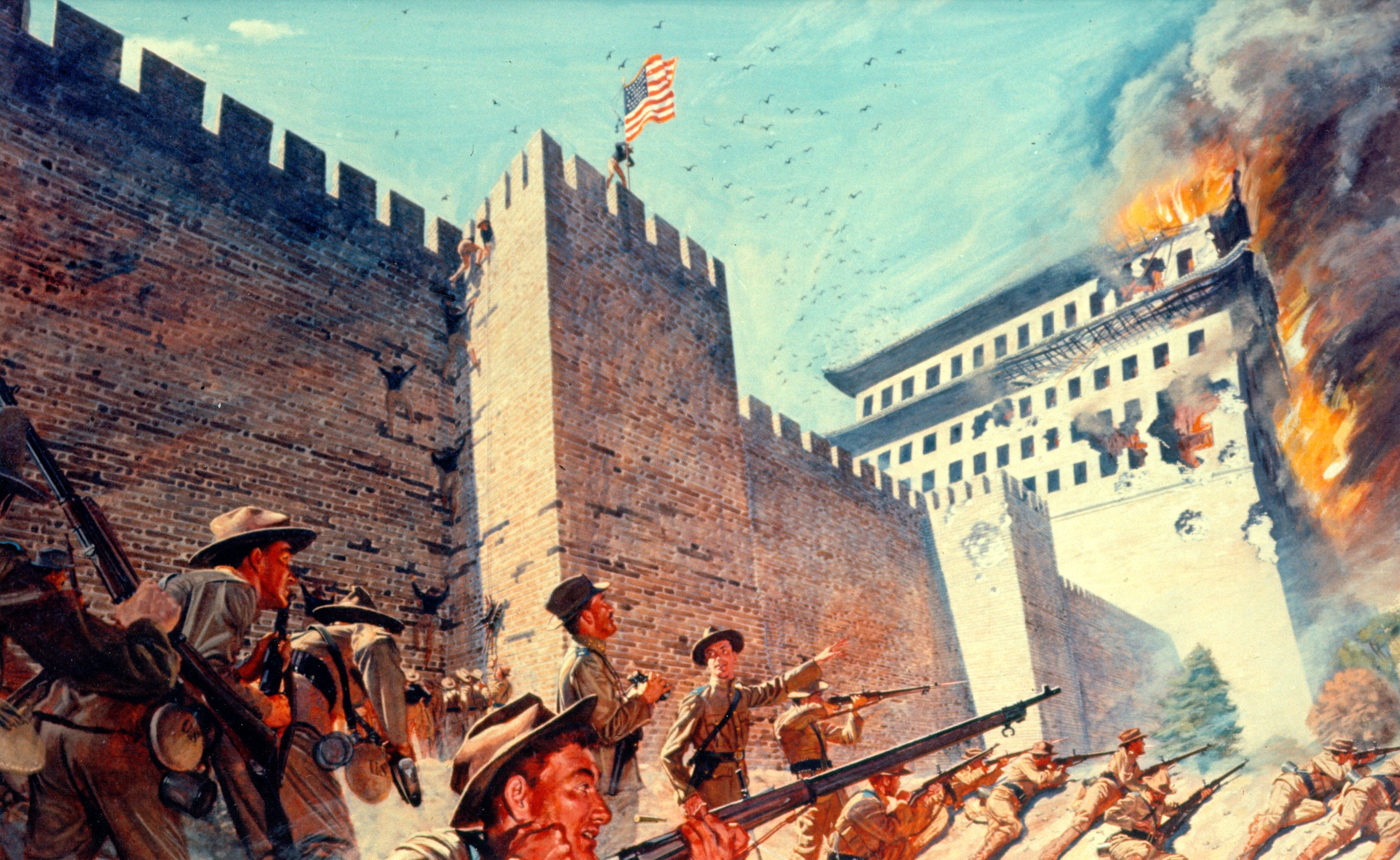
U.S. Army's 14th Infantry Regiment at the Battle of Peking

Marines played a role in China, which would continue on through to the 1950s. Originally dispatched in 1894 to protect Americans during the First Sino-Japanese War, Marines defended western legations in the Battles of Tientsin and Peking during the Boxer Rebellion (1899–1901) and China Relief Expedition. The Boxers, seeking to drive all foreigners from China and eradicate foreign influences, became violent and began murdering westerners. The remaining foreigners banded together in the Beijing Legation Quarter and were protected by a small military force, which included 56 Marines, until reinforcements from the Eight-Nation Alliance, including the Army's 9th Infantry Regiment and a battalion of Marines stationed in the Philippines, arrived on 14 August 1900 to end the rebellion. Private Daniel Daly would earn his first Medal of Honor here, as well as 32 other Marines. Marines would redeploy from April 1922 to November 1923, and again in 1924, to protect Americans during the First and Second Zhili–Fengtian Wars. The 4th Marine Regiment would arrive in 1927, to defend the Shanghai International Settlement during the Northern Expedition and Second Sino-Japanese War, later being called China Marines. The regiment would leave in 1941 for Cavite to fight in World War II.

=== Banana Wars ===
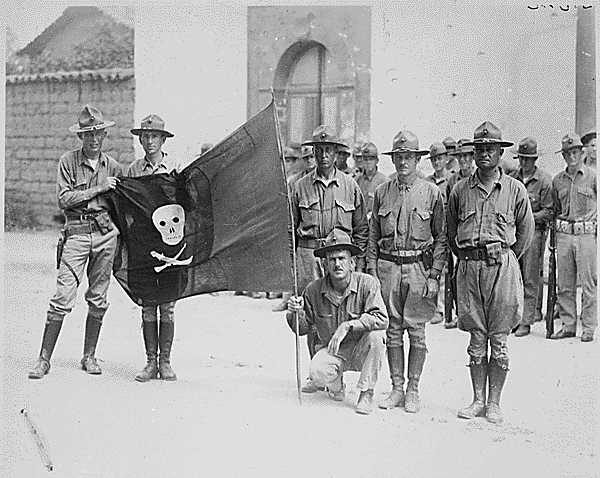
Marines in Nicaragua display a flag captured from Sandino in 1932.

Between 1900 and 1916, the Marine Corps continued its record of participation in foreign expeditions, especially in the Caribbean and Central and South America, which included Panama, Cuba, Veracruz, Haiti, Santo Domingo, and Nicaragua. These actions became known as the "Banana Wars", and the experiences gained in counter-insurgency and guerrilla operations during this period were consolidated into the Small Wars Manual in 1935. Action in these places south of the United States continued through World War I, and after for many years. Many of these actions were part of the Monroe Doctrine; that is, the efforts of the United States to prevent further colonization and interference in the Western Hemisphere. Marines occasionally had to fight against their reputation as the private army of the State Department. A total of 93 Marines would die throughout the various conflicts.

In December 1909, Major Smedley Butler commanded 3rd Battalion 1st Marines in Panama. The battalion, which had occupied Panama since that nation's independence from Colombia in 1903, would remain until 1914, with intermissions where it was sent to Nicaragua, Veracruz, and Haiti.

The United States occupied Cuba since the Spanish left on 1 January 1899, but could not annex it as a territory (unlike the Philippines and Guam) per the Teller Amendment. After establishing Guantanamo Bay Naval Base, the Marines assisted in the occupation from 1899 to 1902 under military governor Leonard Wood, and again from 1906 to 1909, 1912, and from 1917 to 1922.

On 27 May 1910, Major Butler arrived in Bluefields with 250 men to protect American interests in Juan José Estrada's rebellion. Marines returned to occupy Nicaragua from 1912 to 1933 in order to prevent the construction of the Nicaragua Canal without American control. Butler returned in the summer of 1912 with 350 Marines on the USS Annapolis to supplement the 100 Marines sent there the previous month, again augmented by another 750 Marines under Colonel Joseph Henry Pendleton. Resistance from Luis Mena and Benjamín Zeledón was crushed that October, and the majority of the Marines left, having lost 37 of their number. The remainder occupied the nation, mostly fighting Augusto César Sandino and his group until the Good Neighbor policy and the Great Depression prompted their withdrawal in January 1933. A total of 130 Marines were killed in the 21 years in Nicaragua, while two earned the Medal of Honor there.

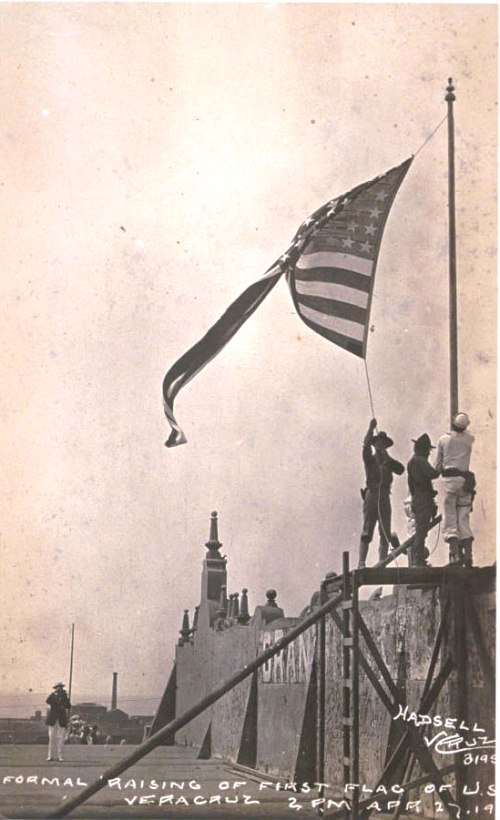
Sergeant Major John H. Quick raises a U.S. flag over Veracruz in 1914.

Marines also returned to Mexico during the Mexican Revolution. From 5 to 7 September 1903, Marines protected Americans evacuating the Yaqui River Valley. In response to the Tampico Affair and to intercept weapons being shipped to Victoriano Huerta in spite of an arms embargo, Marines were deployed to Veracruz on 21 April 1914 to occupy it. Landing unopposed from USS Florida and USS Utah, Marines under Colonel Wendell Cushing Neville fought their way to their objectives on the waterfront. Around midnight, additional ships arrived, bring with them Maj Butler and his battalion from Panama, and in the morning, captured the Veracruz Naval Academy. Another regiment under Colonel Lejeune arrived that afternoon, and by the 24th, the entire city was secure. On 1 May, Colonel Littleton Waller arrived with a third regiment and took command of the brigade. Marines were gradually replaced with soldiers and returned to their ships until the American withdrawal on 23 November. Fifty-six Medals of Honor were awarded, including Butler's first. The Army would return to Mexico in two years for the Pancho Villa Expedition.

Marines saw action in the Dominican Republic in 1903, 1904, and 1914, then occupied it from 1916 until 1924. After Desiderio Arias seized power from Juan Isidro Jimenes Pereyra, Rear Admirals William B. Caperton and Harry Shepard Knapp landed Marines in May 1916 to restore order. Locals began a resistance that lasted until 1921, and the Marines were withdrawn the following year, with a total of three having earned the Medal of Honor. Marines would return in 1965.

The Marines also occupied Haiti from 28 July 1915 until 1 August 1934. When Cacos overthrew the government and the possibility of an anti-American Rosalvo Bobo became the likely president of Haiti, President Woodrow Wilson sent the Marines in to secure American business dominance, but publicly announced to "re-establish peace and order". On 17 November 1915, Major Butler led a force of Marines to capture Fort Riviere, a Caco stronghold. After organized armed resistance was over, the governance from the United States began to improve infrastructure and living conditions, but denied the Haitians any real self-governeance. In 1930, after the Forbes Commission criticized this, and President Herbert Hoover began a withdrawal in 1932. The last Marines departed on 15 August 1934. In the nineteen-year occupation, eight Marines would earn the Medal of Honor, including the second awards to Gunnery Sergeant Dan Daly and Major Butler, the only Marines to be twice awarded. The latter would later express his disapproval of the occupation and gunboat diplomacy in his book War Is a Racket. The Marines would return to Haiti in 1994 and 2010.

Marine Aviators began to experiment with air-ground tactics during the Banana Wars and making the support of their fellow Marines on the ground their primary mission. It was in Haiti that Marines began to develop the tactic of dive bombing and in Nicaragua where they began to perfect it. While other nations and services had tried variations of this technique, Marine aviators were the first to embrace it and make it part of their tactical doctrine. Cunningham had noted in 1920 that "...the only excuse for aviation in any service is its usefulness in assisting the troops on the ground to successfully carry out their missions." On 3 May 1925 the Marine Corps officially appeared in the Navy's Aeronautical Organization the Navy's Bureau of Aeronautics authorized three fighter squadrons. Also in the 1920s, Marine squadrons began qualifying on board aircraft carriers.

== World War I ==
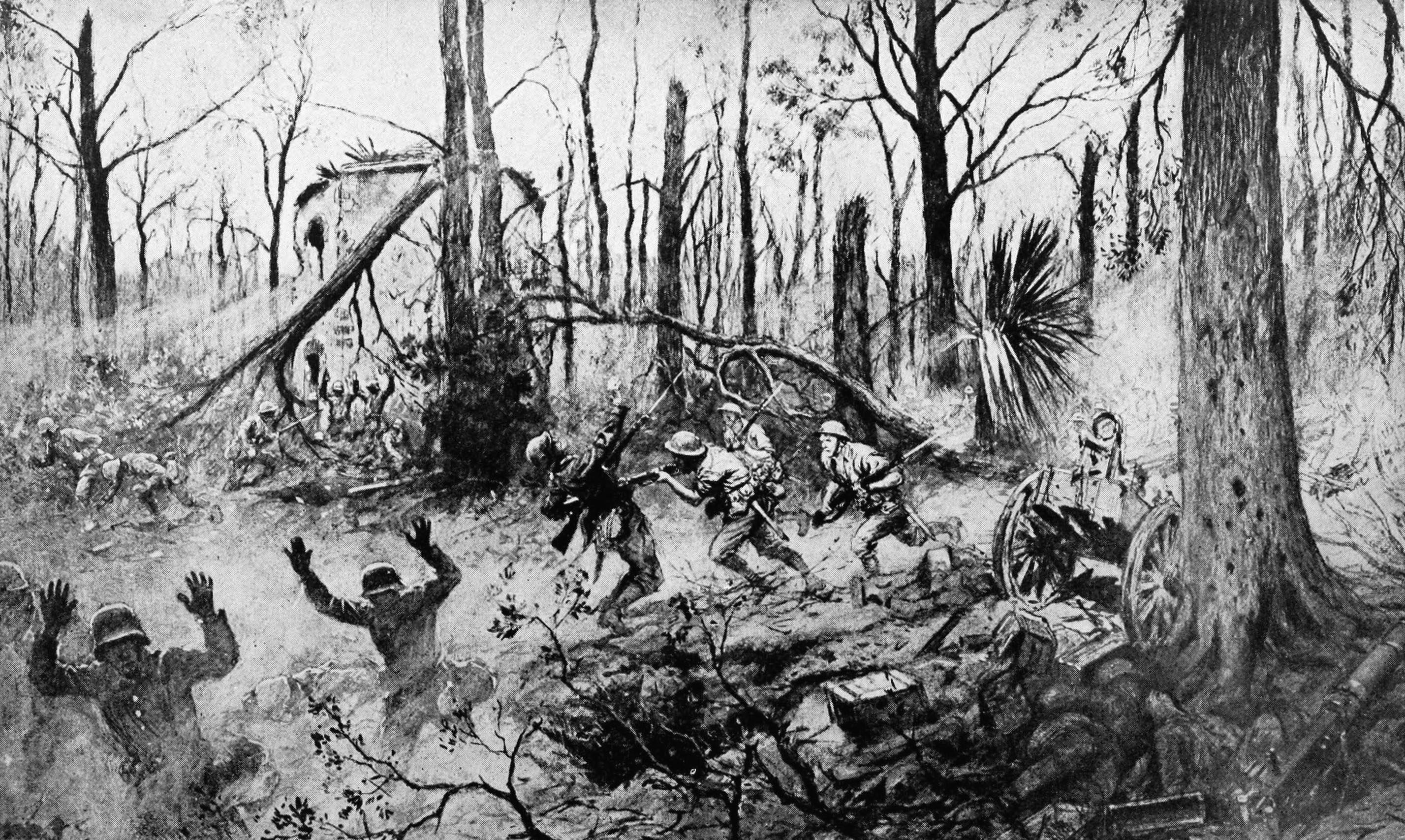
French artist Georges Scott makes the Marines heroes in his La Brigade Marine Americane Au Bois De Belleau.

In 1917–1918, the Marine Corps had a deep pool of officers and non-commissioned officers with battle experience against weak opponents. They were not trained for the intense and highly technical conflict underway in Europe on the Western Front in France. They participated in small ways throughout 1918 (such as Château-Thierry, Soissons, and Saint-Mihiel), but its most famous action of the war would come that summer as the German spring offensive neared its end. From 1 to 26 June, Marines fought the Battle of Belleau Wood, then the largest in the history of the Corps (but very minor given the overall size of the battle). It served to enhance their public reputation. Rallying under the battle cries of "Retreat? Hell, we just got here!" (Capt Lloyd Williams) and "Come on, you sons of bitches, do you want to live forever?" (GySgt Dan Daly), the Marines drove German forces from the area but suffered many losses mostly explained by the lack of experience of its officers and the use of outdated tactics. While its previous expeditionary experience had not earned it much acclaim in the Western world, the Marines' fierceness and toughness earned them the respect of the Germans, and gave rise to the myth that the Marines had been nicknamed "Teufelhunden" ("Devil Dogs") by the Germans. However, this nickname—first used by the Marines themselves, according to the United States Marine Corps History Division—predated Belleau Wood in print by six weeks, and was likely an invention of an American war correspondent. Nevertheless, the nickname was quickly used on a Marine Corps recruiting poster, and has endured as a part of Marine Corps lore.

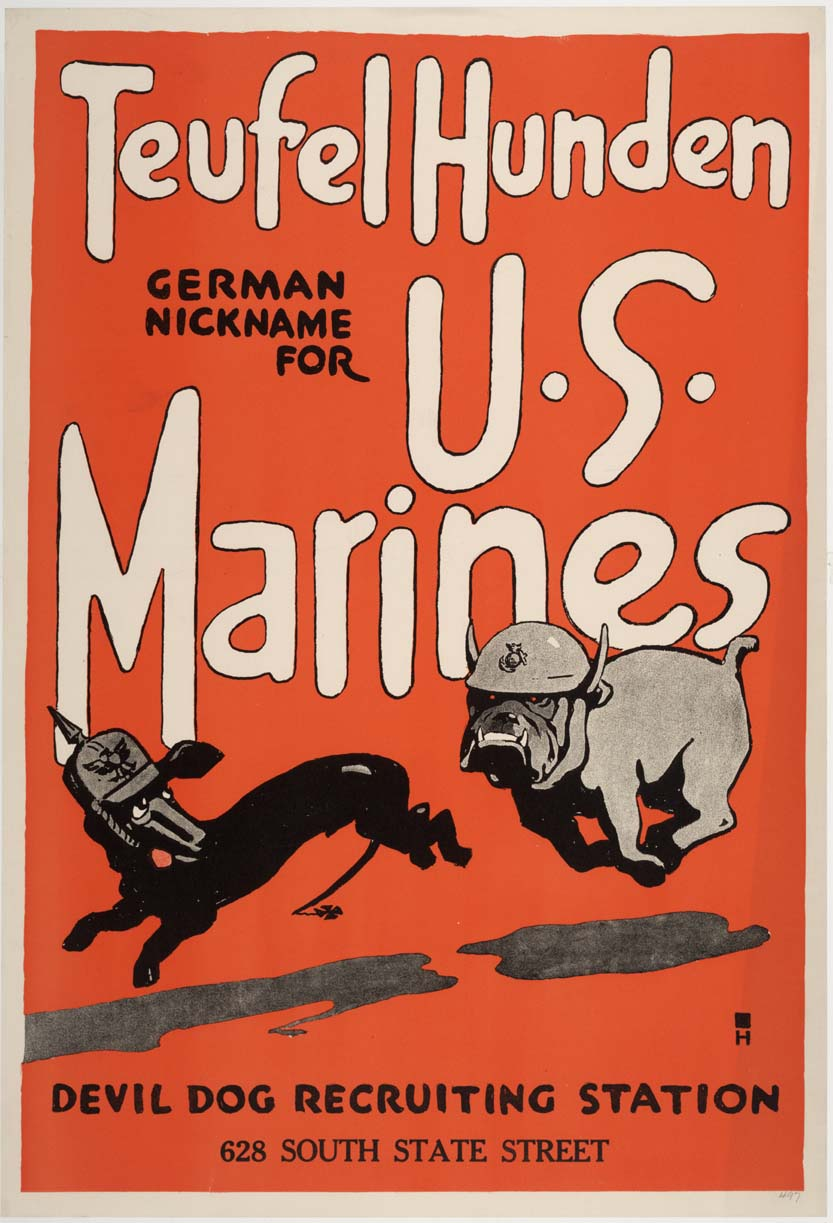
The "Devil Dog" recruiting poster

The French government renamed the forest to "Bois de la Brigade de Marine" ("Wood of the Marine Brigade"), and decorated both the 5th and 6th Regiments with the Croix de Guerre three times each. This earned them the privilege to wear the fourragère, which Franklin D. Roosevelt, then Secretary of the Navy, authorized them to henceforth wear on the left shoulder of their dress and service uniforms. Marine aviation also saw exponential growth, as the First Aeronautic Company which deployed to the Azores to hunt U-boats in January 1918 and the First Marine Air Squadron which deployed to France as the newly renamed 1st Marine Aviation Force in July 1918 and provided bomber and fighter support to the Navy's Day Wing, Northern Bombing Group. By the end of the war, several Marine aviators had recorded air-to-air kills, and collectively dropped over 14 short tons (13,000 kg) of bombs. and their number totals included 282 officers and 2,180 enlisted men operating from 8 squadrons. In 1919 the 1st Division/Squadron 1 was formed from these units, and exists as VMA-231.

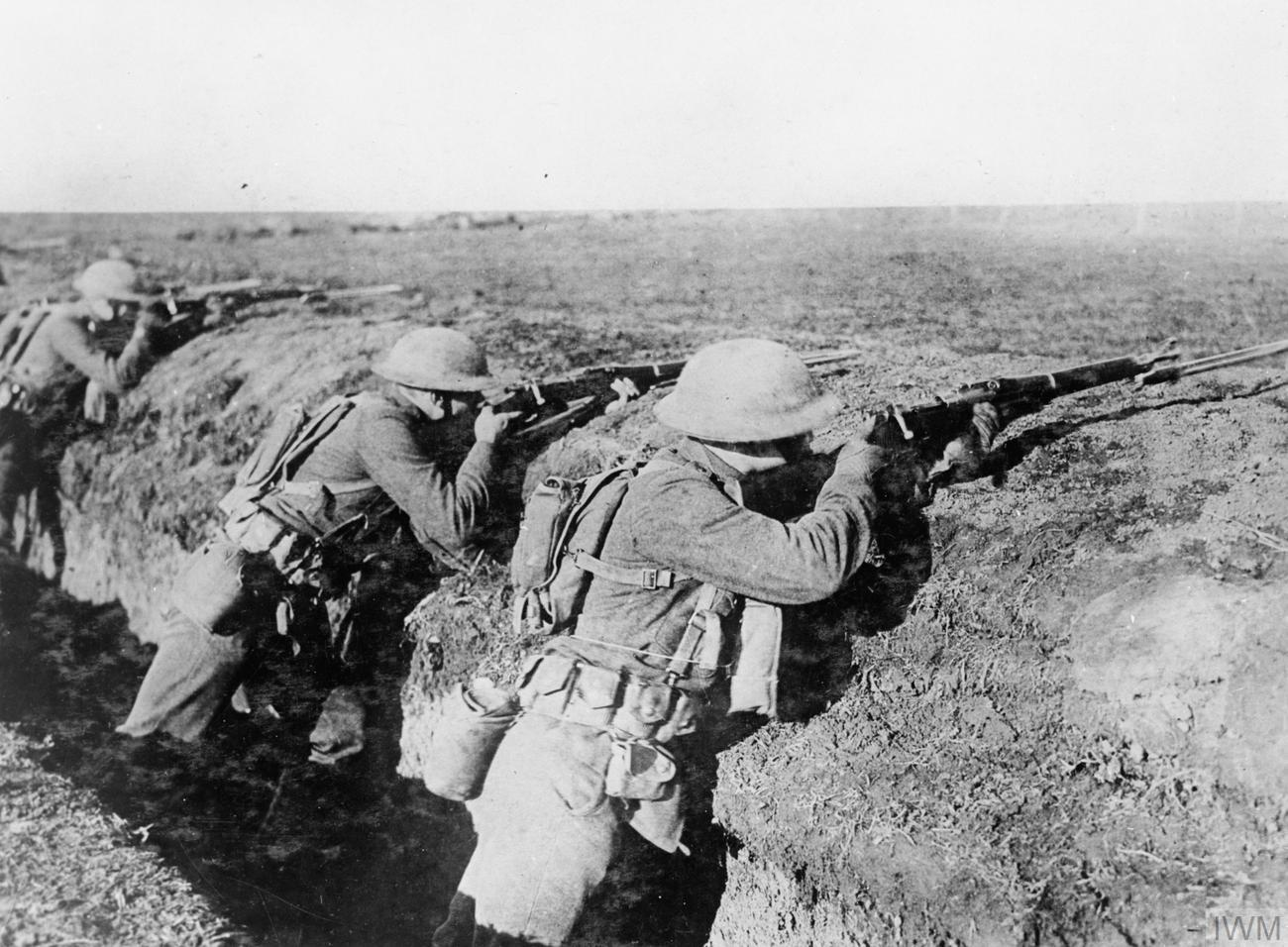
U.S. Marines ready to fire at the enemy in the trenches, Breuvannes-en-Bassigny, France

Near the end of the war in June 1918, Marines were landed at Vladivostok in Russia to protect American citizens at the consulate and other places from the fighting of the Russian Civil War. That August, the Allies would intervene on the side of the White Russians against the Bolsheviks to protect the Czechoslovak Legions and Allied materiel from capture. Marines would return on 16 February 1920, this time to Russky Island to protect communications infrastructure, until 19 November 1922.

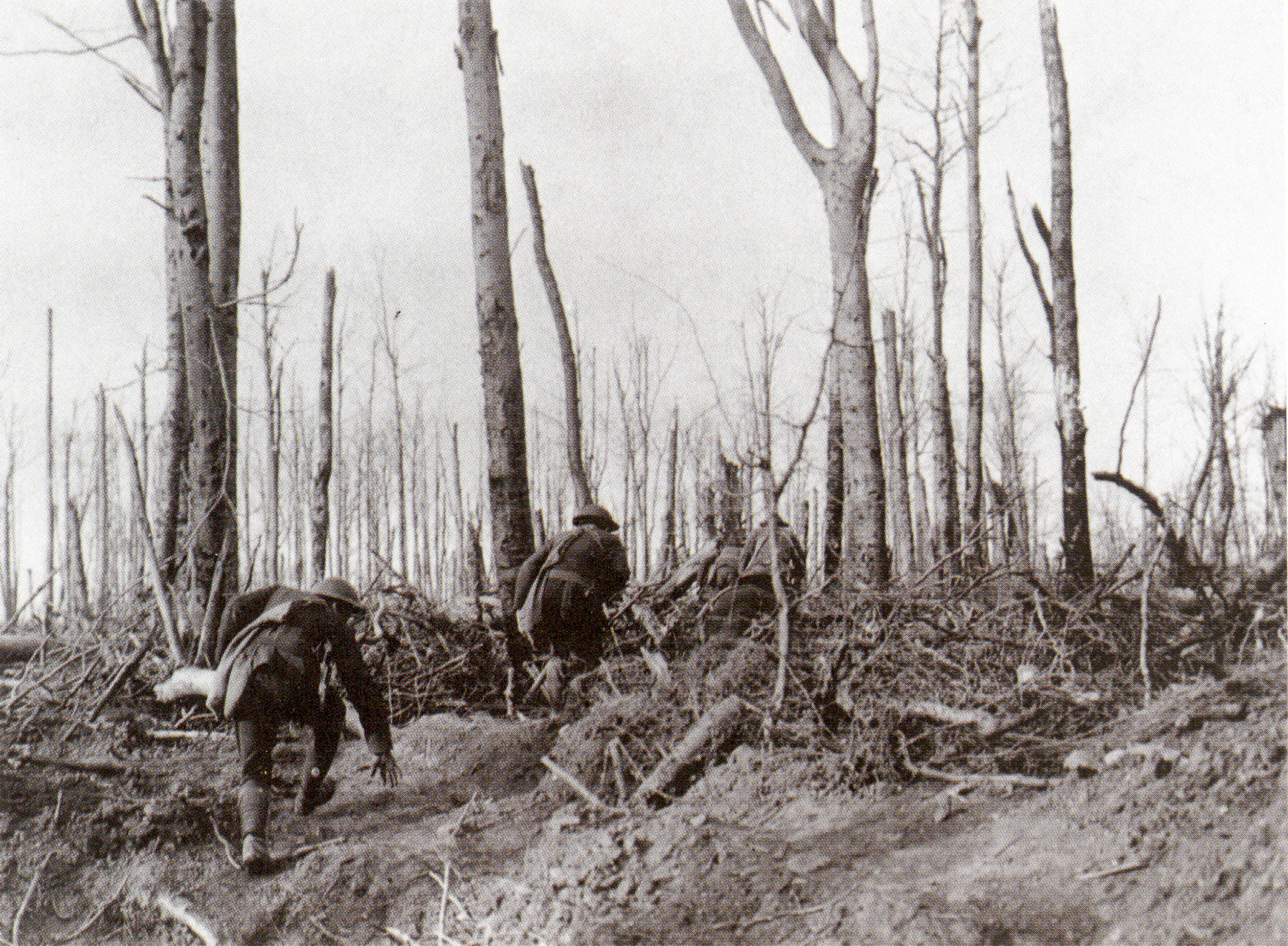
U.S. Marines during the Meuse–Argonne offensive

Opha May Johnson was the first woman to enlist in the Marines; she joined the Marine Corps Reserve in 1918, officially becoming the first female Marine. From then until the end of World War I, 305 women enlisted in the Corps.

The Marine Corps had entered the war with 511 officers and 13,214 enlisted personnel and, by 11 November 1918, had reached a strength of 2,400 officers and 70,000 enlisted. The war cost 2,461 dead and 9,520 wounded Marines, while eight would earn the Medal of Honor. Most of the deaths came from the worldwide Spanish flu epidemic.

== A new amphibious mission ==
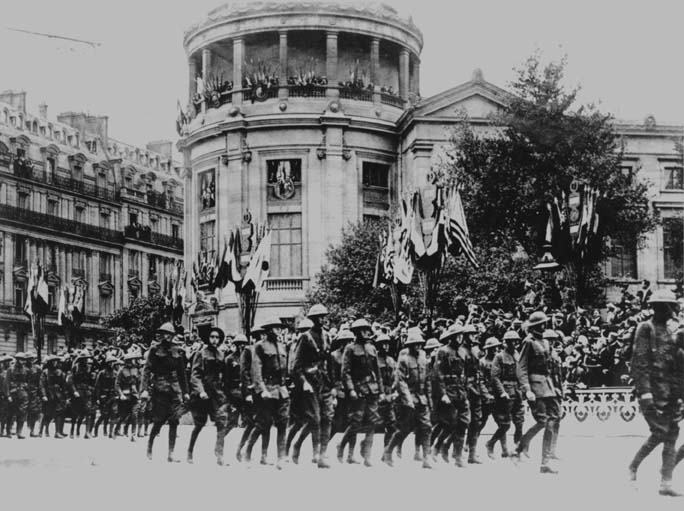
Victorious Marines parade in France in November 1918

Between the world wars, the Marine Corps was headed by Major General John A. Lejeune, another popular commandant. The Marine Corps was searching for an expanded mission after World War I. It was used in France as a junior version of the army infantry, and Marines realized that was a dead end. In the early 20th century they had acquired the new mission of police control of Central American countries partly occupied by the US. That mission became another dead end when the nation adopted a "Good Neighbor Policy" toward Latin America, and renounced further invasions. The corps needed a new mission, one distinct from the army. It found one: it would be a fast-reacting, light infantry fighting force carried rapidly to far off locations by the navy. Its special role was amphibious landings on enemy-held islands, but it took years to figure out how to do that. The Mahanian notion of a decisive fleet battle required forward bases for the navy close to the enemy. After the Spanish–American War the Marines gained the mission of occupying and defending those forward bases, and they began a training program on Culebro Island, Puerto Rico. The emphasis at first was on defending the forward base against enemy attack.

As early as 1900 the Navy's General Board considered building advance bases for naval operations in the Pacific and the Caribbean. The Marine Corps was given a defensive mission in 1920. The conceptual breakthrough came in 1921 when Major "Pete" Ellis wrote "Advanced Base Operations in Micronesia" a secret 30,000-word manifesto that proved inspirational to Marine strategists and highly prophetic. To win a war in the Pacific, the Navy would have to fight its way through thousands of miles of ocean controlled by the Japanese—including the Marshall, Caroline, Marianas and Ryukus island groups. If the Navy could land Marines to seize selected islands, they could become forward bases. Ellis argued that with an enemy prepared to defend the beaches, success depended on high-speed movement of waves of assault craft, covered by heavy naval gunfire and attack from the air. He predicted the decision would take place on the beach itself, so the assault teams would need not just infantry but also machine gun units, light artillery, light tanks, and combat engineers to defeat beach obstacles and defenses. Assuming the enemy had its own artillery, the landing craft would have to be specially built to protect the landing force. With American naval control, the Japanese would be unable to land new forces on the islands under attack.

Not knowing which of the many islands would be the American target, the Japanese would have to disperse their strength by garrisoning many islands that would never be attacked. An island like Eniwetok in the Marshall Islands, would, Ellis estimated, require two regiments, or 4,000 Marines. (Indeed, in February 1944 the Marines seized Eniwetok with 4,000 men in three battalions.) Guided by Marine observer airplanes, and supplemented by Marine light bombers, warships would provide sea-going artillery firepower so that Marines would not need any heavy artillery (in contrast to the Army, which relied heavily on its artillery.) Shelling defended islands was a new mission for warships. The Ellis model was officially endorsed in 1927 by the Joint Board of the Army and Navy (a forerunner of the Joint Chiefs of Staff).

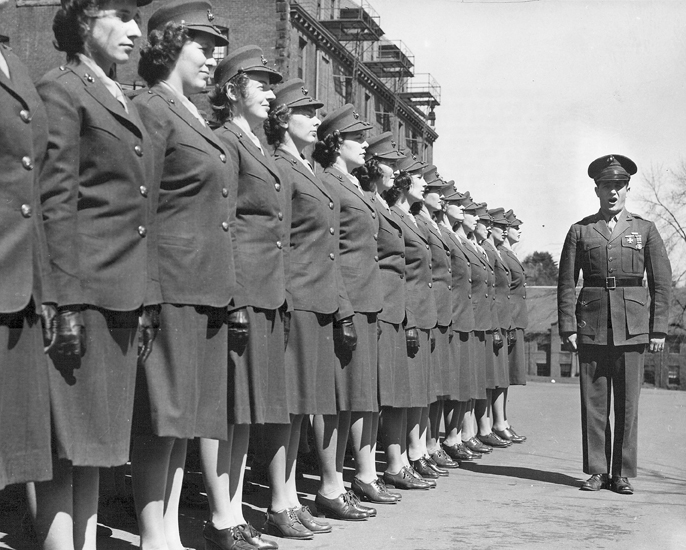
The first group of 71 Women Marine Officer Candidates arrived 13 March 1943 at the U.S. Midshipmen School (Women's Reserve) at Mount Holyoke College in Massachusetts.

Actual implementation of the new mission took another decade because the Corps was preoccupied in Central America, the Navy was slow to start training in how to support the landings, and new kinds of ships had to be invented to hit the beaches without massive casualties. In 1941 British and American ship architects invented new classes of "landing ships" to solve the problem. In World War II, the Navy contracted to build 1,150 LSTs, of which 332 would be cancelled or diverted to allies or converted for use as auxiliaries. They were large (2400 tons) and slow (10 knots); officially known as Landing Ship, Tank, the passengers called them "Large Stationary Targets." Lightly armored, they could steam cross the ocean with a full load on their own power, carrying infantry, tanks and supplies directly onto the beaches. Another type of ship, the LSD or Landing Ship, Dock, could carry three dozen Landing Craft Mechanized (LCU) with Marines, vehicles, and materiel in a flooding well deck for launching; 21 of these ships were built for U.S. service. Together with 2,000 other landing craft and ships, the LSDs and LSTs gave the Marines (and Army soldiers) a protected, quick way to make combat landings, beginning in summer 1943. (Note: The naval historian Norman Friedman would write in U.S. Amphibious Ships and Craft: An Illustrated Design History (Naval Institute Press, 2002, pg 130) that "Unlike the LST, the LSD was well adapted to the style of amphibious warfare the United States intended to execute in the Central Pacific." Both types were originally designed with European landings in mind, hence the British involvement.)

In 1933, a "Fleet Marine Force" was established with the primary mission of amphibious landings. The Force was a brigade with attached Marine aviation units that were trained in observation and ground support. By paying special attention to communications between ground and air, and between shore and sea, they developed an integrated three-dimensional assault force. By 1940, having adding enough men, the appropriate equipment, and a rigorous training program, the Marine Corps had worked out, in theory, its doctrine of amphibious assaults. Under the combat leadership of Holland "Howlin Mad" Smith, the general most responsible for training, the Marines were ready to hit the beaches.

The Corps acquired amphibious equipment such as the Higgins boat (LCVP), the Amtrak (LTV), and the DUKW, which would prove of great use in the upcoming conflict. The various Fleet Landing Exercises were a test and demonstration of the Corps' growing amphibious capabilities.

Marine aviation also saw significant growth in assets; on 7 December 1941, Marine aviation consisted of 13 flying squadrons and 230 aircraft. The oldest squadron in the Corps, known today as VMFA-232, was commissioned on 1 September 1925, as VF-3M.

== World War II ==
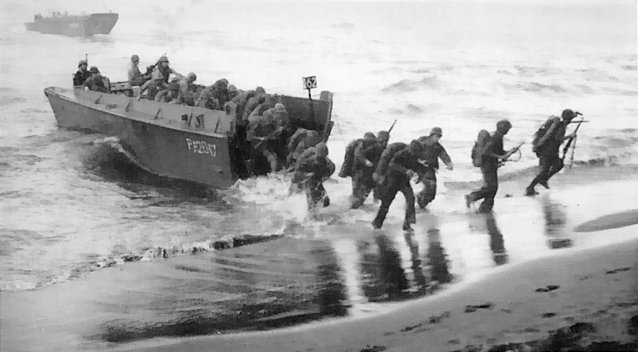
Marines land at Cape Torokina during the Bougainville Campaign.

In World War II, the Marines played a central role in the Pacific War, participating in nearly every significant island battle. The Corps also saw its peak growth as it expanded from two brigades to two corps with six divisions, and five air wings with 132 squadrons. In addition, 20 Defense Battalions were also set up, as well as a Parachute Battalion. In all, the Corps totaled at a maximum end strength of over 475,000 Marines, the highest in its history. The battles of Guadalcanal, Tarawa, Saipan, Guam, Peleliu, Iwo Jima, and Okinawa saw fierce fighting between U.S. Marines and the Imperial Japanese Army. The first African American recruits were accepted in 1942 to begin the desegregation of the Corps.

During the battle for Iwo Jima, photographer Joe Rosenthal took the famous photo Raising of the Flag on Iwo Jima of five Marines and one Navy corpsman raising the American flag on Mount Suribachi. Secretary of the Navy James Forrestal, who had come ashore earlier that day to observe the progress of the troops, said of the flag raising on Iwo Jima, "...the raising of that flag on Suribachi means a Marine Corps for the next five hundred years." The acts of the Marines during the war added to their already significant popular reputation, and the Marine Corps War Memorial adjacent to Arlington National Cemetery was dedicated in 1954.

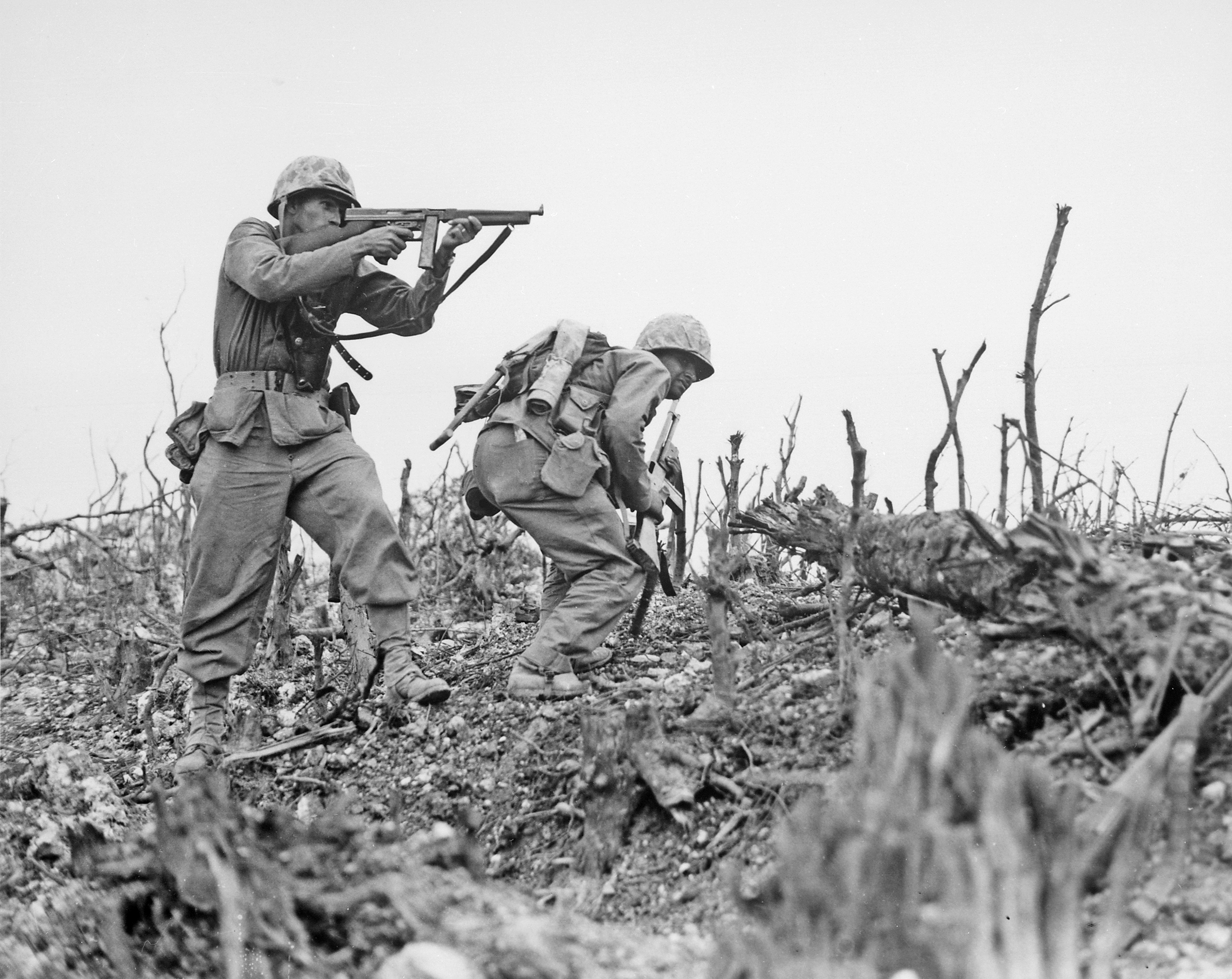
Marines at Okinawa

As the Marine Corps grew to its maximum size, Marine aviation also peaked at 5 air wings, 31 aircraft groups and 145 flying squadrons. The Battle of Guadalcanal would teach several lessons, such as the debilitating effects of not having air superiority, the vulnerability of unescorted targets (such as transport shipping), and the vital importance of quickly acquiring expeditionary airfields during amphibious operations. After being dissatisfied with Navy air support at the Battle of Tarawa, General Holland Smith recommended that Marines should do the job, put into effect at New Georgia. The Bougainville and 2nd Philippines campaigns saw the establishment of air liaison parties to coordinate air support with the Marines fighting on the ground, and the Battle of Okinawa brought most of it together with the establishment of aviation command and control in the form of Landing Force Air Support Control Units

Though the vast majority of Marines served in the Pacific Theater, a number of Marines did play a role in the European Theater, North Africa, and Middle East. The largest Marine unit in Europe was the 1st Provisional Marine Brigade, which served in Iceland from July 1941 through March 1942 before transfer to the Pacific. Most others served aboard warships and as guards for naval bases, especially in the British Isles; though some volunteered for duty with the Office of Strategic Services. Numerous observers were dispatched to learn tactics from other allied nations, such as Roy Geiger aboard HMS Formidable. Interservice rivalry may have played a role in this; for example, when briefed of a plan for Project Danny, Army Chief of Staff General George Marshall stood and walked out, stating "That's the end of this briefing. As long as I'm in charge, there'll never be a Marine in Europe."

By the war's end, the Corps had grown to include six divisions, five air wings and supporting troops totaling about 485,000 Marines. 19,733 Marines were killed and 68,207 wounded during WWII and 82 received the Medal of Honor. Marine Aviators were credited with shooting down 2,355 Japanese aircraft while losing 573 of their own in combat, as well as 120 earning ace.

=== Interim: WWII-Korea ===
The bended knee is not a tradition of our Corps. If the Marine as a fighting man has not made a case for himself after 170 years of service, he must go. But I think you will agree with me that he has earned the right to depart with dignity and honor, not by subjugation to the status of uselessness and servility planned for him by the War Department.

— General Alexander Vandegrift, 18th Commandant in a speech to the Senate Committee on Naval Affairs in 1946

Despite Secretary Forrestal's prediction, the Corps faced an immediate institutional crisis following the war. Army brass pushing for a strengthened and reorganized defense establishment also attempted to fold the Marine mission and assets into the Navy and Army. Drawing on hastily assembled Congressional support, the Marine Corps rebuffed such efforts to legislatively dismantle the Corps, resulting in statutory protection of the Marine Corps in the National Security Act of 1947. Despite the introspective crisis, Marines also suffered from major post-war cutbacks and drawdowns in size. For example, aviation fell from 116,628 personnel and 103 squadrons on 31 August 1945 to 14,163 personnel and 21 squadrons on 30 June 1948, with another 30 squadrons in the reserves.

Secretary of Defense Louis A. Johnson in particular singled the Navy and Marine Corps out for budget cuts. A strong believer in unification and the idea that the United States' monopoly on the atomic bomb was adequate protection against any and all external threats, he began a campaign to strip away much of America's military power, especially naval and amphibious. Shortly after his appointment, Johnson had a conversation with Admiral Richard L. Connally, giving a revealing look at his attitudes towards the Navy and Marine Corps and any need for non-nuclear forces:

Admiral, the Navy is on its way out. There's no reason for having a Navy and a Marine Corps. General Bradley tells me amphibious operations are a thing of the past. We’ll never have any more amphibious operations. That does away with the Marine Corps. And the Air Force can do anything the Navy can do, so that does away with the Navy.

The Marines were included in the Women's Armed Services Integration Act in 1948, which gave women permanent status in the Regular and Reserve forces of the Marines.

President Harry S. Truman had a well-known dislike of the Marines dating back to his service in World War I, and would say in anger in August 1950, "The Marine Corps is the Navy's police force and as long as I am President, that is what it will remain. They have a propaganda machine that is almost equal to Stalin's." Johnson exploited this to reduce or eliminate many Marine Corps' budget requests. Johnson attempted to eliminate Marine Corps aviation entirely by transferring its air assets to the Navy and Air Force, and again proposed to progressively eliminate the Marine Corps altogether in a series of budget cutbacks and decommissioning of forces. Johnson ordered that the commandant be barred from attending Joint Chiefs of Staff meetings in his role of chief of service (including meetings involving Marine readiness or deployments), deleted him from the official roll of chiefs of service branches authorized a driver and limousine, and for whom a special gun salute was prescribed on ceremonial occasions. He further specified that there would be no future official recognition or celebration of the Marine Corps birthday. The Navy's surface fleet and amphibious ships were drastically reduced, and most landing craft were reserved for army use.

After Johnson announced the cancellation of the 65,000-ton USS United States, under construction and the Navy's hope to participate in strategic nuclear air operations, without consulting the Department of the Navy nor Congress, Secretary of the Navy John L. Sullivan abruptly resigned, beginning the Revolt of the Admirals. In June 1949, the House Committee on Armed Services launched an investigation into charges of malfeasance in office against Secretary Johnson. While ultimately cleared of any wrongdoing, the congressional rebuke weakened Johnson's power with the military and President Truman, and few subsequent cuts were made. After his severe cutbacks resulted in a military too weak to perform effectively in the initial days of the Korean War, Johnson resigned on 19 September 1950, replaced with George Marshall. Ironically, the Marines, as part of an amphibious corps with the US Army 7th division who deployed, and made an amphibious operation at Inchon at the opening of the war.

Shortly after, in 1952, the Douglas-Manfield Bill afforded the commandant an equal voice with the Joint Chiefs of Staff on matters relating to the Marines, and established the structure of three divisions and air wings that remains today. This allowed the Corps to permanently maintain a division and air wing in the Far East and participate in various small wars in Southeast Asia – in Tachen, Taiwan, Laos, Thailand, and Vietnam. A small guard force was sent to Jerusalem to protect the United States Consul General in 1948.

Marines would take a large role in the initial days Occupation of Japan, beginning with the 4th Marine Division landing at Kanagawa on 28 August 1945, just 13 days after Emperor Hirohito announced surrender. It was soon replaced by the Eighth United States Army in 1946. About 50,000 Marines would take part in the post-war occupation of North China from 1945 until 1947, and would reappear in 1948 and 1949. III Amphibious Corps would control major infrastructure points and repatriate Japanese and Soviet troops, as well as evacuate Americans when the Chinese Communist Party began to win the Chinese Civil War.

Despite cuts in number, Marine aviation did progress in technology: propeller aircraft were gradually phased out as jet aircraft improved and helicopters were developed for use in amphibious operations. The first Marine jet squadron came in November 1947 when VMF-122 fielded the FH Phantom, while HMX-1, the first Marine helicopter squadron, stood up in November 1947. General Geiger had observed the atomic bomb tests at Bikini Atoll the year earlier and instantly recognized that atomic bombs could render amphibious landings difficult because of the dense concentrations of troops, ships, and materiel at the beachhead. The Hogaboom Board recommended that the Marine Corps develop transport helicopters in order to allow a more diffuse attack on enemy shores, resulting in HMX-1 and the acquisition of Sikorsky HO3S-1 and the Piasecki HRP-1 helicopters. Refining the concept for several years, Marines would use the term "vertical envelopment" instead of "air mobility" or "air assault".

== Korean War ==
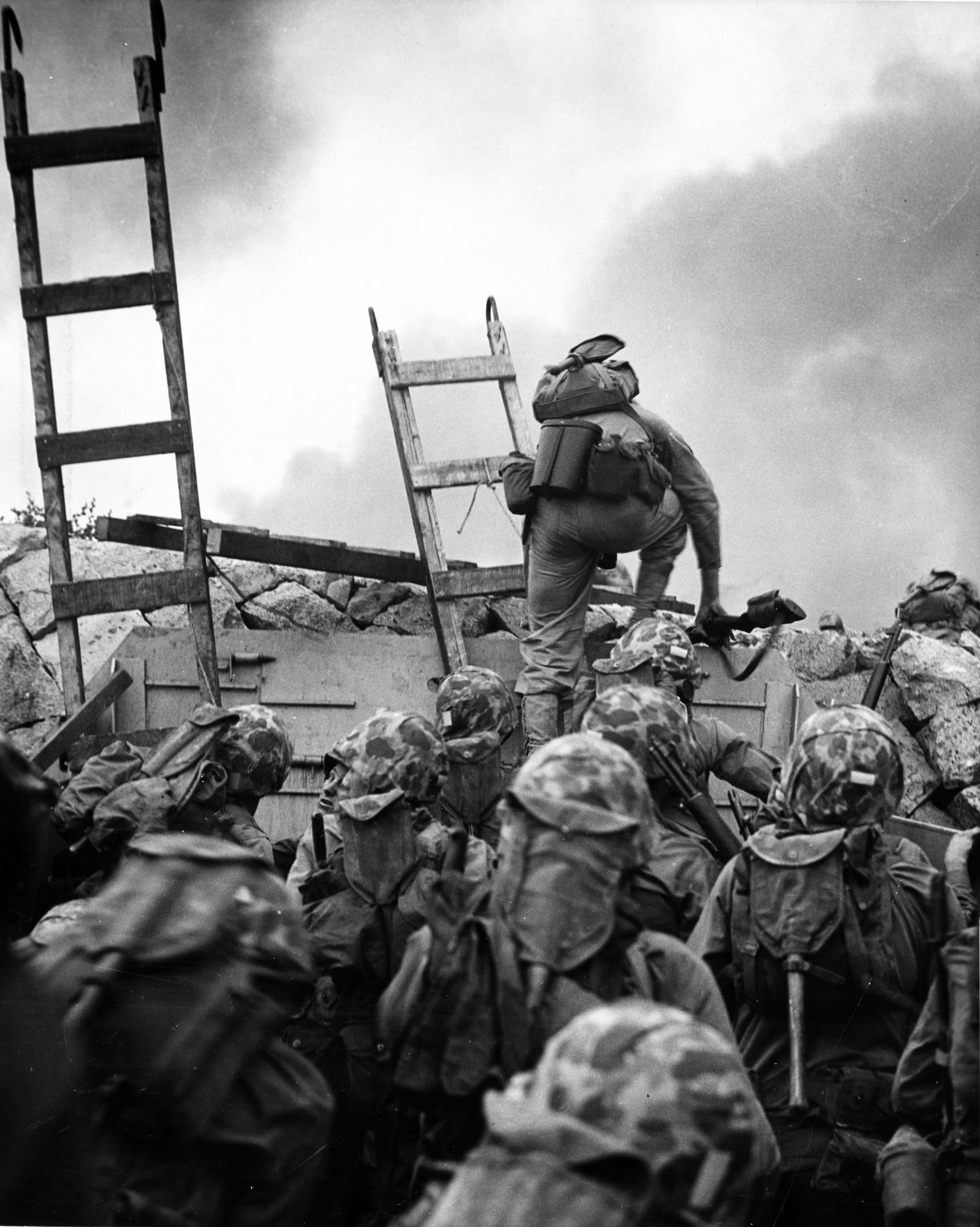
Medal of Honor recipient First Lieutenant Baldomero Lopez leading his men over the seawall at Inchon on the day of his death

The Korean War (1950–1953) saw the hastily formed 1st Provisional Marine Brigade holding the line at the Battle of Pusan Perimeter, where Marine helicopters (VMO-6 flying the HO3S1 helicopter) made their combat debut. To execute a flanking maneuver, General Douglas MacArthur called on Marine air and ground forces to make an amphibious landing at the Battle of Inchon. The successful landing resulted in the collapse of North Korean lines and the pursuit of North Korean forces north near the Yalu River until the surprise entrance of the People's Republic of China into the war which overwhelmed the overextended and outnumbered U.S. forces. 1st Marine Division, while attached to the Army's X Corps regrouped and inflicted heavy casualties during their fighting withdrawal to the coast of Hungnam. Now known as the Battle of Chosin Reservoir, it entered Marine lore as an example of the toughness and resolve of the Marine.

After their evacuation from Hungnam, 1st Marine Division would go on to participate in some of the most important battles of the war until the signing of the armistice in 1953. These included the First and second battles of Wonju, Operation Ripper, Chinese spring offensive and UN May–June 1951 counteroffensive. 1st Marine Division played a central role in repelling the Chinese assault at the Battle of the Samichon River, the final battle of the war.

The Korean War saw the Marine Corps rebound from its drastic cuts of about 75,000 at the start to a force, by the end of the conflict in 1953, of 261,000 Marines, most of whom were reservists. Aviation grew to four air wings, 20 aircraft groups and 78 flying squadrons, a level that has remained more or less consistent to this day. 4,267 Marines were killed and 23,744 wounded during the war, while 42 were awarded the Medal of Honor.

=== Interim: Korea-Vietnam ===
In the intervening years, Marines would continue to be dispatched to regional crises. During the Suez Crisis in the fall of 1956, Marines from 3rd Battalion 3rd Marines evacuated Americans from Alexandria. In 1958, Marines were dispatched to Lebanon as part of Operation Blue Bat in response to the crisis there. Marines returned to Cuba from 1959 to 1960 to protect Americans during the Cuban Revolution. 5,000 Marines were sent to Thailand on 17 May 1962 to support the government's struggles against Communists until withdrawn on 30 July.

Marines also returned to Santo Domingo for Operation Power Pack on 28 April 1965. Originally sent to evacuate Americans in the midst of fighting between forces loyal to assassinated dictator Rafael Trujillo and the Dominican Revolutionary Party supporting Juan Bosch, President Lyndon B. Johnson expanded the intervention to prevent a second Communist nation on America's doorstep. Joined by the 82nd Airborne Division and the Organization of American States, Marines quickly forced a cease-fire, but would continue to be harassed by small-scale combat and sniper fire until their withdrawal on 31 August. Remaining peacekeepers enforced a truce, and Bosch would never regain power.

== Vietnam War ==
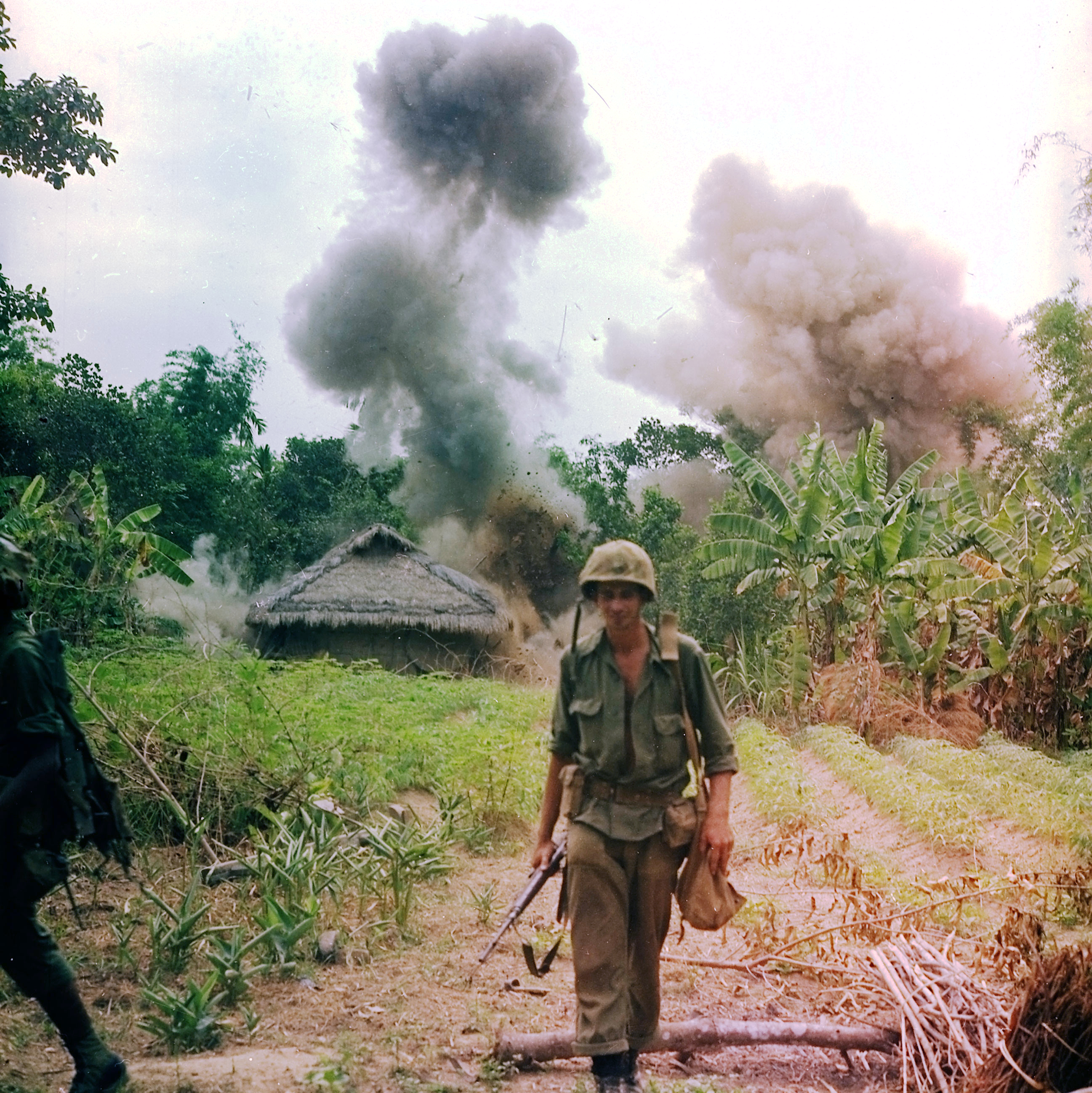
Marines of Operation Georgia destroyed facilities used by the Viet Cong in 1966.

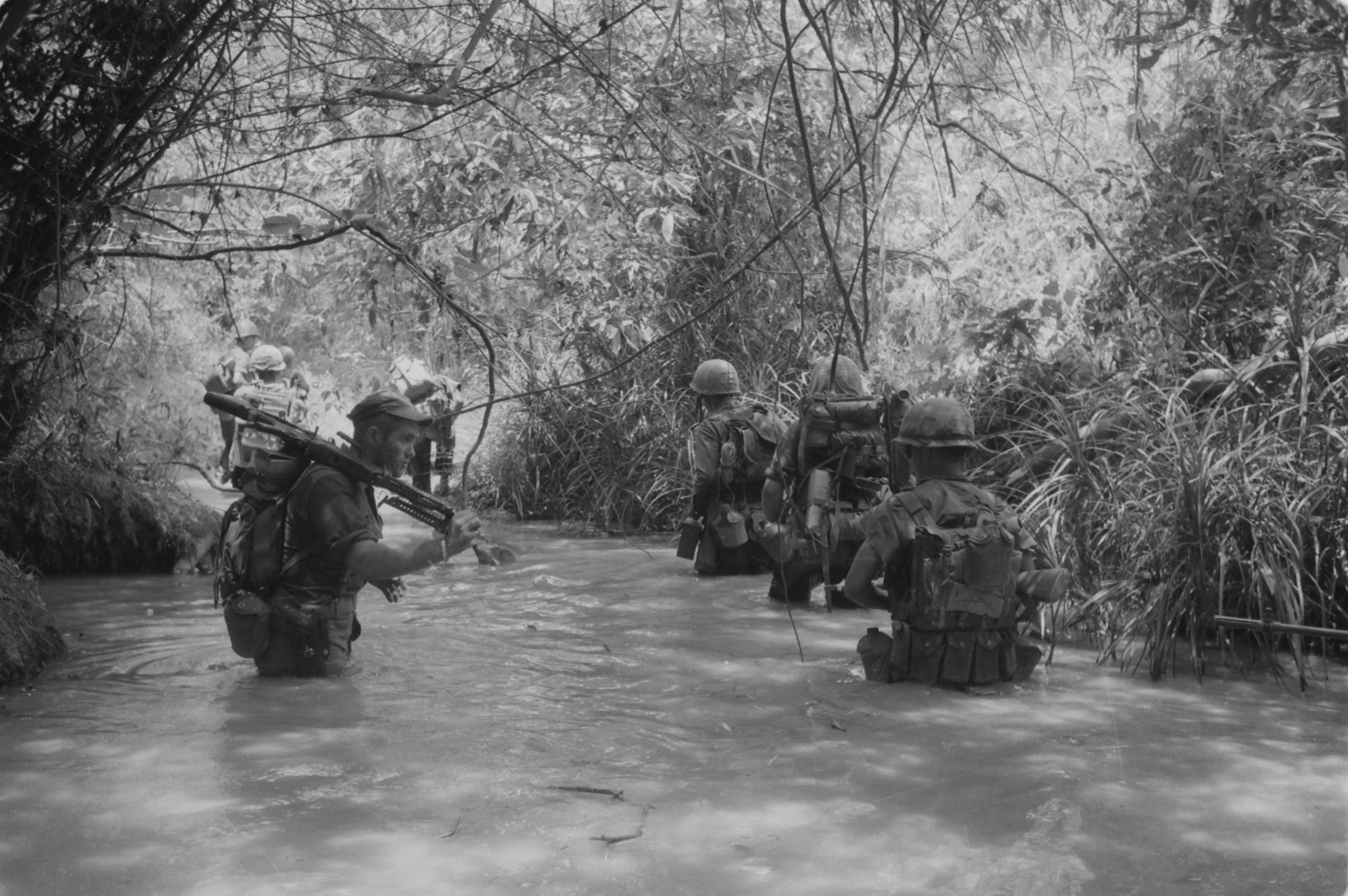
Marines on patrol at Dong Ha for Operation Hastings in July 1966

The Marines also played an important role in the Vietnam War at battles such as Da Nang, Huế, and Khe Sanh. The Marines operated in the northern I Corps regions of South Vietnam and fought both a constant guerilla war against the Viet Cong and an off and on conventional war against North Vietnamese Army regulars. Marines also conducted the less well-known Combined Action Program that implemented unconventional techniques for counterinsurgency warfare. The Marine presence was withdrawn in 1971, but returned briefly in 1975 to evacuate Saigon and attempt to rescue the crew of the Mayagüez. 13,091 Marines were killed and 88,594 wounded during the war. As a footnote, the Marines in Vietnam suffered more casualties than both WWI and WWII combined, and 58 were awarded the Medal of Honor.

=== Interim: post-Vietnam War ===
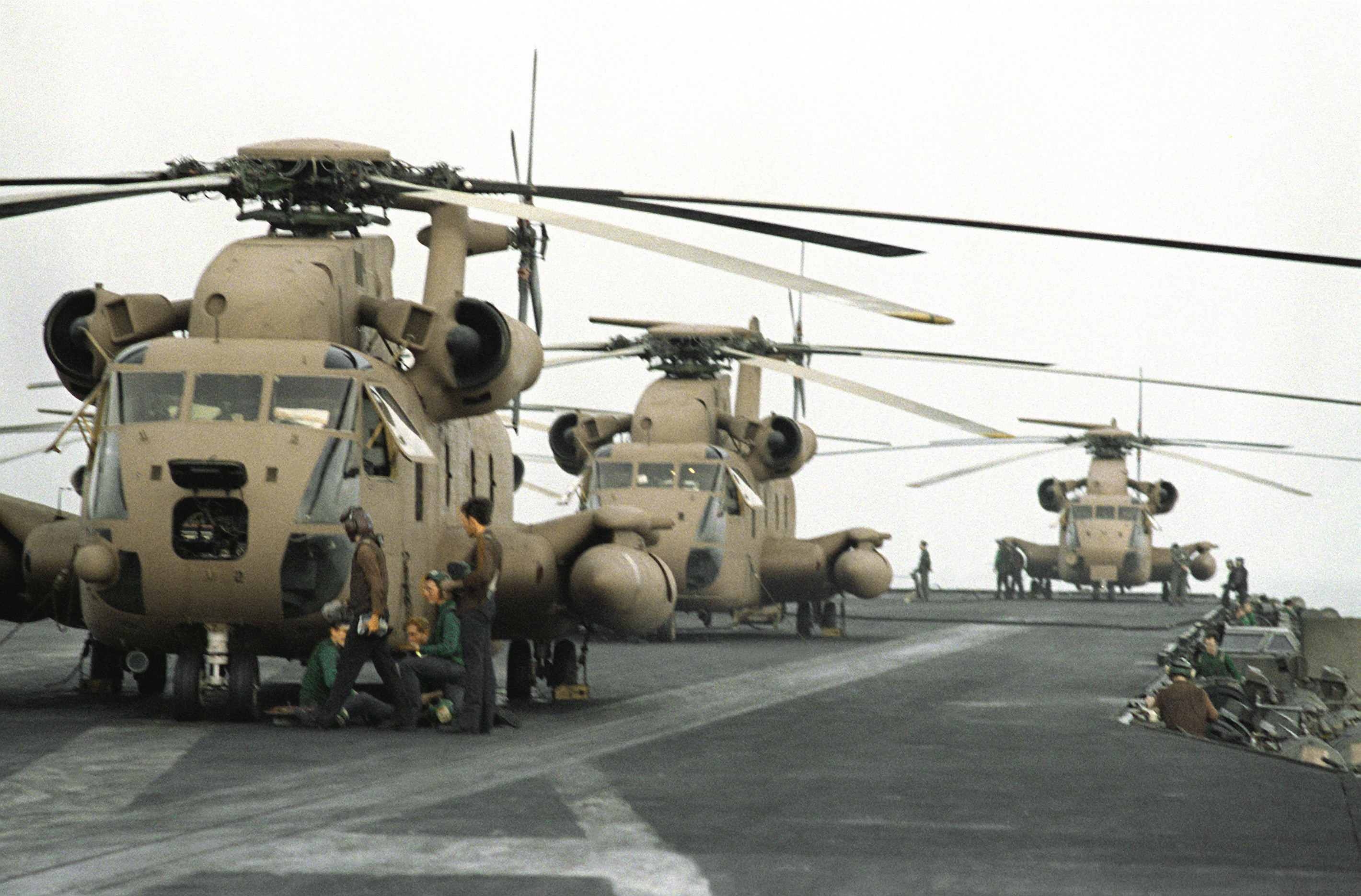
Repainted Sea Stallions on the deck of USS Nimitz in preparation for Operation Eagle Claw

Returning from South Vietnam, the Marine Corps hit one of the lowest points in its history with high rates of courts-martial, non-judicial punishments, unauthorized absences, and outright desertions. The re-making of the Marine Corps began in the late 1970s when policies for discharging inadequate Marines were relaxed leading to the removal of the worst performing ones. Once the quality of new recruits started to improve, the Marines began reforming their NCO corps, an absolutely vital element in the functioning of the Marine Corps. After Vietnam, the Marine Corps resumed its expeditionary role.

On 4 November 1979, Islamist students supporting the so-called Iranian Revolution stormed the Embassy of the United States in Tehran and took 53 hostages, including the Marine Security Guards. Marine helicopter pilots took part in Operation Eagle Claw, the disastrous rescue attempt on 24 April 1980. An unexpected sandstorm grounded several RH-53 helicopters, as well as scattering the rest, and ultimately killing several when one struck an EC-130 Hercules staged to refuel them. The mission was aborted, and the Algiers Accords negotiated the release of the hostages on 20 January 1981. The mission demonstrated the need for an aircraft that could take off and land vertically, but had greater speed than a helicopter, realized decades later in the V-22 Osprey.

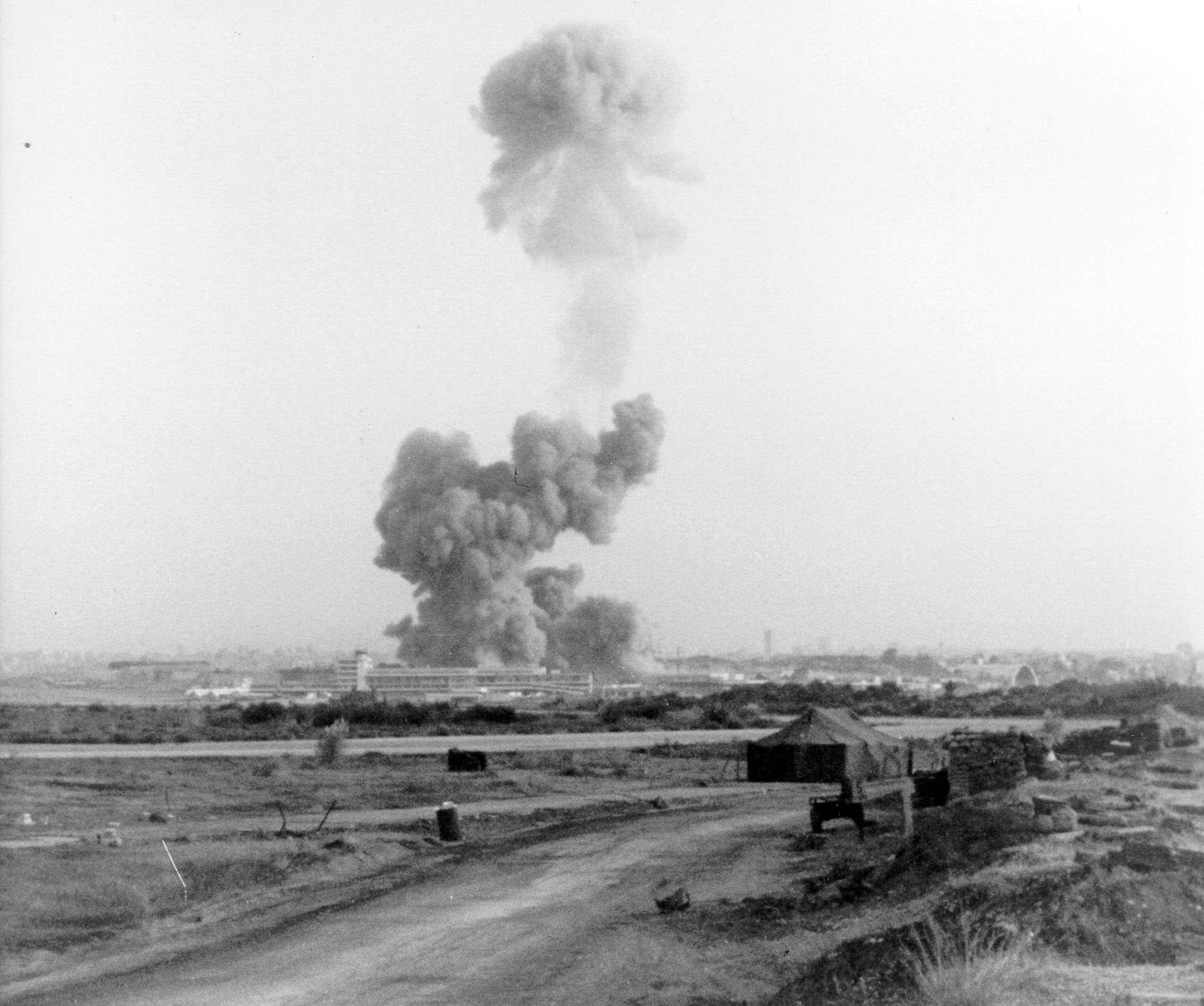
The 23 October 1983 Beirut barracks bombing killed 241 American peacekeepers, many of them U.S. Marines.

Marines returned to Beirut during the 1982 Lebanon War on 24 August with the arrival of the 32nd Marine Amphibious Unit (later redesignated as 22nd Marine Expeditionary Unit) and the Multinational Force in Lebanon (MNF). As part of a peace treaty, the Palestine Liberation Organization was withdrawn to Tunisia, and the Marines returned to their ships. Due to increased violence from the still-ongoing Lebanese Civil War, President Ronald Reagan ordered the Marines to return on 29 September in the form of 2nd Battalion 8th Marines. Relieved by 3rd Battalion 8th Marines in October, the MNF increasingly drew fire from different factions. The United States embassy was bombed on 18 April 1983 in opposition to the MNF's presence; 1st Battalion 8th Marines was rotated in under the command of the 24th MAU. On 23 October 1983, the Marine barracks in Beirut was bombed, causing the highest peacetime losses to the Corps in its history: 220 Marines, 18 sailors, and three soldiers, as well as 55 French Paratroopers of the 1st Parachute Chasseur Regiment and 3 French Paratroopers of the 9th Parachute Chasseur Regiment in a near-simultaneous bombing 6 kilometres (3.7 mi) away. As violence increased, public pressure mounted to withdraw forces from Lebanon. After an additional 24 American deaths, the Marines were ordered to leave and began on 7 February 1984, and finished on the 26th.

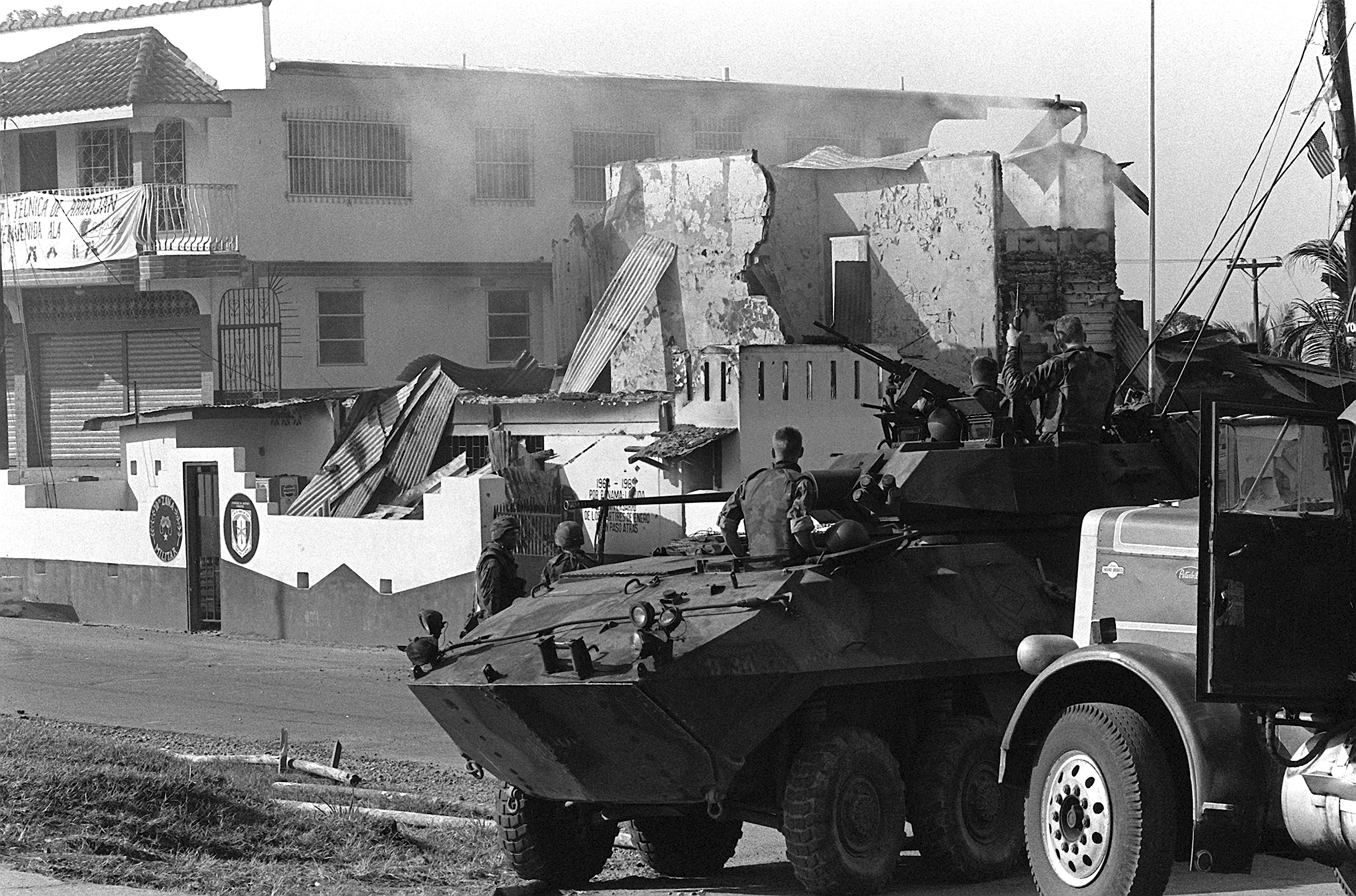
Marines from 2nd Light Armored Infantry Battalion man a LAV-25 during the invasion of Panama in December 1989.

Marines recovered from this low point and began a series of successes. The Invasion of Grenada, known as "Operation Urgent Fury", began on 25 October 1983 in response to a coup by Bernard Coard and possible "Soviet-Cuban militarization" on the island. The 22nd Marine Amphibious Unit quickly took the northern sectors, and were withdrawn by 15 December. Interservice rivalry and cooperation issues shown during the invasion resulted in the Goldwater–Nichols Act of 1986 altering the chain of command in the United States military. When Operation Classic Resolve began on 2 December 1989 in the Philippines (in retaliation for the coup attempt), a company of Marines was dispatched from Naval Base Subic Bay to protect the Embassy of the United States in Manila. The Invasion of Panama, known as "Operation Just Cause" began on 20 December of the same year, and deposed the military dictator Manuel Noriega.

== The 1990s ==
=== Gulf War ===
Marines were also responsible for liberating Kuwait during the Persian Gulf War of 1990 and 1991, as the Army III, VII and XVIII corps made an attack to the west and north directly into Iraq to kill the Iraqi army and cut off forces in Kuwait. The I Marine Expeditionary Force had a strength of 92,990 making Operation Desert Storm the largest Marine Corps operation in history. A total of 24 Marines were killed in action or later died of wounds, while 92 were wounded.

=== Bosnian War ===
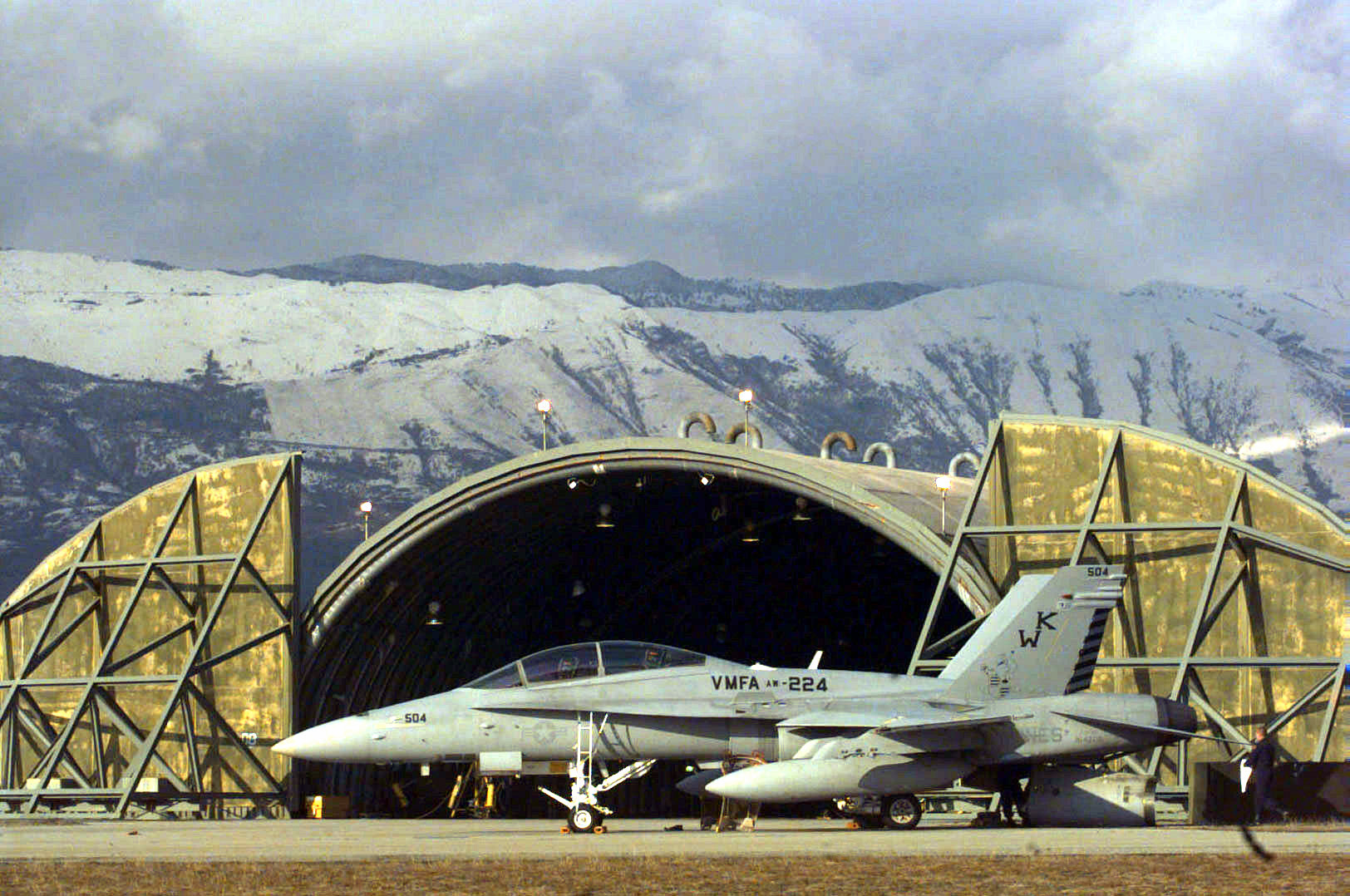
A F/A-18D from VMFA(AW)-224 parked at Aviano Air Base in preparation for an IFOR mission.

Marines played a modest role in the Bosnian War and NATO intervention. Operation Deny Flight began on 12 April 1993, to enforce the United Nations no-fly zone in Bosnia and Herzegovina and provide air support to the United Nations Protection Force. The F/A-18D Hornet was proven to be a "highly resourceful multirole platform", in addition to showcasing the importance of precision-guided munitions. In 1995, the mission was expanded to include a bombing campaign called "Operation Deliberate Force". On 2 June 1995, Air Force Captain Scott O'Grady's F-16 was shot down by a Bosnian Serb Army surface-to-air missile in the Mrkonjić Grad incident. Marines from the 24th MEU, based on the USS Kearsarge, rescued him from western Bosnia on 8 June. Marines would support the IFOR, SFOR, and KFOR until 1999. On 3 February 1998, an EA-6B Prowler from VMAQ-2, deployed to Aviano Air Base to support the peacekeeping effort, hit an aerial tram cable and killed 20 European passengers.

=== Other ===
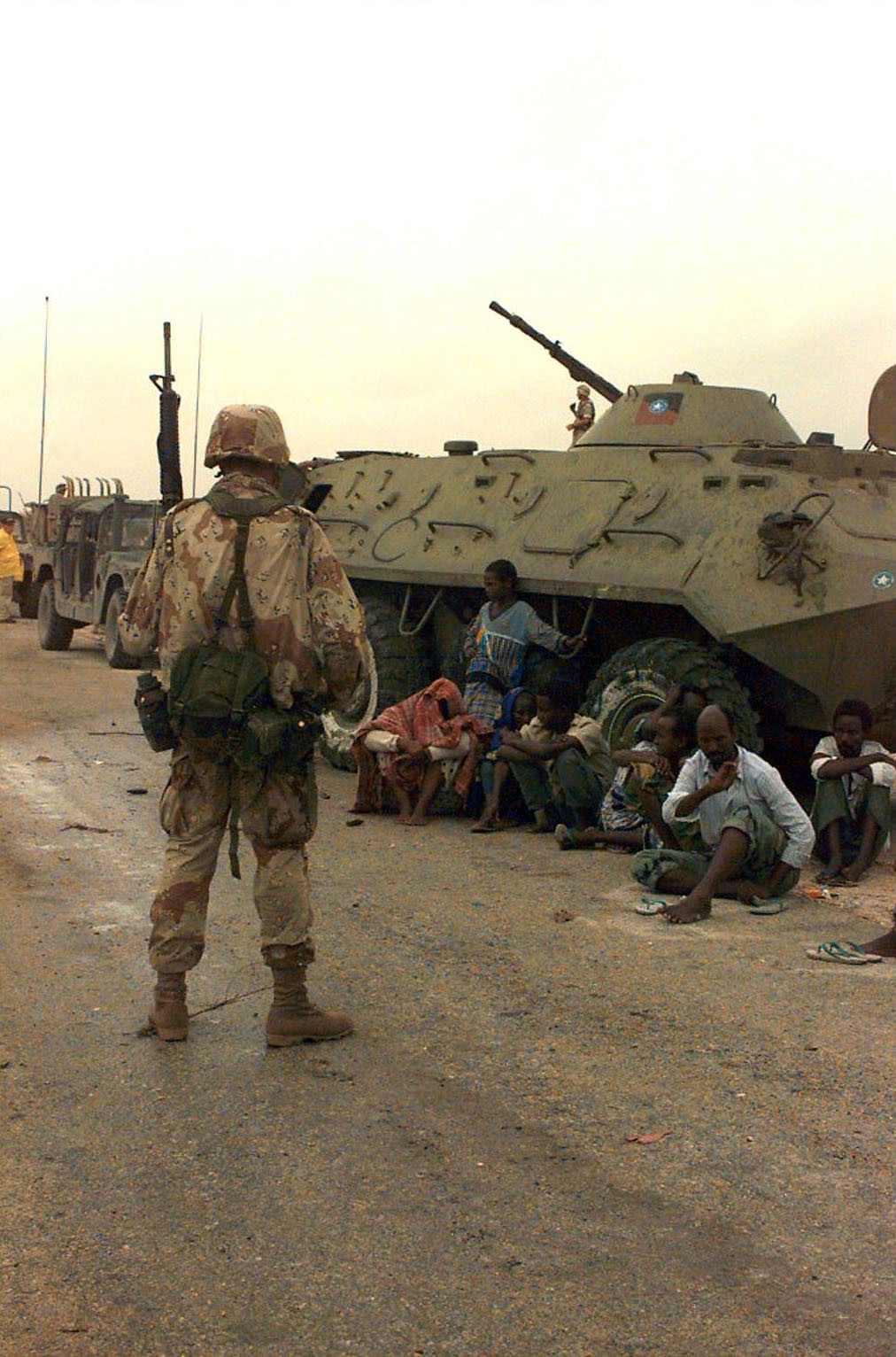
A U.S. Marine guards Somali prisoners in 1992.

In the summer of 1990, the 22nd and 26th Marine Expeditionary Units conducted Operation Sharp Edge, a noncombatant evacuation in the west Liberian city of Monrovia. Liberia suffered from civil war at the time, and citizens of the United States and other countries could not leave via conventional means. With only one reconnaissance team having come under fire with no casualties incurred on either side, the Marines evacuated several hundred civilians within hours to Navy vessels waiting offshore. On 8 April 1996, Marines returned for Operation Assured Response, helping in the evacuation of 2,444 foreign and United States citizens from Liberia. On 23 May 1996, President Bill Clinton diverted Marines from Joint Task Force Assured Response to Bangui, Central African Republic until 22 June, where they provided security to the American Embassy and evacuated 448 people. Due to increased threats against Americans as part of the fallout from the Lottery Uprising in Albania, 200 Marines and 10 Navy SEALs were deployed on 16 August 1998 to the American embassy there. As Indonesian occupation of East Timor ended in the fall of 1999, President Clinton authorized the 31st Marine Expeditionary Unit, based on the USS Belleau Wood, to deploy there until the International Force for East Timor could arrive in October.

Marines participated in combat operations in Somalia (1992–1995) during Operations Restore Hope, Restore Hope II, and United Shield. While Operation Restore Hope was designated as a humanitarian relief effort, Marine ground forces frequently engaged Somali militiamen in combat. Elements of Battalion Landing Team 2nd Battalion 9th Marines with 15th MEU were among the first troops of the United Nations effort to land in Somalia in December 1992, while Marines of Battalion Landing Team 3rd Battalion 1st Marines participated in the final withdrawal of United Nations troops from Somalia in 1995.

== Twenty-first century ==
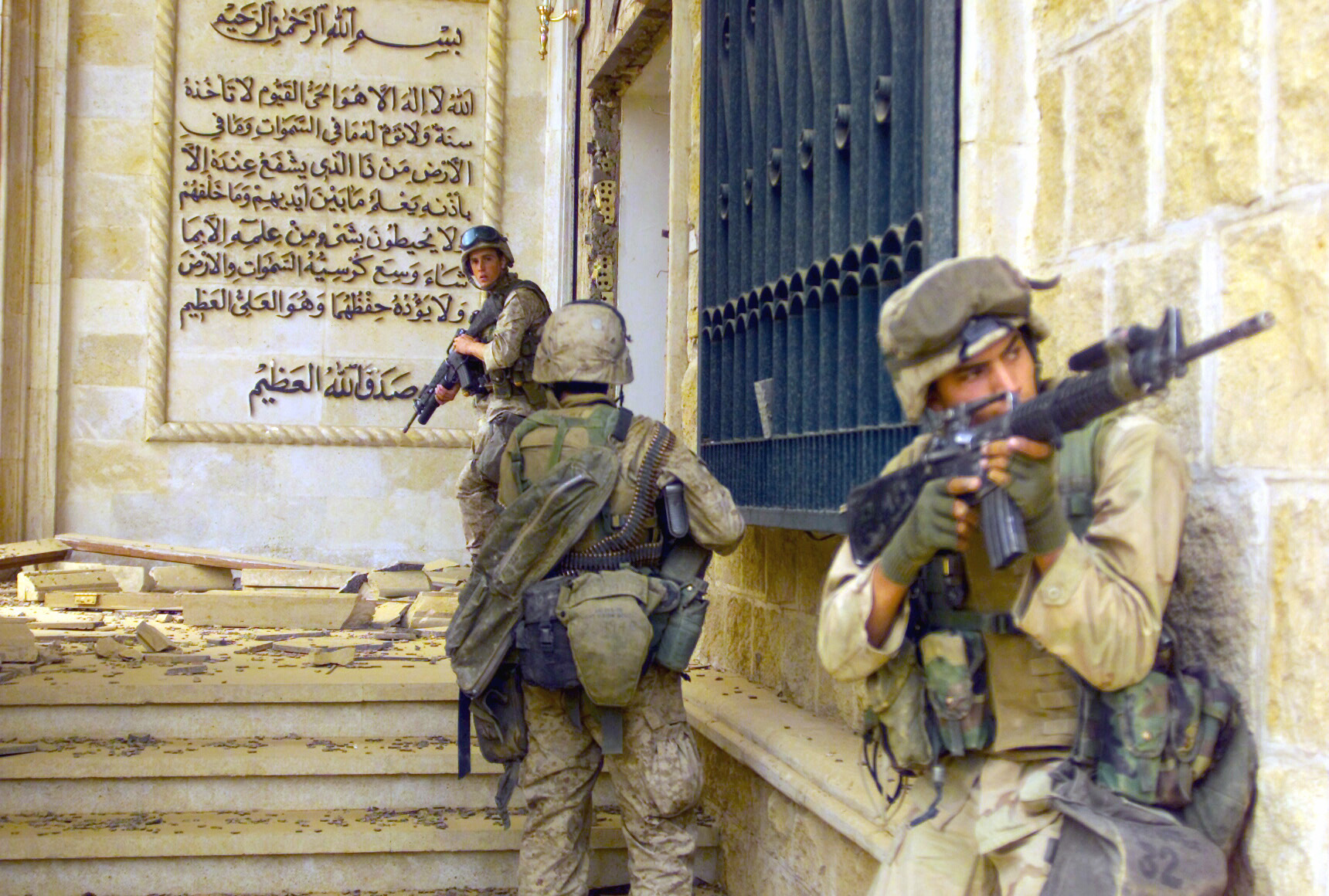
Marines from 1st Battalion 7th Marines enter a palace during the Battle of Baghdad in 2003.

Following the September 11 attacks of 2001, U.S. President George W. Bush announced the war on terrorism. The stated objective of the Global War on Terror is "the defeat of Al-Qaeda, other terrorist groups and any nation that supports or harbors terrorists". Since then, the Marine Corps, alongside other military and federal agencies, has engaged in global operations around the world in support of that mission.

In 2002, Combined Joint Task Force – Horn of Africa was stood up at Camp Lemonnier, Djibouti, to provide regional security. Despite transferring overall command to the Navy in 2006, the Marines continued to operate in the Horn of Africa into 2010.

In the summer of 2006, Marines from the 24th MEU evacuated Americans from Lebanon and Israel in light of the fighting of the 2006 Lebanon War. The 22nd and 24th MEUs returned to Haiti after the 2010 earthquake in January as part of Operation Unified Response.

=== War in Afghanistan ===
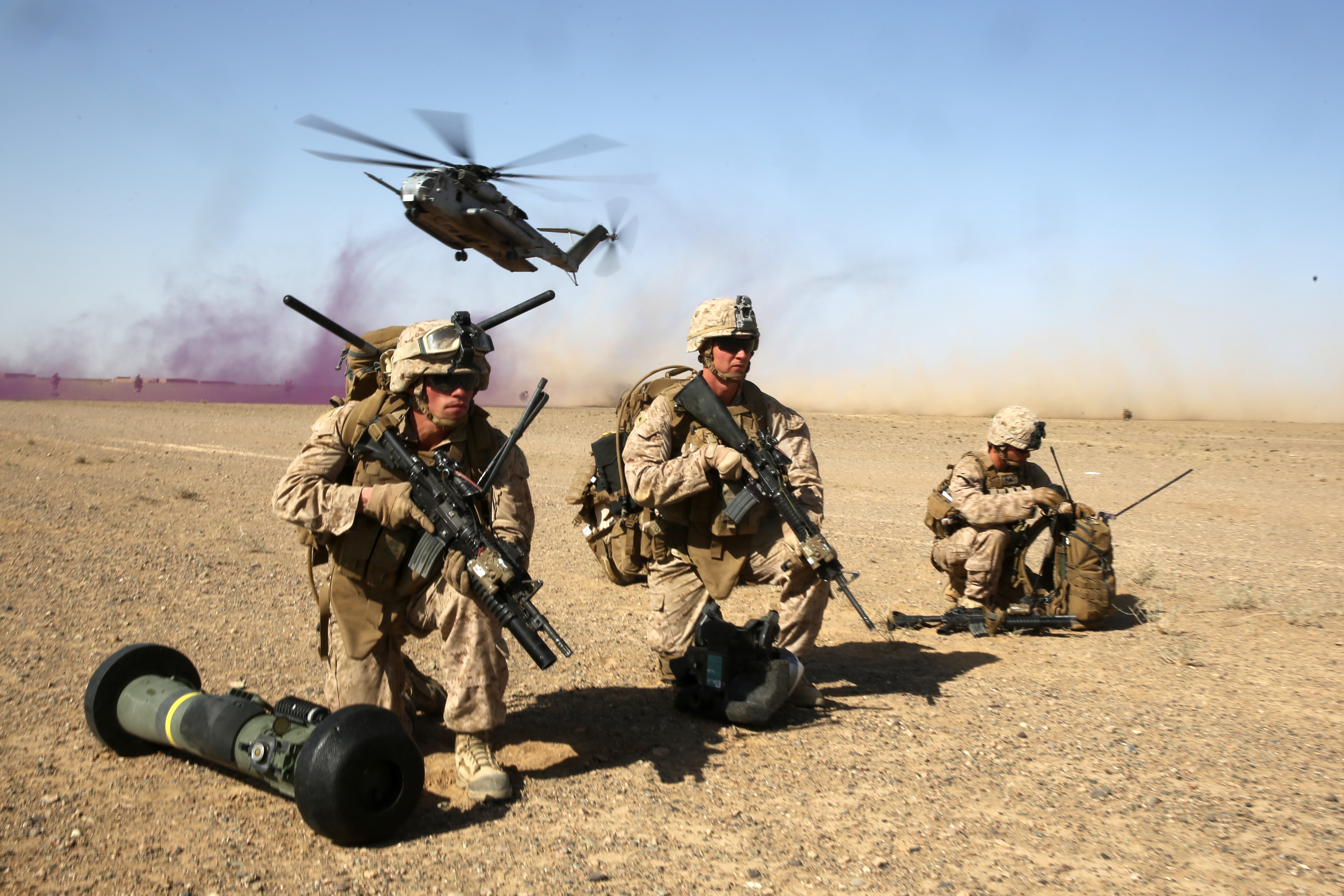
Marines land during a mission in Helmand province, Afghanistan, April 2014.

After the U.S. was attacked by terrorists on 11 September 2001, Marines and other U.S. forces began staging in Pakistan and Uzbekistan on the border of Afghanistan as early as October 2001 in preparation for Operation Enduring Freedom. The 15th and 26th Marine Expeditionary Units were some of the first conventional forces into Afghanistan in support of Operation Enduring Freedom in November 2001. Marines, led by Gen Mattis, moved into FOB after Army troops secured the area. Since then, Marine battalions and squadrons have been rotating through, engaging Taliban and Al-Qaeda forces. Marines of the 24th Marine Expeditionary Unit flooded into the Taliban-held town of Garmsir on 29 April 2008, in Helmand Province, in the first major American operation in the region in years. In June 2009, 7,000 Marines with the 2nd Marine Expeditionary Brigade deployed to Afghanistan in an effort to improve security, and began Operation Strike of the Sword the next month. Thus far, 449 Marines have been reported killed.

=== Iraq War ===
Most recently, the Marines have served prominently in the Iraq War as part of Operation Iraqi Freedom. The I Marine Expeditionary Force, along with the Army's 3rd Infantry Division, spearheaded the 2003 invasion of Iraq and received the Presidential Unit Citation, the first time a Marine unit has received that award since 1968. The Marines left Iraq in the fall of 2003, but returned for occupation duty in the beginning of 2004. They were given responsibility for the Al Anbar Province, the large desert region to the west of Baghdad. During this occupation, the Marines spearheaded both assaults on the city of Fallujah in April (Operation Vigilant Resolve) and November 2004 (Operation Phantom Fury) and also saw intense fighting in such places as Ramadi, Al-Qa'im and Hīt. Their time in Iraq has also courted controversy with the Haditha killings and the Hamdania incident. The Anbar Awakening and 2007 surge reduced levels of violence. On 1 March 2009, President Barack Obama announced an accelerated withdrawal during a speech at Camp Lejeune, promising all combat troops out by August 2010. The Marine Corps officially ended its role in Iraq on 23 January 2010 when they handed over responsibility for Al Anbar Province to the United States Army. 1,022 Marines were killed in the war with an additional 8,623 wounded, while only Cpl Jason Dunham received the Medal of Honor.

=== Domestic Operations ===
In 1992, President George H.W Bush invoked the Insurrection Act and deployed 1,500 Marines from the 3rd battalion, 1st Marine Division, 1st Light Armored Infantry Battalion (later redesignated the 1st Light Armored Reconnaissance Battalion) and 1st Combat Engineer Battalion to Los Angeles in response to violence & civil disorder during the 1992 Los Angeles Riots.

In 2025, President Donald Trump’s administration deployed 700 Marines with the 2nd Battalion, 7th Marines & 1st Marine Division from Marine Corps Air Ground Combat Center Base near Twentynine Palms, California within the United States to Los Angeles to seamlessly integrate with the Title 10 forces under Task Force 51 who are protecting federal personnel such as Immigrations Customs Enforcement personnel and federal property in the greater Los Angeles area after incidents of violence & civil disorder caused by protests against Immigrations Custom Enforcement (ICE) raids in Los Angeles.

== See also ==
- Culture of the United States Marine Corps
- List of films featuring the United States Marine Corps
- List of historically notable United States Marines
- Military history of the United States
- National Museum of the Marine Corps
- United States Marine Corps History Division
