= Richard Wickes =

Continental Navy officer (died 1776)

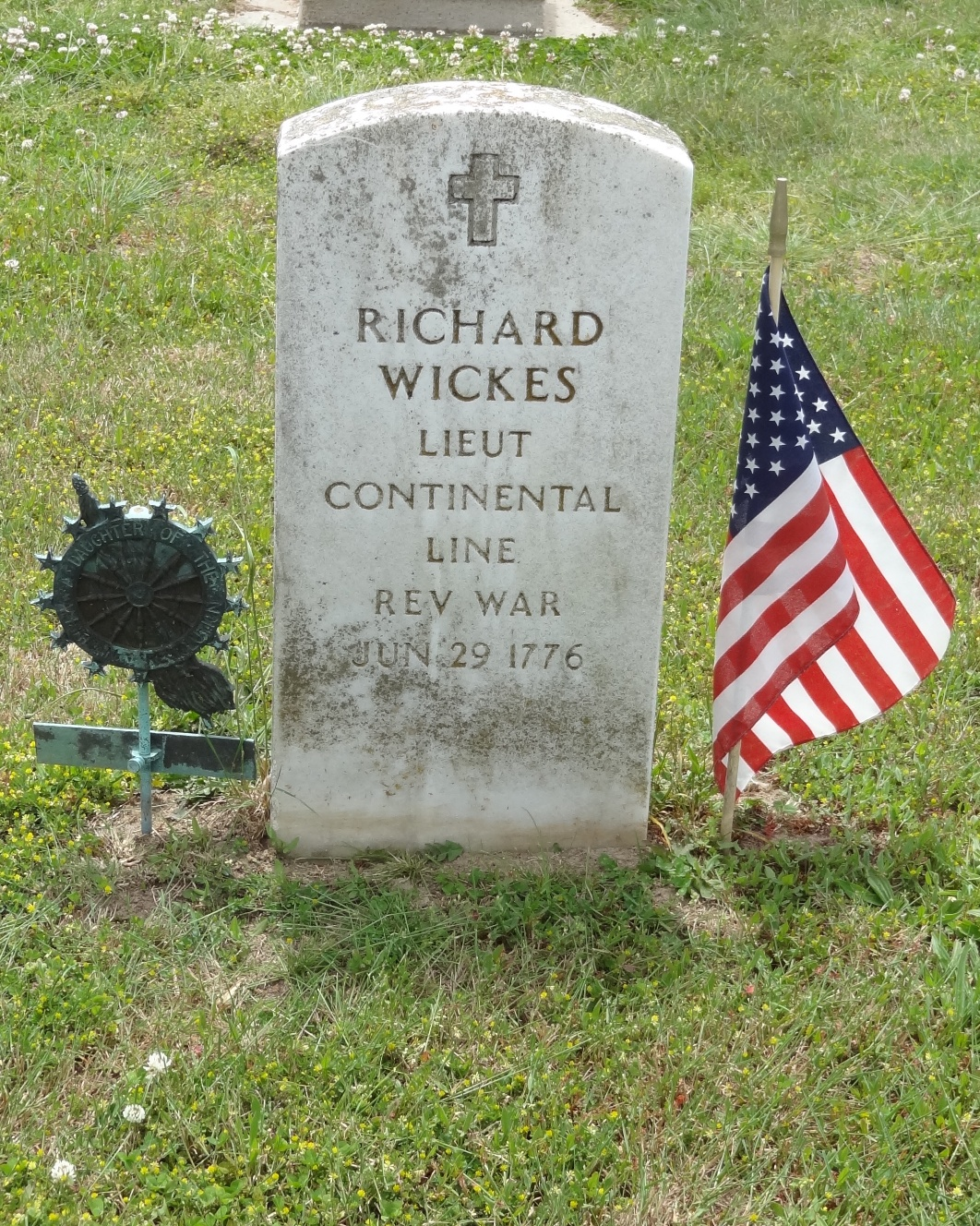
- Born: c. 1745; Kent County, Maryland, British America
- Died: 29 June 1776 (aged c. 31) Turtle Gut Inlet, off Wildwood Crest, Atlantic Ocean
- Buried: Cold Spring Presbyterian Cemetery; Cold Spring, New Jersey
- Allegiance: United States
- Branch: Continental Navy
- Service years: 1776
- Rank: Lieutenant
- Conflicts: American Revolutionary War; Battle of Turtle Gut Inlet †

Richard Wickes (c. 1745 - June 29, 1776) was an officer in the Continental Navy during the American Revolutionary War. He served as the third lieutenant on the Reprisal, captained by his brother Lambert Wickes. During the Battle of Turtle Gut Inlet, he was the first American casualty of the war in New Jersey.

Richard Wickes was born in Kent County, Maryland. His family home, Wickliffe, was on Eastern Neck Island.

== American Revolutionary War ==
Richard Wickes received his commission early in the war, as did his brother Lambert. On March 28, 1776, they both began service on the newly commissioned 18-gun Reprisal. On June 10, the Committee of Secret Correspondence of Congress ordered Captain Wickes to set sail from Philadelphia, Pennsylvania and proceed to Martinique. On June 28, near Cape May, New Jersey, they joined forces with Captain John Barry on the Lexington to come to the aid of the privateer Nancy being chased by two British Navy ships, the 32-gun HMS Orpheus and the 16-gun HMS Kingfisher. Nancy was headed to Philadelphia with supplies loaded in the Caribbean islands of St. Thomas and St. Croix. The cargo contained several hundred kegs of gunpowder.

Late on the afternoon of June 28, Captain Wickes ordered his brother Richard to lead an armed longboat to the Nancy and tell her captain, Hugh Montgomery, to head for the shore. Lieutenant Wickes reached the Nancy soon after midnight. In the early hours of June 29, pursued by the British Orpheus and Kingfisher, the Nancy headed for the nearby Turtle Gut Inlet to run aground and salvage the cargo. Lieutenant Wickes assisted in operations to return cannon fire and transfer the cargo ashore. By late in the morning of June 29, the British bombardment had heavily damaged the Nancy. Barry ordered the main sail wrapped around 50 pounds of gunpowder to create a long fuse running from the nearly 100 gunpowder kegs remaining in the hold to the deck and over the side. The fuse was lit as the crew abandoned ship. As the British boarded the ship, the fuse reached the hold. The gunpowder exploded with a huge blast felt for miles which killed seven members of the boarding party.

After the explosion, Lieutenant Wickes was killed by subsequent British cannon fire. He was the only American casualty. Captain Wickes, in a letter to his brother Samuel, described how he had seen his brother die in the final four or five minutes of the battle. He was recognized for his bravery by both his brother and Captain Barry, who said that "a braver man never lived."

== Legacy ==
Lieutenant Richard Wickes is buried at the Cold Spring Presbyterian Cemetery. A section of the cemetery, Veterans Field of Honor, is dedicated to his service "in the cause of American freedom." There is a second memorial marker in Cape May, New Jersey.

== Gallery ==
Cold Spring Presbyterian Cemetery

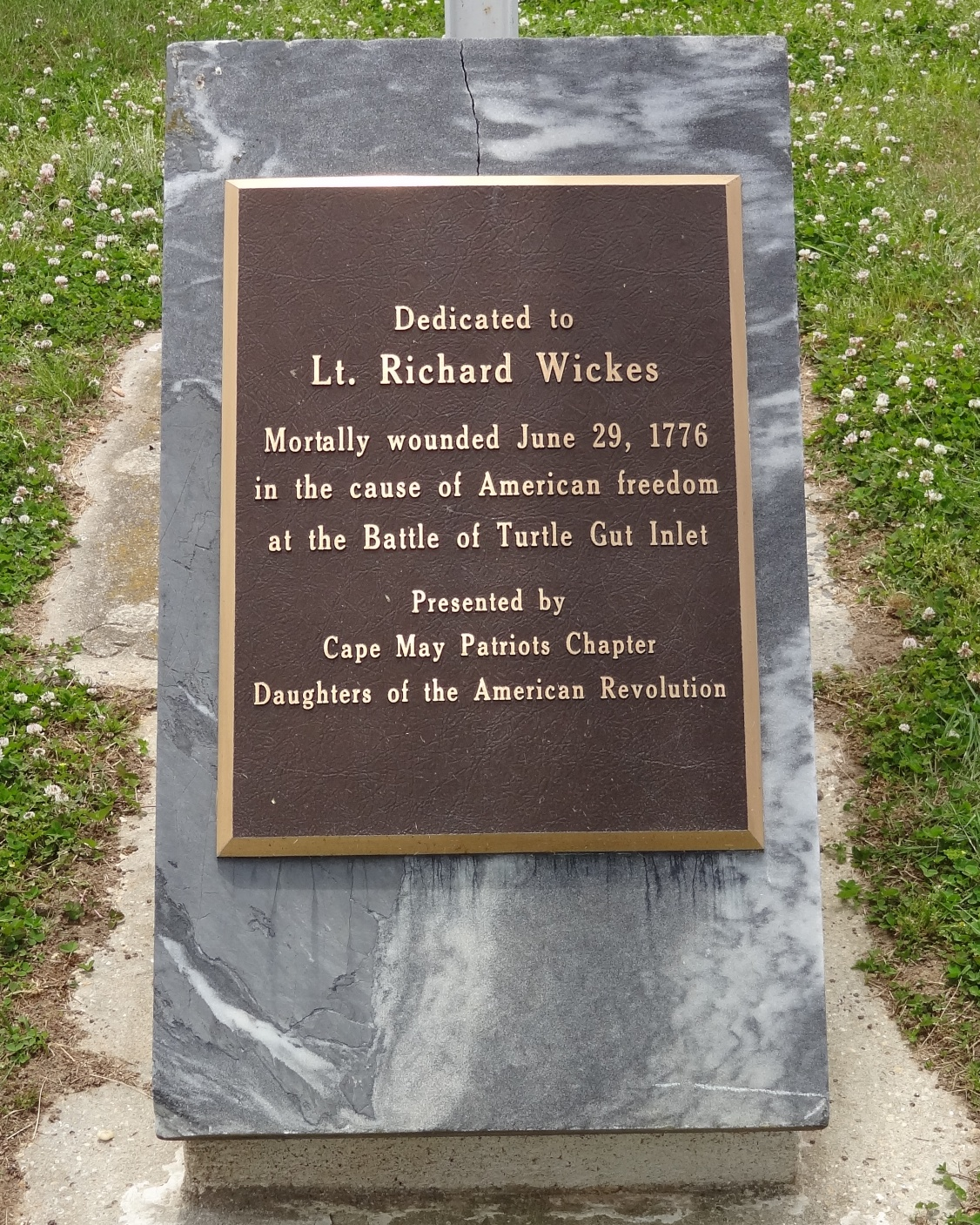
Lieutenant Richard Wickes memorial

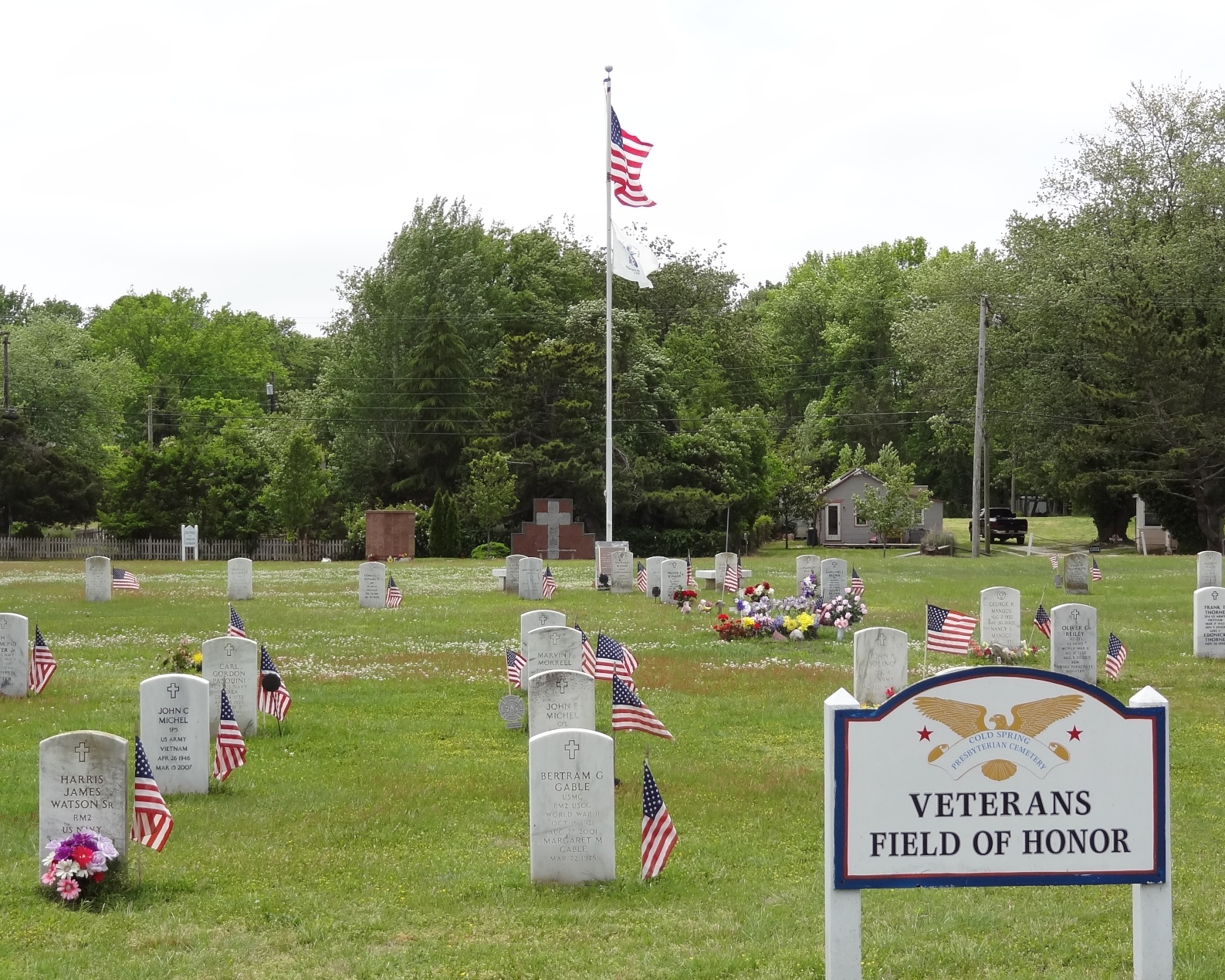
Veterans Field of Honor

Cape May

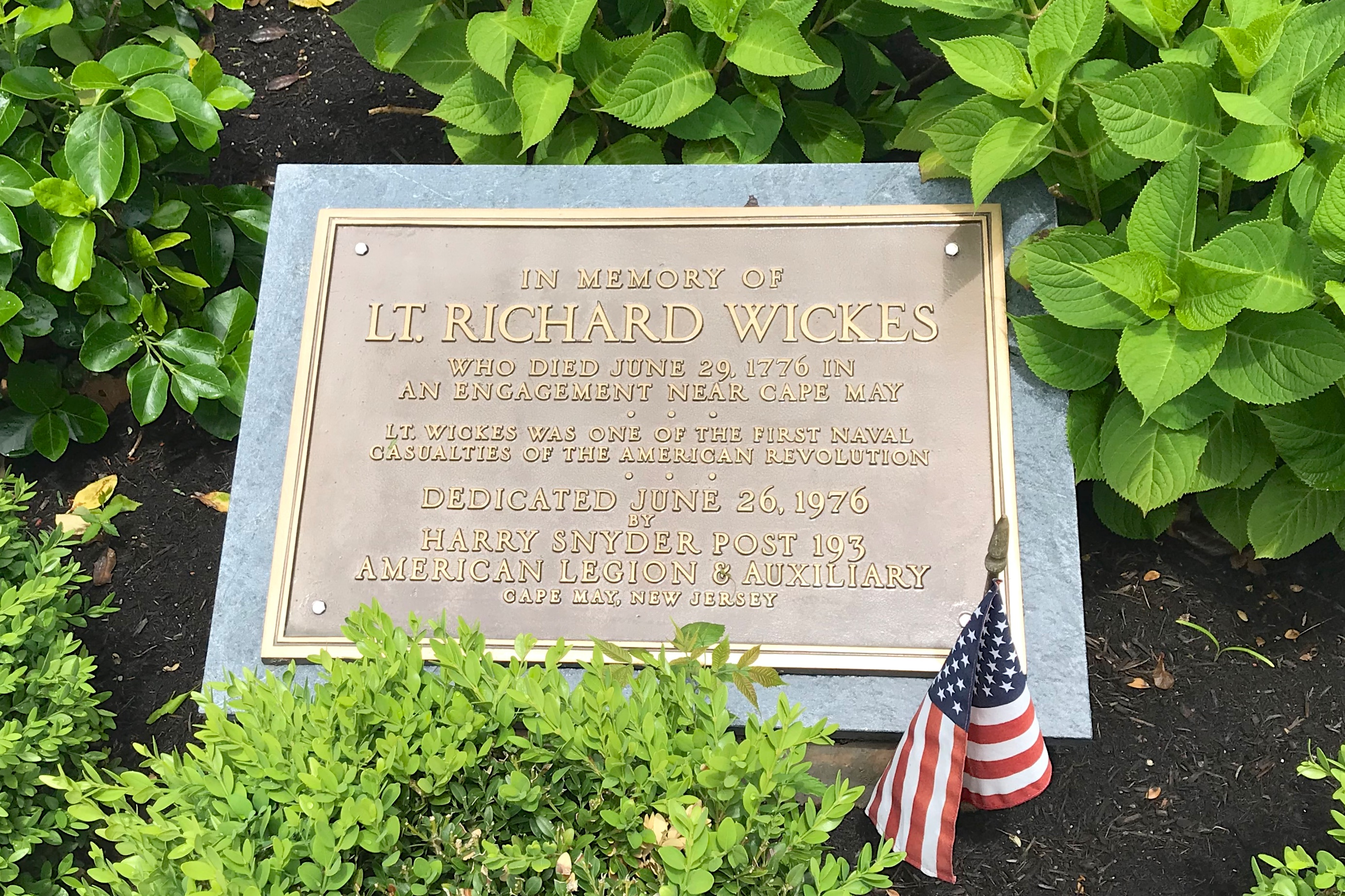
Lieutenant Richard Wickes memorial

== Bibliography ==
- Clark, William Bell (1932). Lambert Wickes, Sea Raider and Diplomat: The Story of a Naval Captain of the Revolution. Yale University Press.
- Clark, William Bell (1938). Gallant John Barry, 1745–1803: The Story of a Naval Hero of Two Wars. New York: The Macmillan Company.
- Johnson, Robert Amandus (2006). Saint Croix 1770–1776: The First Salute to the Stars and Stripes. ISBN 978-1-4259-7008-6.
- Morgan, William James, ed. (1970). Naval Documents of The American Revolution, American Theatre: May 9, 1776 – July 31, 1776 (PDF). Vol. 5. Washington, D.C.: Naval History Division/Naval Historical Center, Department of the Navy.
