= Hugh Montgomery (sea captain) =

American sea captain

Captain Hugh Montgomery
- Born: unknown date
- Died: 1780; Wilmington, Delaware
- Resting place: Holy Trinity Church (Old Swedes)
- Known for: Raising the first American flag in a foreign port; Battle of Turtle Gut Inlet

Hugh Montgomery was an American sea captain during the American Revolutionary War. He was commander of the brig Nancy, chartered to transport military supplies for the Americans. While loading cargo in the Caribbean, he learned that independence had been declared and raised the first American flag in a foreign port, according to his daughter. Returning to Philadelphia, he prevented the seizure of the cargo of gunpowder by British blockaders at the Battle of Turtle Gut Inlet on June 29, 1776. He was later captured by the British and died in 1780 returning from New Providence after his release.

== Career ==
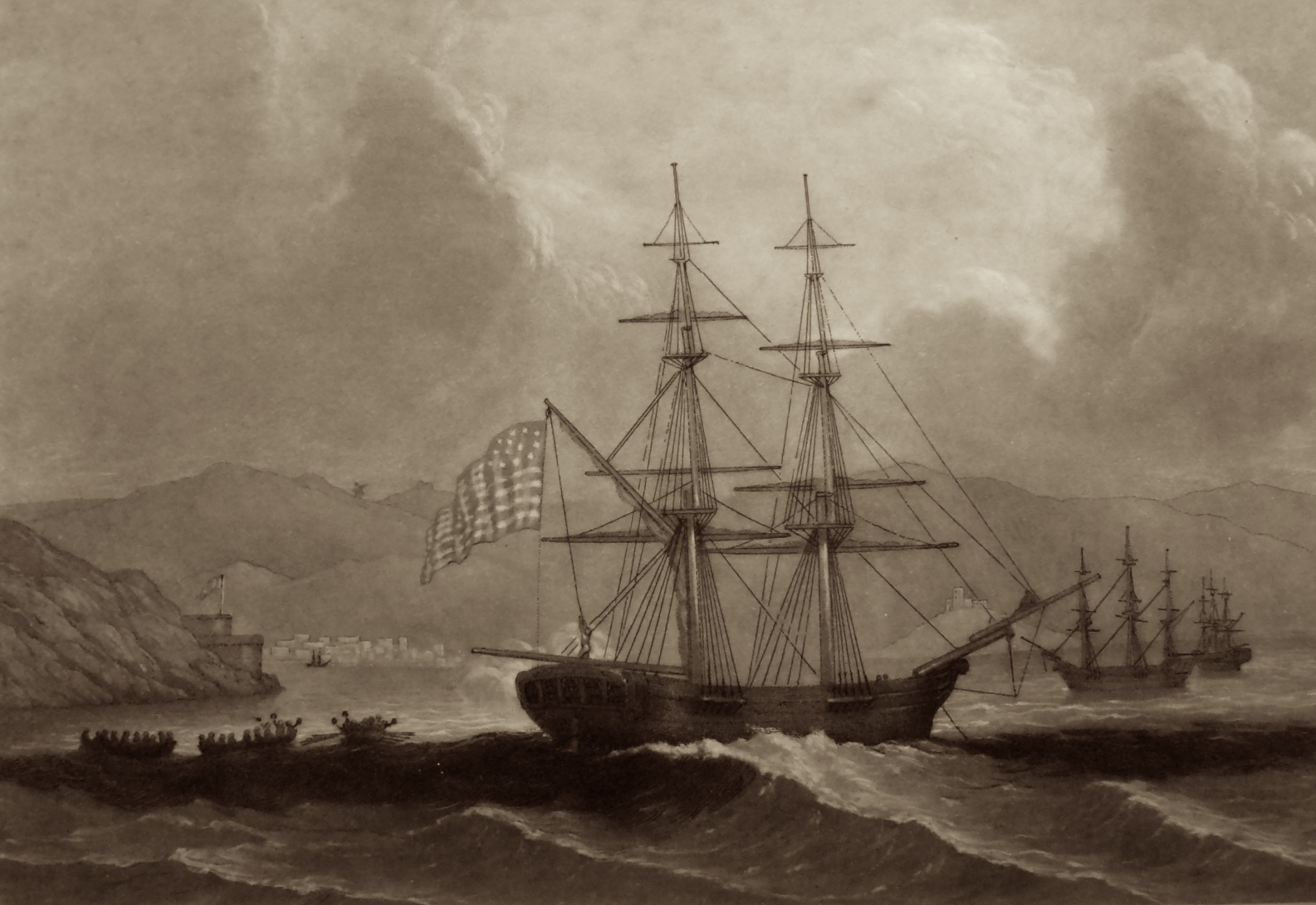
Nancy flying an American flag at St. Thomas. Captain Hugh Montgomery. Engraving by John Sartain

=== Military charter ===
On March 1, 1776, Robert Morris of the Pennsylvania Committee of Safety chartered the newly built Nancy and Captain Hugh Montgomery to transport gunpowder and arms for the revolution. Later in March, Captain Montgomery sailed to Puerto Rico to purchase arms and ammunition. In early June, the crew loaded additional supplies in the Caribbean islands of St. Thomas and St. Croix.

=== First American flag in a foreign port ===
While at St. Thomas, Captain Montgomery received news that independence had been declared. An American flag was created by ensign Thomas Mendenhall and flown to replace the British one. That is, according to Elizabeth Montgomery, the captain's daughter, and Thomas C. Mendenhall, by family tradition. Her book includes a mezzotint engraving by John Sartain that shows Nancy flying an American flag with a circle of ten stars surrounding three central stars.

=== Turtle Gut Inlet ===
Late in the afternoon of June 28, HMS Kingfisher spotted Nancy sailing toward Cape May, and gave chase, followed by HMS Orpheus. Captain John Barry on Lexington ordered longboats, led by Lieutenant Richard Wickes, to set out to assist Nancy.

In the early hours of June 29, pursued by the British Orpheus and Kingfisher and blocked from entering the Delaware Bay, Captain Montgomery sailed Nancy for nearby Turtle Gut Inlet in a heavy fog. She soon ran aground at the inlet, while the larger British ships kept to deeper waters.

Although still out of range but sailing closer, the British shelled Nancy, while the Americans attempted to salvage the cargo, especially the gunpowder kegs. Barry organized the crews into two operations. One group returned cannon fire to keep the British from boarding. The other transferred the cargo onto longboats and rowed to shore, where local residents helped unload and secure it behind the dunes.

By late morning on June 29, they had removed 265 to 286 kegs of gunpowder, but the British bombardment had heavily damaged Nancy. Barry ordered the main sail to be wrapped around 50 pounds of gunpowder to create a long fuse running from the nearly 100 gunpowder kegs remaining in the hold to the deck and over the side. The fuse was lit as the crew abandoned ship, while one last sailor climbed the mast to remove the American flag. The British thought the lowering of the flag was a sign of surrender and quickly boarded Nancy. By then the fuse had reached the hold. The gunpowder exploded with a huge blast felt for miles, which killed many British. Captain Alexander Graeme reported the loss of his master's mate and six men on longboats from the Kingfisher.

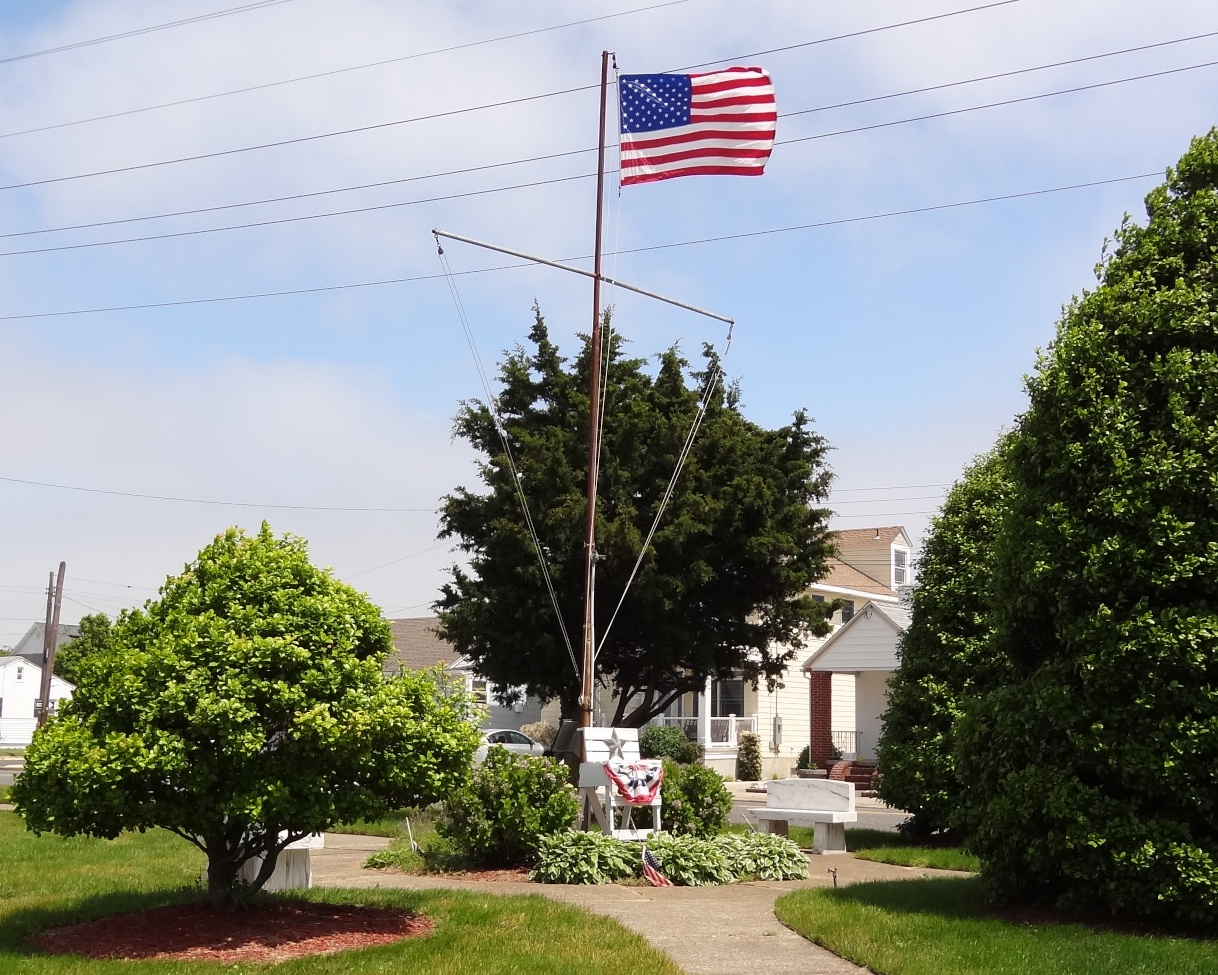
The Battle of Turtle Gut Inlet memorial in Wildwood Crest to the seamen and officers of the Brigantine Nancy

=== Aftermath ===
The British later captured him and held him in prison for some time. After his release in 1780, while returning from New Providence, "his mind became disordered" and "he leaped overboard in a fit [of] insanity, and was drowned".

For many years, his daughter sought compensation from the Committee on Revolutionary Claims for his losses during the battle. Congress provided for a payment of $5,000, if funds were available, in 1858.

== Bibliography ==
- Donnelly, Mark P.; Diehl, Daniel (2010). "The Battle of Turtle Gut Inlet". Pirates of New Jersey. Mechanicsburg, PA: Stackpole Books. ISBN 9780811706674.
- Dorwart, Jeffery M. (1992). Cape May County, New Jersey: The Making of an American Resort Community. New Brunswick, NJ: Rutgers University Press. ISBN 0-8135-1784-2.
- Johnson, Robert Amandus (2006). Saint Croix 1770–1776: The First Salute to the Stars and Stripes. ISBN 978-1-4259-7008-6.
- Montgomery, Elizabeth (1851). Reminiscences of Wilmington, in Familiar Village Tales, Ancient and New. T.K. Collins, Jr.
- Morgan, William James, ed. (1970). Naval Documents of The American Revolution, American Theatre: May 9, 1776 – July 31, 1776 (PDF). Vol. 5. Washington, D.C.: Naval History Division/Naval Historical Center, Department of the Navy.
- Preble, George Henry (1872). Our Flag. Origin and Progress of the flag of the United States of America. Albany, NY: Joel Munsell.
