= Lambert Wickes =

Continental Navy officer (1735–1777)

- Born: 1735; Kent County, Maryland, British America
- Died: October 1, 1777 (aged 41–42)
- Military career
- Allegiance: United States
- Branch: Continental Navy
- Service years: 1776–1777
- Rank: Captain (U.S.)
- Commands: Reprisal
- Conflicts: American Revolutionary War; Battle of Turtle Gut Inlet

Lambert Wickes (1735 – October 1, 1777) was a captain in the Continental Navy during the American Revolutionary War.

== Revolutionary activities ==
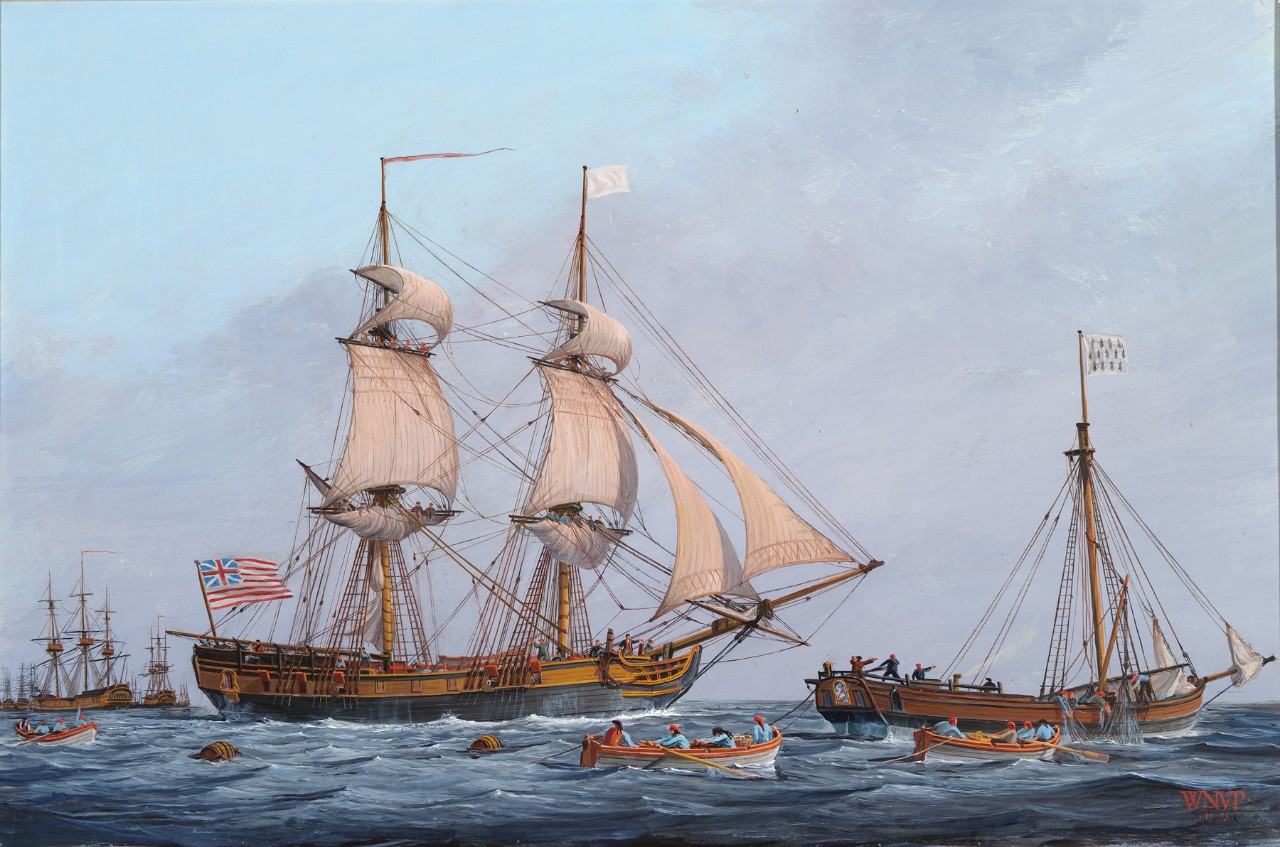
Reprisal, Wickes' last command

Wickes was born sometime in 1735 in Kent County, Province of Maryland. His family home, Wickliffe, was on Eastern Neck Island. Prior to the American Revolution, Wickes was captain of the merchant ships the Neptune and the Ceres. On March 28, 1776 the Continental Congress allowed the purchase of the 18-gun brig which would be renamed the Reprisal. In May of the same year, Wickes was the Reprisal's captain and he was ordered to sail into battle against the British frigate Roebuck which was opening the Delaware River to British ships. Wickes would later be designated as number 11 on the Continental Navy's seniority list.

The Committee of Secret Correspondence of Congress, by arrangement with the Marine Committee, issued orders for Capt. Wickes to proceed to the West Indies in Reprisal and bring out munitions for use by General Washington's army. In addition, Wickes was to transport William Bingham to his post, the French possession of Martinique, as agent for the American colonies.

Reprisal passed down the Delaware River from Philadelphia during the latter part of June 1776. While en route, Reprisal went to the aid of the harried Continental 6-gun brig Nancy — bound from St. Croix and St. Thomas with 386 barrels of gunpowder — which was being chased by six British men-of-war. In order to save Nancy, her captain, Hugh Montgomery, ran her aground. Reprisal and Lexington – the latter under the command of Capt. John Barry – kept boats from HMS Kingfisher at bay and succeeded in landing some 200 barrels of the precious powder. In this engagement, Wickes' brother, Richard Wickes, was killed while serving as third lieutenant in Reprisal. This engagement became known as the Battle of Turtle Gut Inlet.

Clearing the Delaware capes on July 3, Reprisal, under Wickes' sterling seamanship, captured a number of prizes in the West Indies and had a sharp engagement with HMS Shark, beating her off and escaping into port.

On October 24, 1776, Wickes was ordered to France with Benjamin Franklin and his two grandsons as passengers. On November 27, while approaching the coast of France, Captain Wickes received Ambassador Franklin's permission to engage two brigs, and captured them both: the brigantines George and La Vigne. On November 29, still some distance from Nantes, Wickes had to drop anchor because of unfavorable winds. Four days later Wickes hailed a fishing boat, which took Franklin and his grandsons ashore at the village of Auray. Setting sail in January 1777, Wickes took Reprisal to sea on a cruise which took her to the Bay of Biscay and the mouth of the English Channel. On February 5, his ship captured the armed packet-boat Swallow, carrying mail between Britain and its ally Portugal, after a hard action of 40 minutes duration. During the battle, Reprisal suffered two officers seriously wounded and one man killed.

During the remainder of this foray against British shipping, Wickes took five additional prizes and left them at Port Louis. Wickes moved Reprisal to Lorient, but was ordered to leave the port in 24 hours by the French government—the port authorities apparently stirred to action by remonstrances from British diplomats. Wickes, however, claimed that Reprisal had sprung a leak and needed to be careened for hull repairs. Wickes proved to be skillful at gaining time; as, on several occasions, he thwarted the intentions of the French government to have him sail.

In April 1777, the Continental vessels Lexington and Dolphin joined Reprisal and constituted a squadron under Wickes' command. Setting sail from St. Auzeau on May 28, the ships cruised around Ireland in June, July, and August; during one phase of the voyage, the three ships captured 15 ships in five days. On September 14, Wickes left France in Reprisal, in company with Dolphin, bound for home. The ships encountered a Nor'easter near the Grand Banks around October 1, and Reprisal foundered with the loss of all hands except the cook.

== Legacy ==
Louis H. Bolander, the assistant librarian at the Naval Academy, wrote an article on Wickes in 1928, entitled "A Forgotten Hero of the American Revolution." Appearing in Americana, in April 1928, the article closed with a fitting epitaph for Capt. Lambert Wickes: "Thus closed a career distinguished for patriotism, gallantry and humanity, for not a single charge of cruelty or harshness was ever breathed against him by any one of his many prisoners. Franklin, who knew him well, said of him, 'He was a gallant officer, and a very worthy man.' "

Two ships in the United States Navy have been named in his honor.

The two iron balls on each side of a magnetic compass, used to balance out and counteract magnetic variations based on a ship's location, are traditionally called "Lamberts", in his honor.
