= Battle of Turtle Gut Inlet =

First privateer battle of the American Revolutionary War

- Part of the American Revolutionary War
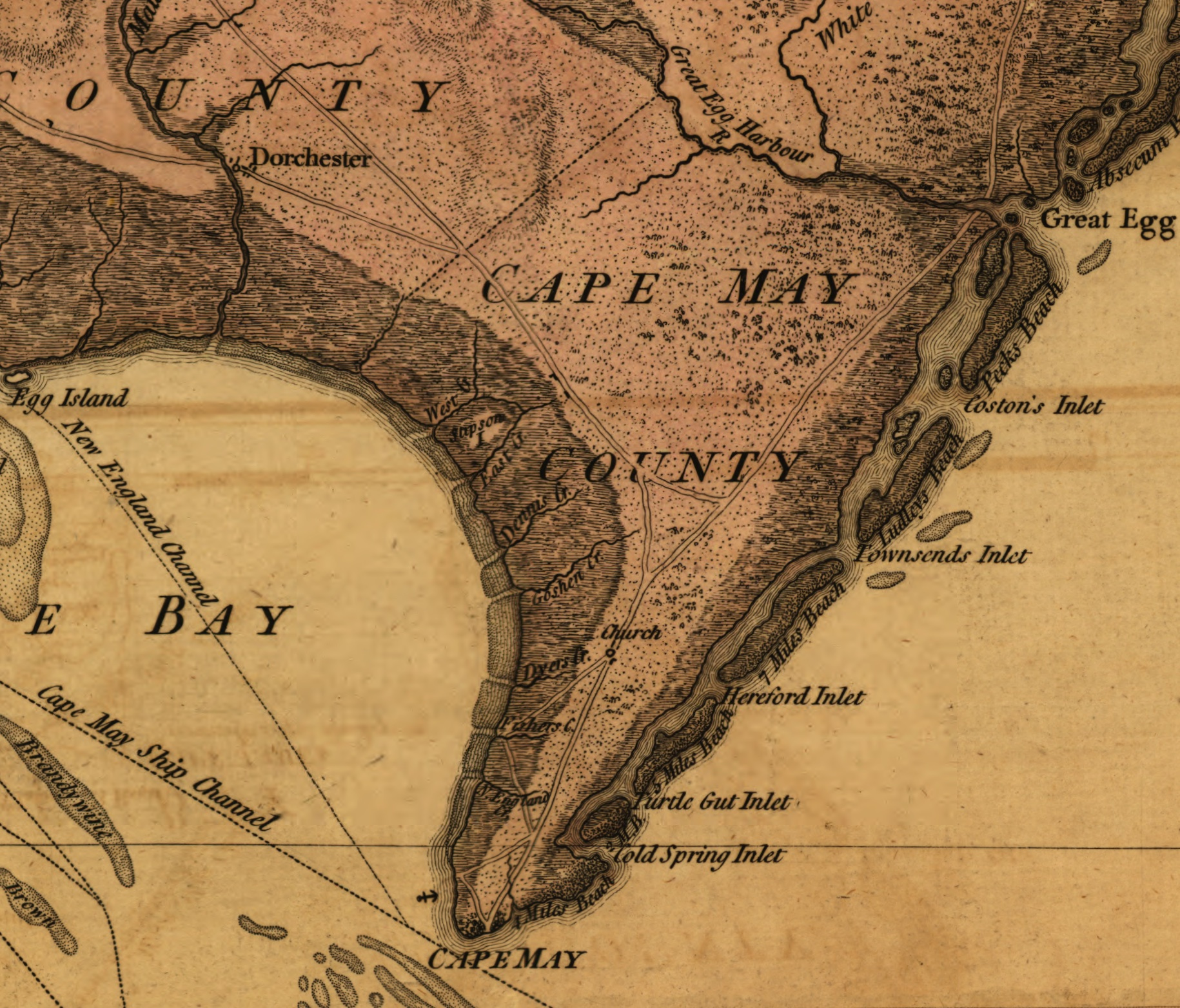
- Location of Turtle Gut Inlet on 1777 map
Date	June 29, 1776
Location	Turtle Gut Inlet, off Wildwood Crest near Cape May, New Jersey 38°58′11″N 74°50′42″W
Result	American victory

Belligerents
Great Britain	(United States) United Colonies

Commanders and leaders
Charles Hudson; Alexander Graeme	John Barry; Lambert Wickes; William Hallock; Hugh Montgomery

Strength
HMS Orpheus; HMS Kingfisher	USS Lexington; USS Reprisal; USS Wasp; Nancy

Casualties and losses
Estimated 12–36	Nancy destroyed Richard Wickes †

The Battle of Turtle Gut Inlet (June 29, 1776) was an important, early naval victory for the Continental Navy and the future "Father of the American Navy", Captain John Barry. It was the first privateer battle of the American Revolutionary War.

The battle resulted in the first American casualty of the war in New Jersey, Lieutenant Richard Wickes, brother of Captain Lambert Wickes.

It was the only Revolutionary War battle fought in Cape May County.

== Background ==
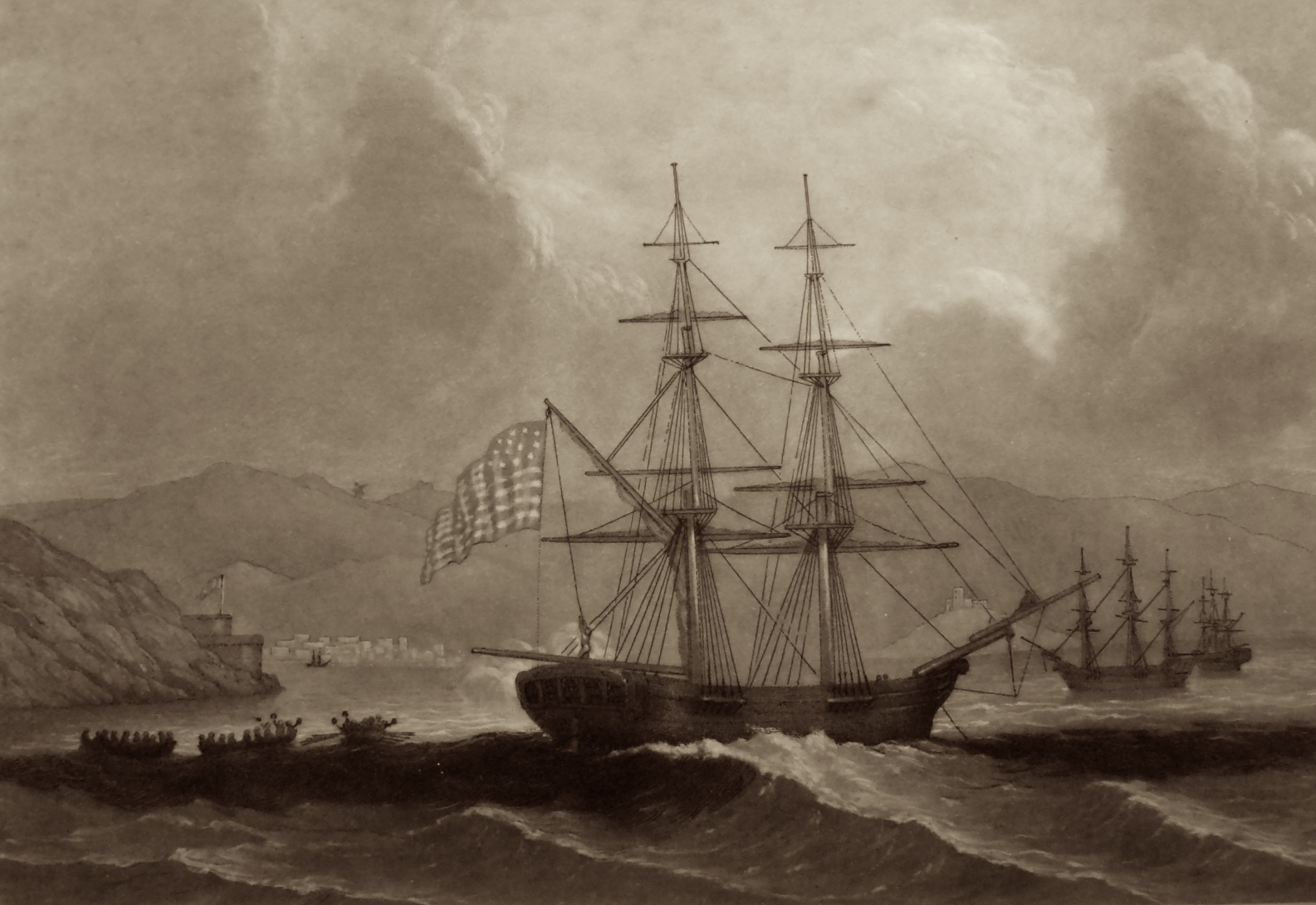
Brigantine Nancy at St. Thomas, engraving by John Sartain

To prevent the Americans from receiving supplies through the port of Philadelphia, the Royal Navy established a blockade of the Delaware Bay. This fleet included over 240 cannons. The Americans then fortified the river with cheveaux-de-frise in the shipping channel. To transport gunpowder and arms, Robert Morris of the Pennsylvania Committee of Safety chartered the newly built brig, also called brigantine, Nancy and her captain, Hugh Montgomery on March 1, 1776. On March 14, 1776, John Barry was commissioned captain of the fourteen-gun Lexington in the Continental Navy.

In early June, the privateer Nancy loaded supplies in the Caribbean islands of St. Thomas and St. Croix. She then sailed for Philadelphia with "three hundred and eighty-six barrels of gunpowder, fifty fire-locks, one hundred and one hogsheads of rum, and sixty-two hogsheads of sugar, &c, on board". In mid-June, Barry was alerted by Morris that Nancy was headed his way, and would need protection since she had only an eleven-man crew and six cannons. Barry was soon joined by the eighteen-gun Reprisal, captained by Lambert Wickes, and the eight-gun Wasp, captained by William Hallock, and headed for Cape May.

The British blockade squadron was led by the 28-gun HMS Liverpool, captained by Henry Bellew, and included the 32-gun HMS Orpheus, captained by Charles Hudson, and the sixteen-gun HMS Kingfisher, captained by Alexander Graeme. Also at this time, the vanguard of the British fleet of over one hundred ships was set to enter New York Harbor on the morning of June 29.

== Battle ==
Late on the afternoon of June 28, a lookout on Kingfisher spotted Nancy sailing toward Cape May and began chase, followed by Orpheus. Nancy, and the pursuing British ships, were spotted by the American lookout at Cape May. Captain Barry, on Lexington, received a message by flag code from Nancy that she needed help. Barry in turn signaled Reprisal and Wasp and then met with their captains to plan a response. Longboats from Lexington, Wasp, and Reprisal, led by Lieutenant Richard Wickes, set out to assist Nancy.

In the early hours of June 29, pursued by Orpheus and Kingfisher and blocked from entering the Delaware Bay, Nancy headed for the nearby Turtle Gut Inlet in a heavy fog. She soon ran aground, while the larger British ships were forced to stay in deeper waters. Although still out of range but sailing closer, the British fired at Nancy, while the Americans attempted to salvage the cargo, especially the gunpowder kegs. Barry organized the crews into two operations. One group returned cannon fire to keep the British from boarding. The other transferred the cargo onto longboats and rowed to shore where local residents helped unload and secure it behind the dunes.

By late in the morning of June 29, 265 to 286 kegs of gunpowder had been removed, and the British bombardment had heavily damaged Nancy. Barry ordered the main sail wrapped around fifty pounds of gunpowder to create a long fuse running from the nearly 100 gunpowder kegs remaining in the hold to the deck and over the side. The fuse was lit as the crew abandoned ship, while one last sailor climbed the mast to remove the American flag. The British thought the lowering of the flag was a sign of surrender and sent a boarding party to take possession of Nancy. By then the fuse had reached the hold. The gunpowder exploded with a huge blast felt for miles which killed seven members of the boarding party. Captain Graeme reported the loss of his master's mate and six men on longboats from Kingfisher. American Lieutenant Richard Wickes, brother of Captain Lambert Wickes of Reprisal, was killed by British cannon fire near the end of the battle.

== Aftermath ==
The battle demonstrated the resourcefulness of the American forces to the British. As a result, the British Navy moved their blockade of Philadelphia further away from the Cape May area. Barry's role in salvaging most of the gunpowder cargo under the fire of the two Royal Navy ships was quickly noted, an important step in his career. Following the battle, Captain Wickes on Reprisal, continued with his mission to the West Indies.

Lieutenant Richard Wickes is buried at the Cold Spring Presbyterian Church cemetery. A section of the cemetery, Veterans Field of Honor, is dedicated to his memory. The Seal of Wildwood Crest and the Seal of the Wildwood Crest Historical Society each contain a drawing of the brigantine Nancy in honor of the battle. In 1922, Cape May County filled in Turtle Gut Inlet. The site is now remembered by a small park.

== Gallery ==
Wildwood Crest

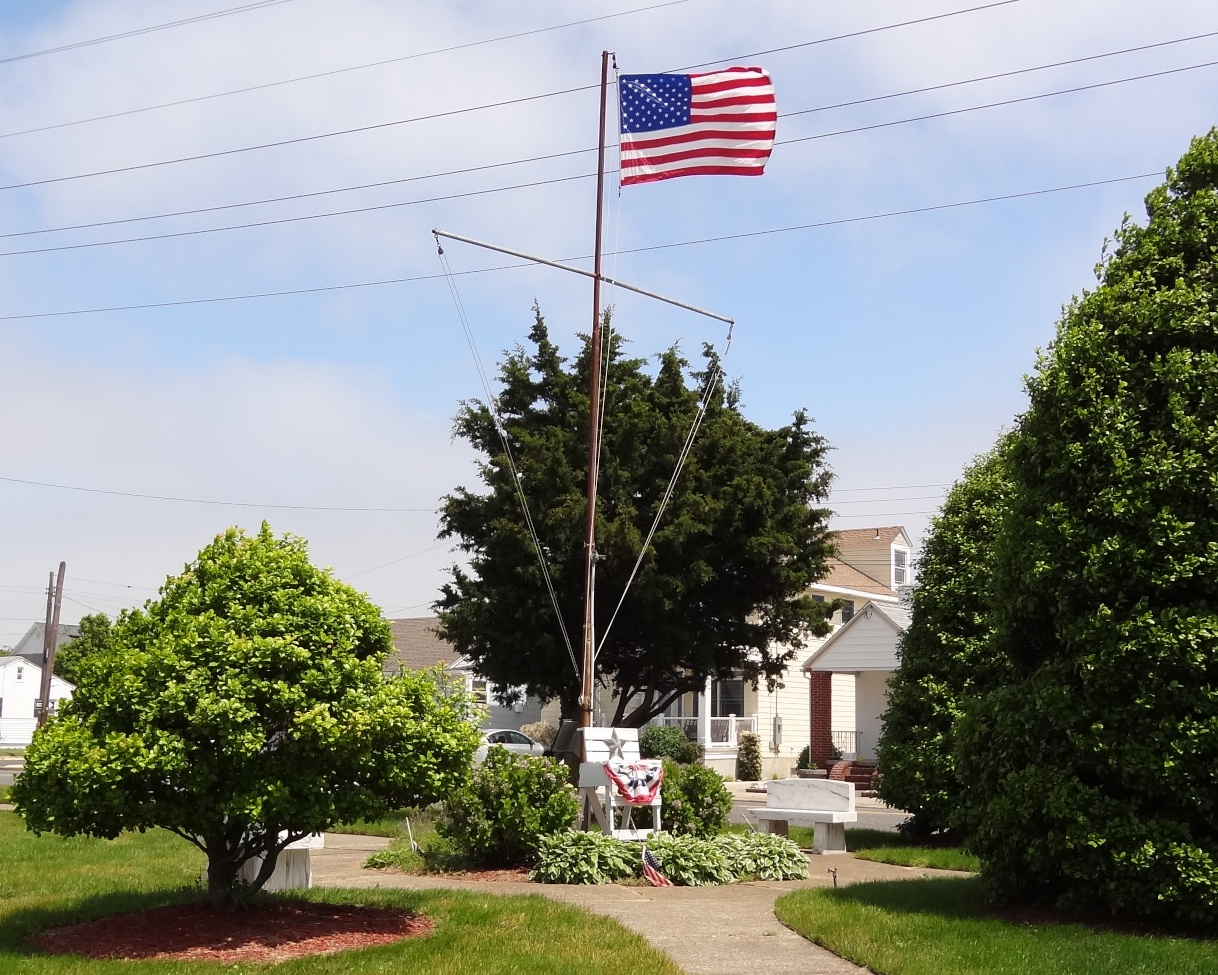
Battle of Turtle Gut Inlet memorial park

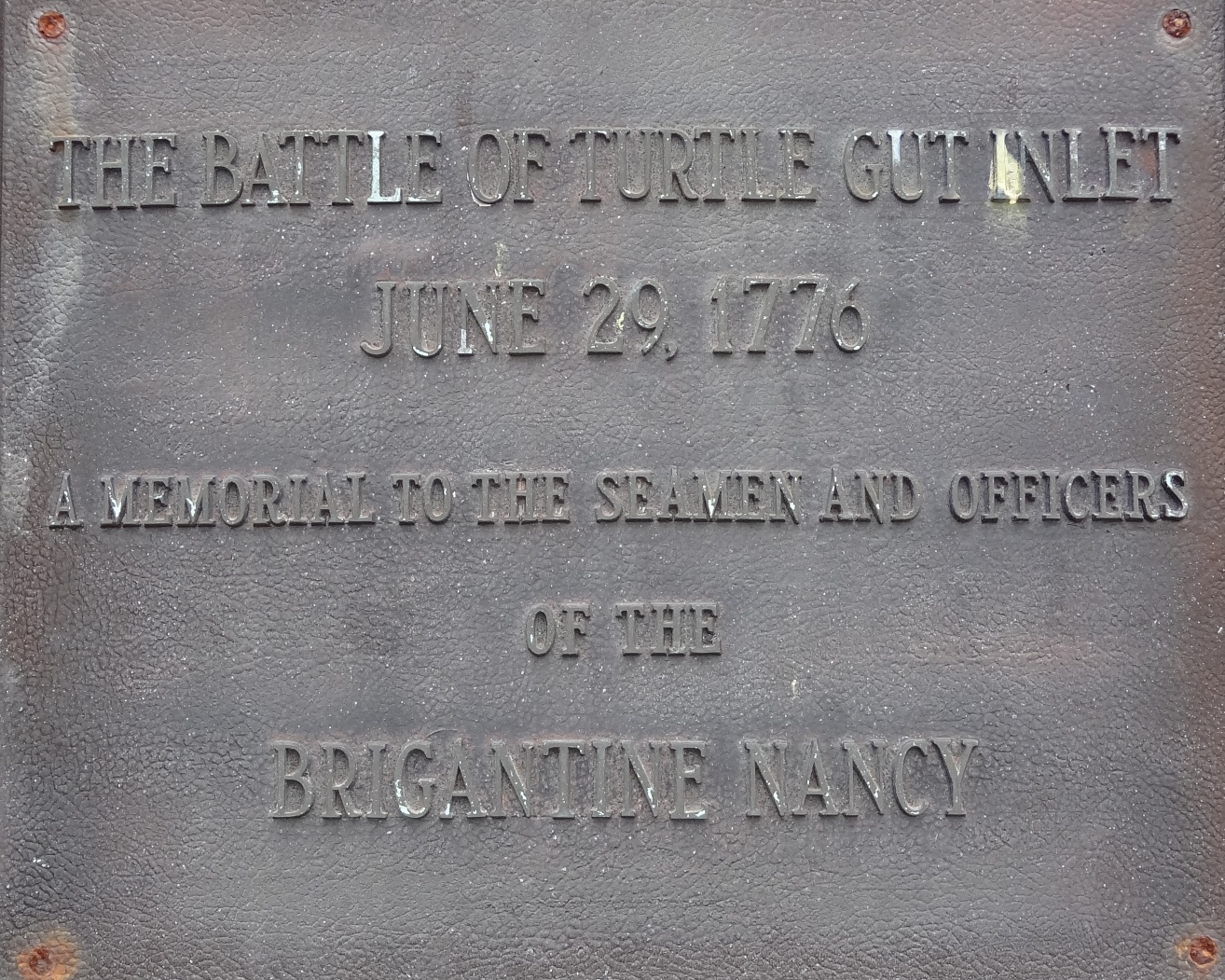
Battle of Turtle Gut Inlet plaque

Cold Spring Presbyterian Church cemetery

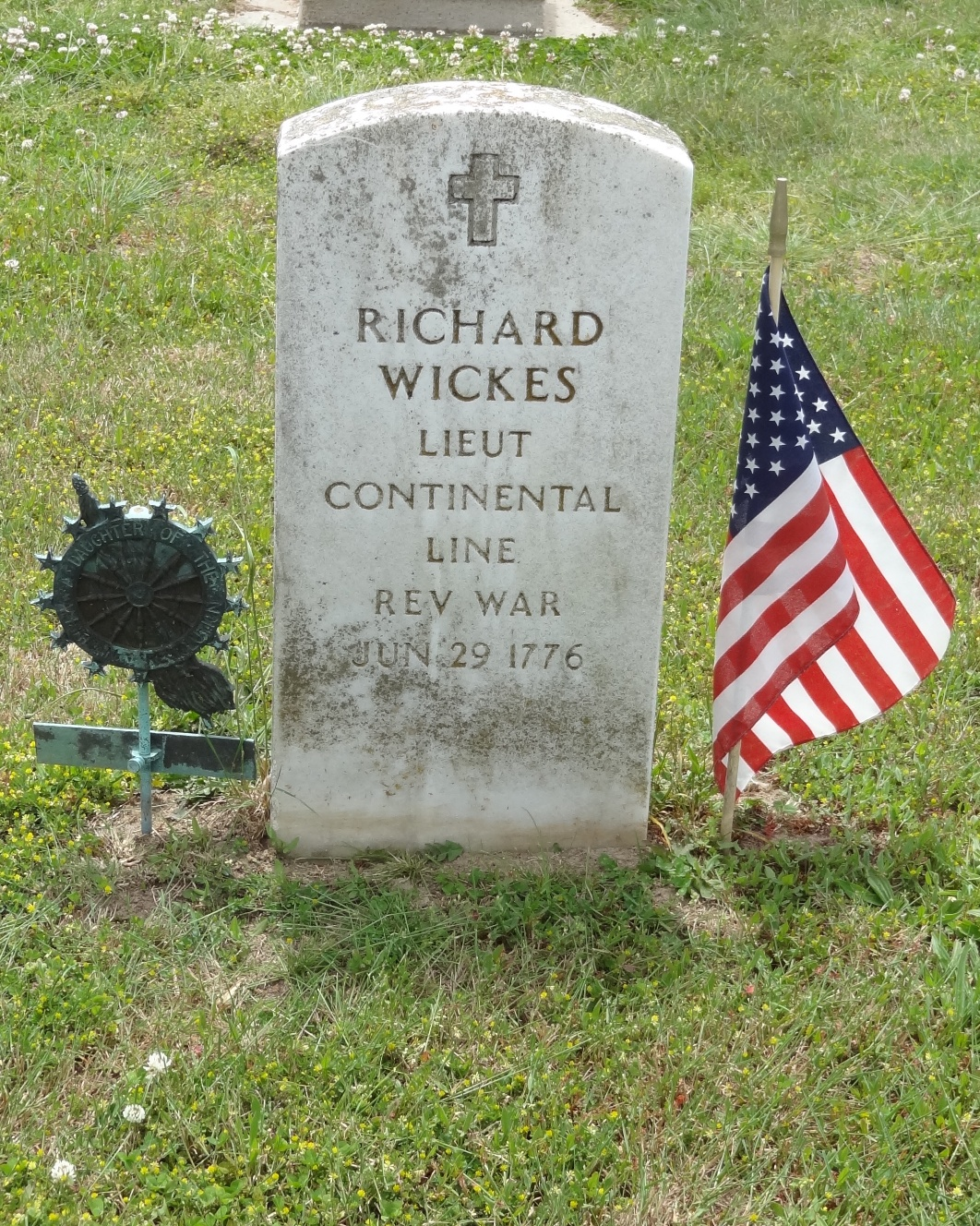
Lieutenant Richard Wickes gravestone

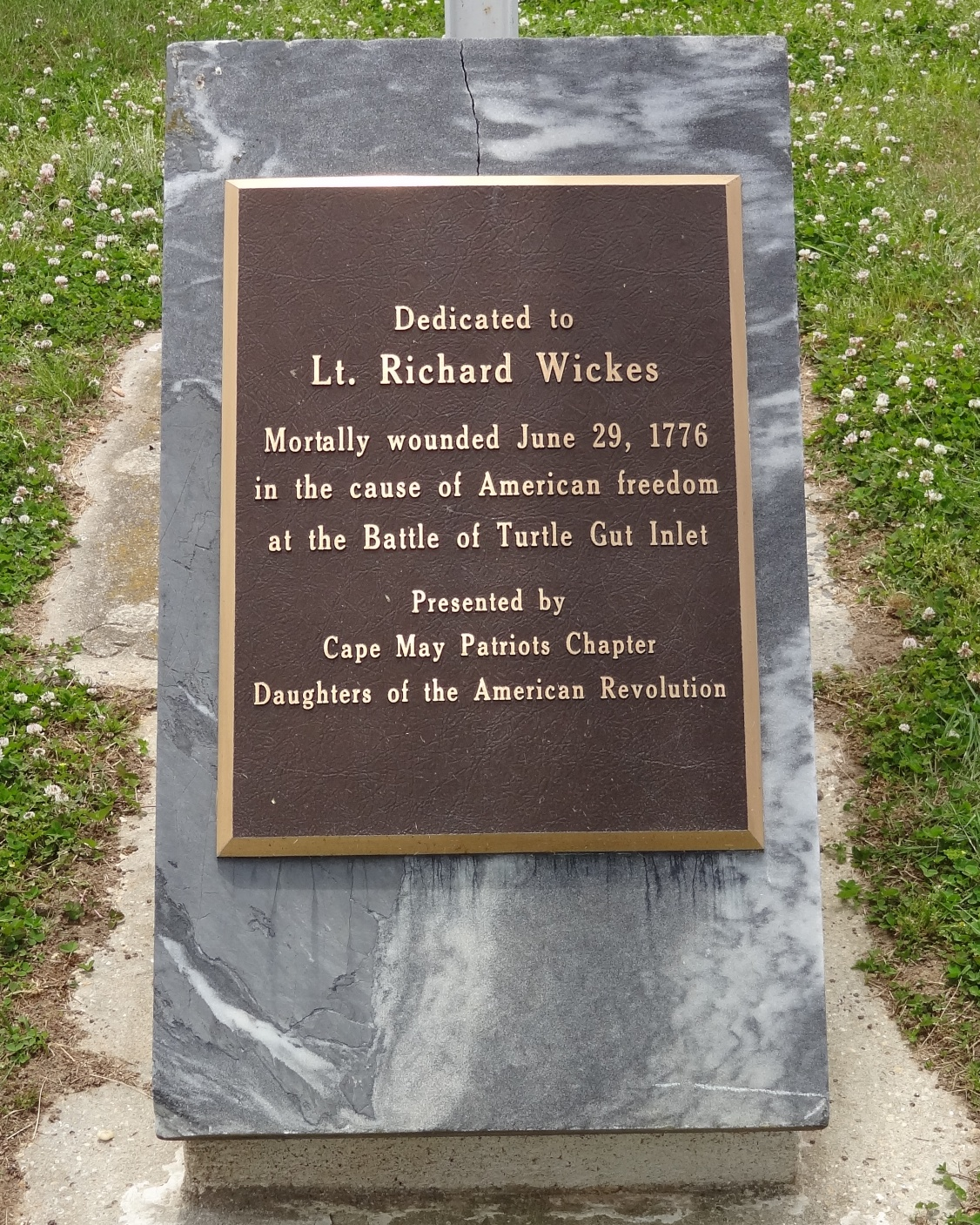
Lieutenant Richard Wickes memorial

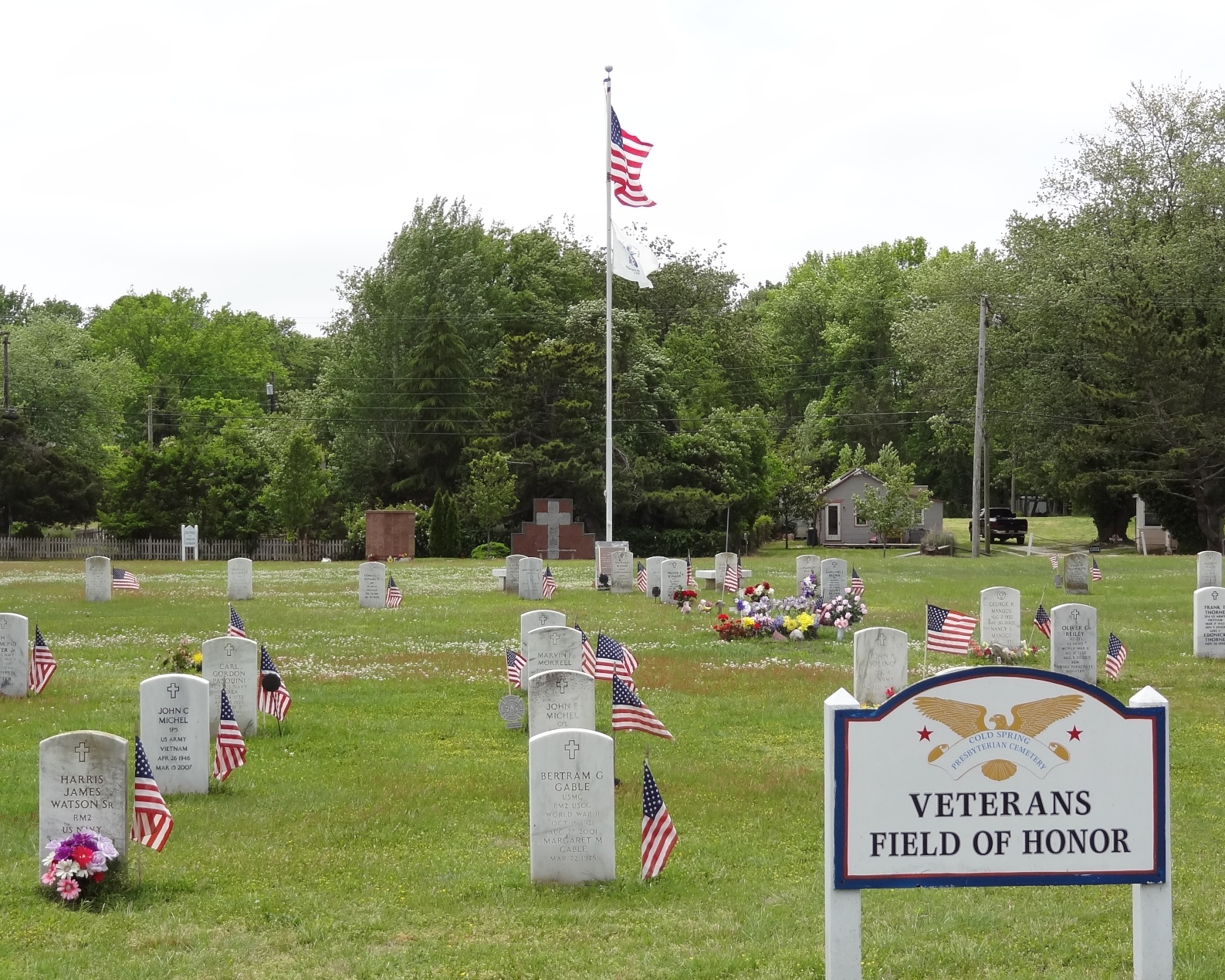
Veterans Field of Honor

== See also ==
- History of the United States Marine Corps
- Naval battles of the American Revolutionary War

== Bibliography ==
- Donnelly, Mark P.; Diehl, Daniel (2010). "The Battle of Turtle Gut Inlet". Pirates of New Jersey. Mechanicsburg, PA: Stackpole Books. ISBN 9780811706674.
- Dorwart, Jeffery M. (1992). Cape May County, New Jersey: The Making of an American Resort Community. New Brunswick, NJ: Rutgers University Press. ISBN 0-8135-1784-2.
- Johnson, Robert Amandus (2006). Saint Croix 1770–1776: The First Salute to the Stars and Stripes. ISBN 978-1-4259-7008-6.
- Mays, Terry M. (2009). Historical dictionary of the American Revolution (2nd ed.). Lanham, Maryland: Scarecrow Press, Inc. ISBN 978-0-8108-6066-7.
- Morgan, William James, ed. (1970). Naval Documents of The American Revolution, American Theatre: May 9, 1776 – July 31, 1776 (PDF). Vol. 5. Washington, D.C.: Naval History Division/Naval Historical Center, Department of the Navy.
- Williams, Thomas (2008). America's First Flag Officer – Father of the American Navy. Bloomington, Indiana: AuthorHouse. ISBN 978-1-4343-8653-3.
