= HMS Orpheus (1773) =

Frigate of the Royal Navy

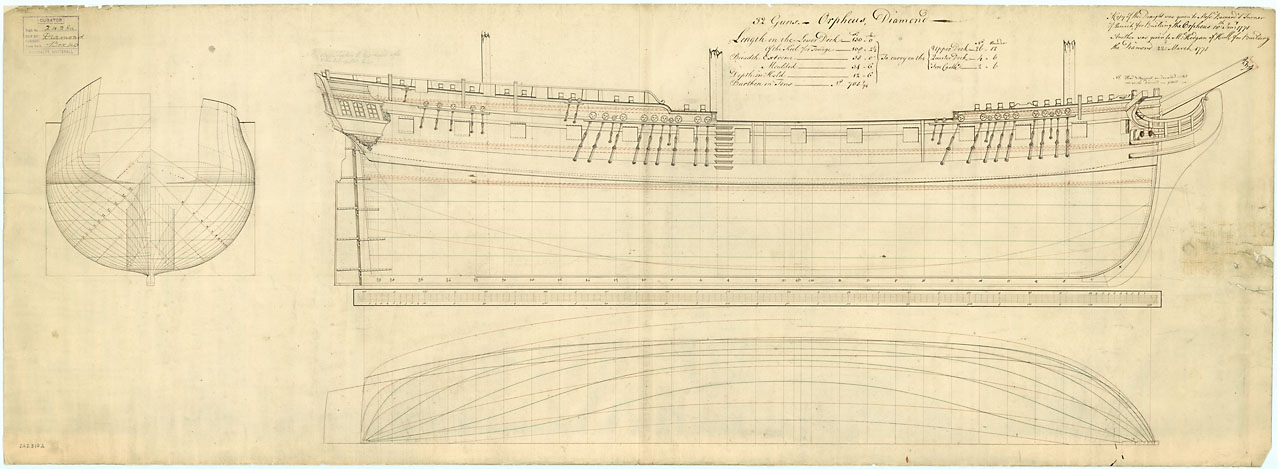
- Orpheus

History

Great Britain
- Name: HMS Orpheus
- Ordered: 1771
- Builder: John Barnard, Harwich
- Laid down: May 1771
- Launched: 7 May 1773
- Commissioned: 11 June 1773
- Fate: Burnt to avoid capture at Newport, Rhode Island, 5 August 1778

General characteristics
- Class & type: Lowestoffe-class frigate
- Tons burthen: 708 40/94 bm
- Length: 130 ft 0 in (39.62 m)
- Beam: 35 ft 1 in (10.69 m)
- Depth of hold: 12 ft 6 in (3.81 m)
- Propulsion: Sail
- Complement: 220–
- Armament: UD: Twenty-six 12 lb guns; QD: Four 6 lb guns; FC: Two 6 lb guns; 12 swivels

HMS Orpheus was a British Modified Lowestoffe-class fifth-rate frigate, ordered on 25 December 1770, as one of five fifth-rate frigates of 32 guns each contained in the emergency frigate-building programme inaugurated when the likelihood of war with Spain arose over the ownership of the Falkland Islands (eight sixth-rate frigates of 28 guns each were ordered at the same time). Sir Thomas Slade's design for Lowestoffe was approved, but was revised to produce a more rounded midships section; the amended design was approved on 3 January 1771 by Edward Hawke's outgoing Admiralty Board, just before it was replaced. The contract to build the Orpheus was awarded to John Barnard at Harwich, the keel being laid in May 1771, and the frigate was launched 7 May 1773, at a cost of £12,654.16.11d. She sailed from Harwich on 24 May for Sheerness Dockyard, where she was completed and fitted out to the Navy Board's needs (for £835.7.7d) by 11 June.

Orpheus measured 130 feet 0 inches (39.62 m) on the gun deck and 108 feet 2.5 inches (32.982 m) on the keel, with a breadth of 35 feet 1 inch (10.69 m) (one inch wider than designed) and a depth in hold of 12 feet 6 inches (3.81 m); a total of 708 40/94 tons burthen. She mounted twenty-six 12-pounder guns on the upper deck, four 6-pounder guns on the quarterdeck, and two 6-pounder guns on the forecastle; she also carried twelve small (half-pounder) swivel guns. She was established with a complement of 220 men.

== Service history ==
Orpheus was first commissioned in early 1773 under Captain John MacBride. She was built by John Barnard at King's Yard in Harwich. On completion, she first took part in the Spithead Review on 22 June 1773, and was then sent cruising in the Channel. She was paid off into ordinary in August 1774. A year later she was recommissioned in July 1775 under Capt. Charles Hudson, was fitted at Plymouth (for £3,729.11.8d) between August and the end of September 1775, and sailed for North America on 30 September 1775. On the afternoon of 28 June 1776, Kingfisher spotted the American privateer Nancy sailing toward Cape May and began chase, followed by Orpheus. Early on the morning of 29 June 1776, Kingfisher and Orpheus resumed chase. Nancy, to evade capture of her supplies of gunpowder and arms, ran aground at Turtle Gut Inlet. She was assisted by the American ships Lexington, Reprisal, and Wasp. In the ensuing battle, Nancy was set on fire and exploded, killing the master's mate and six men on longboats from Kingfisher. On 5 June, 1777 she, HMS Amazon, and HMS Juno recaptured privateer brig "Lucy" 15 Leagues off Nantucket. On 26 March 1778 she recaptured "Neptune" that had been captured by USS Warren.

Orpheus was abandoned and burnt to avoid capture by the French at Rhode Island on 5 August 1778.

== See also ==
- Battle of Rhode Island

== Bibliography ==
- Morgan, William James, ed. (1970). Naval Documents of The American Revolution, American Theatre: May 9, 1776 – July 31, 1776 (PDF). Vol. 5. Washington, D.C.: Naval History Division/Naval Historical Center, Department of the Navy.
- Rif Winfield, British Warships in the Age of Sail, 1714 - 1792, Chatham Publishing.
