= HMS Kingfisher (1770) =

Sloop of the Royal Navy

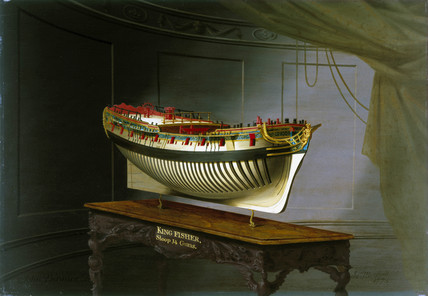
- Painting by Joseph Marshall (1773–1775) of Kingfisher hull model

History

Great Britain
- Name: HMS Kingfisher
- Ordered: 18 January 1766
- Builder: Chatham Dockyard; Master shipwright: Joseph Harris
- Laid down: January 1769
- Launched: 13 July 1770
- Completed: 21 November 1770
- Commissioned: September 1770
- Fate: Burnt to avoid capture at Newport, Rhode Island, 7 August 1778

General characteristics
- Class & type: Swan-class ship sloop
- Tons burthen: 302 8/94 bm
- Length: 96 ft 8 1/2 in (29.5 m) (gundeck); 78 ft 10 1/2 in (24.0 m) (keel)
- Beam: 26 ft 10 in (8.2 m)
- Depth of hold: 12 ft 10 in (3.91 m)
- Complement: 125
- Armament: 14 × 6-pounder guns

HMS Kingfisher (also spelled King's Fisher or Kingsfisher) was the second ship in the 14-gun Swan class of ship sloops, to which design 25 vessels were built in the 1760s and 1770s. She was launched on 13 July 1770 at Chatham Dockyard, and completed there on 21 November 1770. She took part in the American Revolutionary War, enforcing the blockade of the Delaware Bay, and served in the Battle of Turtle Gut Inlet, near Cape May, New Jersey. While under the temporary command of Lieutenant Hugh Christian, she was burnt by her own crew to avoid capture on 7 August 1778 in Narragansett Bay during the Battle of Rhode Island.

== Service history ==
Kingfisher was commissioned in September 1770 under Commander Thomas Jordan, and sailed for North America on 1 August 1771.

In September 1772 command passed to Captain Jacob Lobb who had arrived in Boston, 6 July 1772 on HMS Fowey, until his death 20 February 1773 at North Carolina. Rear Admiral John Montagu wrote to London 20 April 1773 seeking approval for appointing Commander George Montagu, (Her Captain on 1 January 1775 is listed as Cpt. Jas Montagu.)

Sailing to North Carolina in 1772 Captain Lobb caught in gale of wind threw eight 6 pounder guns overboard

HMS Kingfisher passed to Commander Alexander Graeme 14 November 1775.

=== Norfolk ===
Kingfisher under Commander Montagu arrived at Norfolk, Virginia, on 8 September 1775, along with Mercury under Commander Graeme and Otter under Commander Matthew Squire. On 30 September 1775, the mayor and council of Norfolk wrote to Lord Dunmore about the "illegal and riotous" behaviour of the crews of Kingfisher and Otter.

On 1 January 1776, she began a heavy bombardment of Norfolk along with Liverpool and Otter, setting the town on fire.

=== Delaware Bay ===
In early June 1776, while enforcing the blockade of the Delaware Bay, Commander Henry Bellew of Liverpool and Commander Graeme reported to Vice Admiral Molyneux Shuldham about their encounter with the American ships Reprisal, Lexington, and Hornet.

Later in the month, on the afternoon of 28 June 1776, Kingfisher spotted the American privateer Nancy sailing toward Cape May and began chase, followed by Orpheus with Commander Charles Hudson. Early on the morning of 29 June 1776, Kingfisher and Orpheus resumed chase. Nancy, to evade capture of her supplies of gunpowder and arms, ran aground at Turtle Gut Inlet. She was assisted by the American ships Lexington, Reprisal, and Wasp. In the ensuing battle, Nancy was set on fire and exploded, killing the master's mate and six men on longboats from Kingfisher. Also during 1776, Orpheus and Kingfisher captured the Adrian, which was sailing from Philadelphia to France with a cargo of tobacco, flour, bread and staves.

=== Narragansett Bay ===
On 27 August 1777, Kingfisher under Commander Graeme engaged the newly built 14-gun Oliver Cromwell under Captain Samuel Chace, Jr., ran her ashore, and burnt her. During the fight, the brigantine Hampden escaped.

On 7 February 1778, Kingfisher under Lieutenant Hugh Christian was stationed in the Sakonnet Passage to Narragansett Bay. On 30 May, Christian led the boats of the squadron, which were carrying a detachment of troops, in an attack on the saw mills on a creek near Taunton River. The attack was successful.

On 18 March, 1778 she captured a sloop that was aground in Seaconnett Passage, Rhode Island. Unable to refloat her she was burned.

Between 29 May and 18 July, the British captured a number of vessels: the sloops Sally and Fancy, snow Baron D'Ozell, Olive Branch, sloop Betsey, and schooner Sally. Kingfisher shared the prize money with Lark, Hope, Sphinx, and the galley Pigot.

French Admiral d'Estaing's squadron arrived in Narragansett Bay on 29 July 1778 to support the American army under General George Washington during the battle of Rhode Island. As Kingfisher lay in Sakonnet Passage, Christian moved her into Foglands Bay. There she landed all her guns and stores. On 30 July he and her crew abandoned her and set her on fire to prevent the French from capturing her. The Royal Navy ended up having to destroy ten of their own vessels in all.

Lieutenant Christian went on to command the armed ship Vigilant, of 20 guns and 150 men.

== See also ==
- Burning of Norfolk
- Battle of Turtle Gut Inlet
- Battle of Rhode Island
