= USS Dolphin (1777) =

Cutter

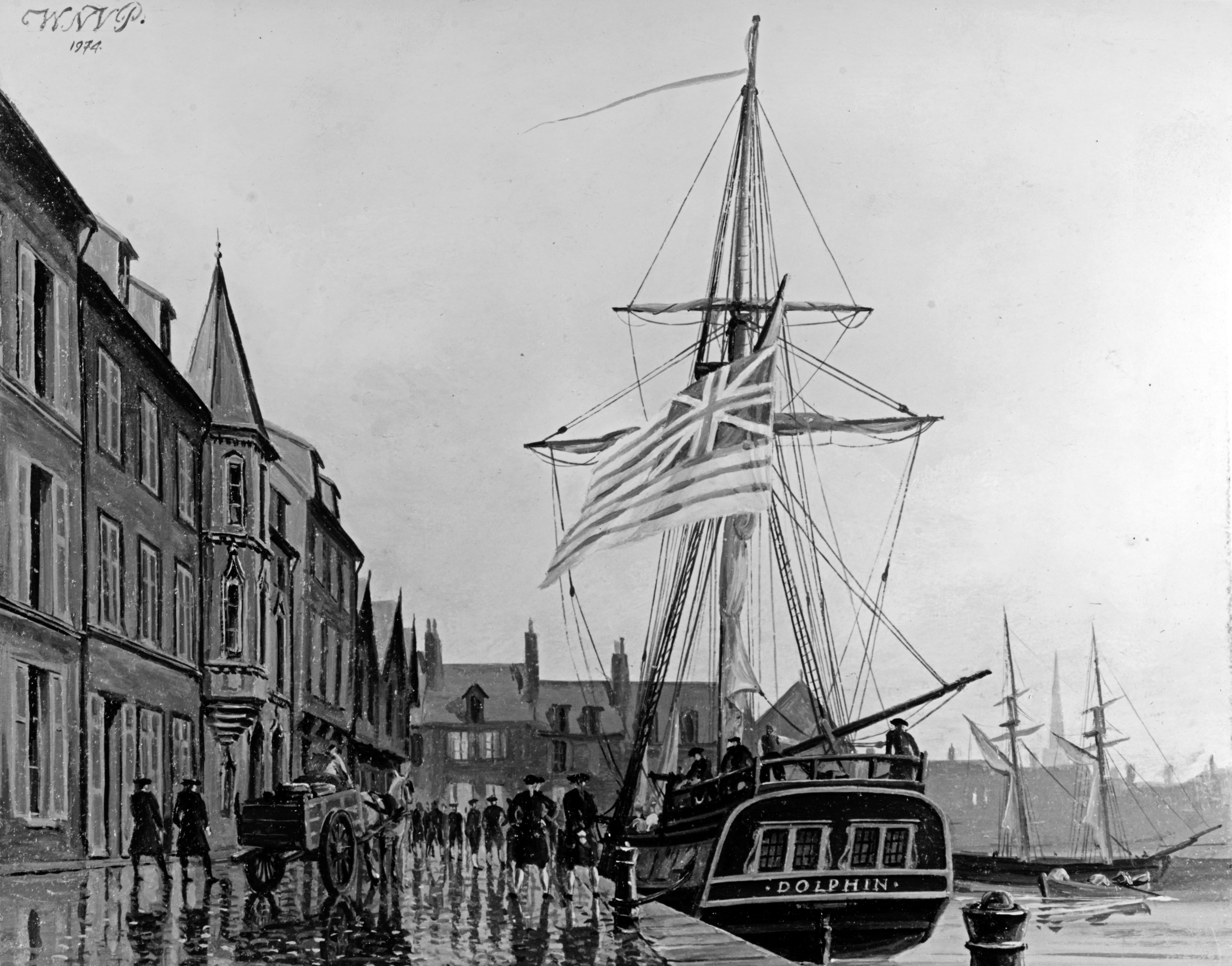
- Dolphin at Lorient in February 1777

History

United States
- Name: USS Dolphin
- Acquired: by purchase, February 1777
- Fate: Sequestered by the French on September 1777

General characteristics
- Type: Cutter
- Propulsion: Sail
- Armament: 10 guns

Service record
- Part of: Continental Navy
- Commanders: Lt. Samuel Nicholson

USS Dolphin was a 10-gun cutter of the Continental Navy.

Dolphin was purchased in February 1777 at Dover, England, and outfitted for use in the Continental Navy at Nantes, France. She was placed under the command of Lieutenant Samuel Nicholson and sailed from St. Auzeau, France on 28 May 1777 with Reprisal and Lexington, in a squadron commanded by Captain Lambert Wickes in Reprisal.

During a cruise off Ireland this squadron captured and sent into port eight prizes, sank seven, and released three, throwing British shipping circles into an uproar. A 74-gun British ship of the line gave chase to the squadron and Reprisal drew her off to enable the other ships to reach port safely. Dolphin arrived at Saint-Malo, France, 27 June 1777 where she was repaired and converted into a packet ship. On 19 September she put into the Loire for further repairs.

Owing to British diplomatic protests that American vessels should not be allowed to use neutral ports to prey upon British-flagged shipping, Dolphin was sequestered by French authorities in September 1777.
