= USS Reprisal (1776) =

American 18-gun brig acquired in 1776

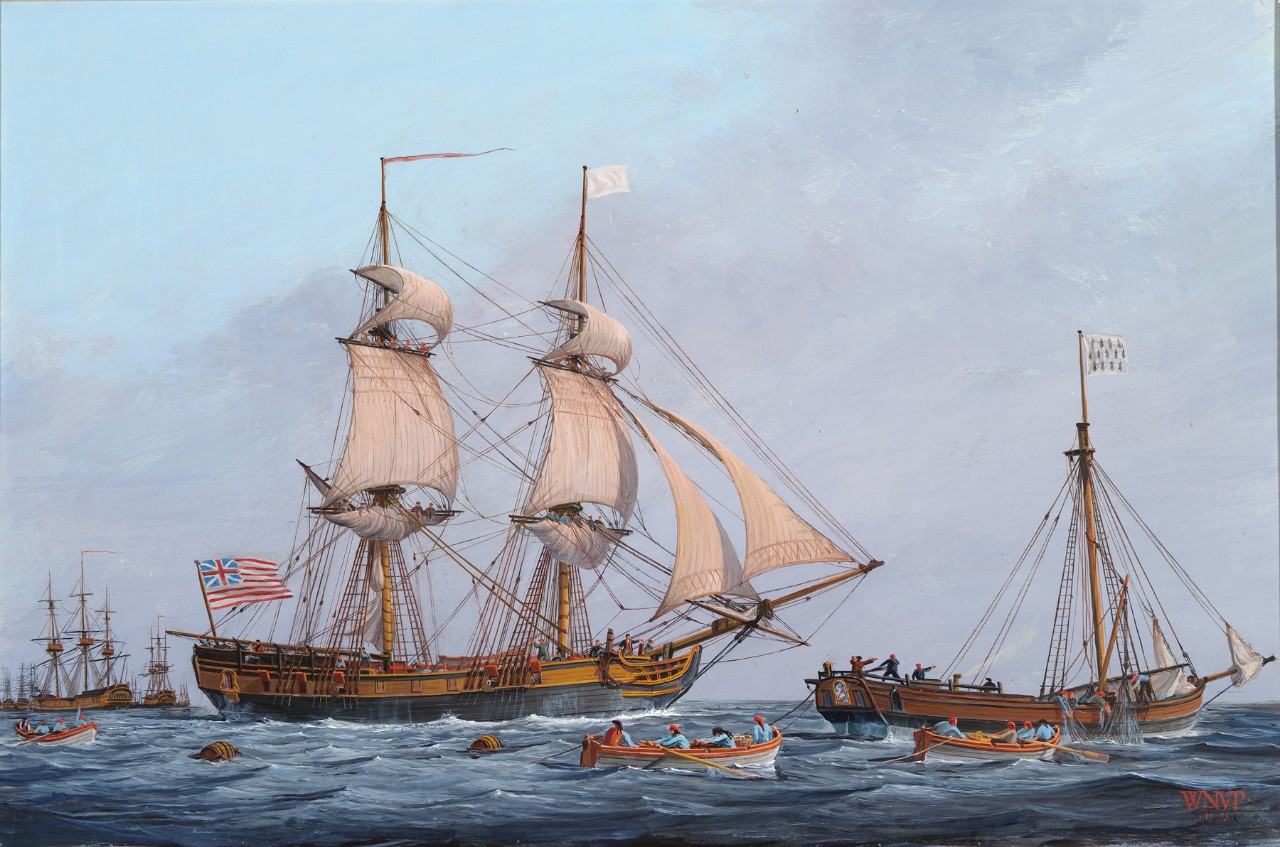
- 1973 painting of Reprisal (center-left) by William Nowland Van Powell

History

United States
- Name: USS Reprisal
- Acquired: March 28, 1776
- Fate: Sunk, October 1, 1777

General characteristics
- Type: Brig
- Length: 100 ft (30 m)
- Beam: 30 ft (9.1 m)
- Complement: 130 officers and enlisted
- Armament: 18 × 6-pounder guns

Service record
- Part of: Continental Navy
- Commanders: Capt. Lambert Wickes
- Operations: Battle of Turtle Gut Inlet

USS Reprisal was an 18-gun brig of the Continental Navy. Originally the merchantman Molly, she was purchased from Robert Morris by the Marine Committee of the Continental Congress on March 28, 1776, renamed Reprisal, and placed under the command of Captain Lambert Wickes.

== Service history ==
=== Caribbean voyage, June–September 1776 ===
On June 10, 1776, the Committee of Secret Correspondence of Congress, by arrangement with the Marine Committee, issued orders to Captain Wickes, to proceed in Reprisal to Martinique and bring from there munitions of war for George Washington's armies, and also to take as passenger Mr. William Bingham, who had been appointed agent from the American colonies to Martinique.

Reprisal dropped down the Delaware River from Philadelphia, Pennsylvania, some time during the latter part of June. Before the Continental armed brig Nancy, six guns, slipped out to the Atlantic, six British men-of-war had sighted and chased her as she was returning from St. Croix and St. Thomas with 386 barrels of gunpowder for the Army. In order to save her, her captain ran her ashore. Captain Wickes, with the crew of Reprisal, aided by Captain John Barry with the crew of USS Lexington, were able to keep off boats from HMS Kingfisher and to save about 200 barrels of powder. Before quitting Nancy, they laid a train of gunpowder which, when Nancy was boarded, blew up killing seven members of the boarding party. In the engagement, Wickes' third lieutenant, his brother, Richard Wickes, lost his life. This engagement, on June 29, became known as the Battle of Turtle Gut Inlet.

Reprisal cleared the Delaware Capes on July 3. During that month, Captain Wickes captured a number of vessels in the West Indies, and, on July 27, had a sharp encounter with HMS Shark off Martinique, beating her off and escaping into port. She returned to Philadelphia on September 13.

=== In European waters, October 1776–February 1777 ===
==== Benjamin Franklin's passage to France ====
On October 24, 1776, Wickes was ordered by Congress to take Reprisal to Nantes, France, carrying Benjamin Franklin, who had been appointed Commissioner to France. Undertaking America's first diplomatic mission, Franklin would remain in France for nine years as ambassador. Franklin was accompanied on Reprisal by two of his grandsons, William Temple Franklin and Benjamin Franklin Bache. Reprisal afterwards was to cruise against enemy shipping in the English Channel.

Reprisal became the first vessel of the Continental Navy to arrive in European waters. En route to France, Reprisal captured two British brigs, reaching Nantes on November 29, 1776.

==== Off the Spanish coast and return to France ====
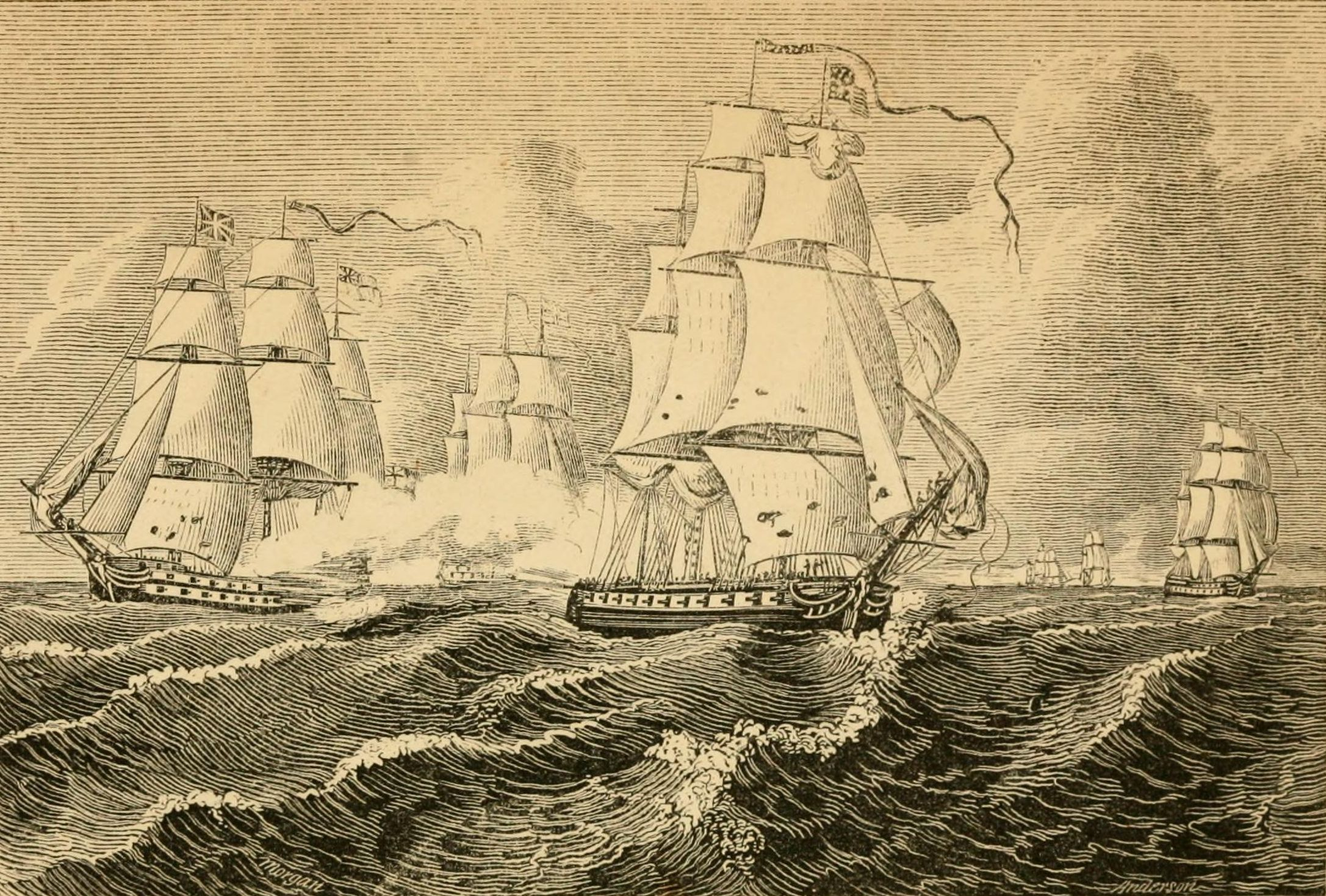
1848 illustration of Reprisal being chased by British warships

On December 17, 1776, Reprisal docked at Saint-Nazaire, France, where Wickes prepared the ship for her first cruise in European waters. She set sail again on January 24, 1777, cruising along the coast of Spain, in the Bay of Biscay and in the mouth of the English Channel.

Five prizes were captured on the cruise. On February 5, Reprisal boarded and captured a 16-gun British packet ship, two days out of Falmouth, Cornwall, after a hard fight of 40 minutes in which two officers of Reprisal were seriously wounded and one man killed. After taking his prizes into Port Louis on February 13, 1777, touching off a diplomatic furor, Wickes sailed for L'Orient to end the cruise on February 14.

Lord Stormont, the British ambassador to France, demanded that the French government expel Reprisal for violating France's neutrality, and demanded the return of the captured ships. However, Wickes had been able to arrange, with Franklin's assistance, a clandestine sale of the prize vessels before the French could take action.

Ultimately, Reprisal was ordered to leave in 24 hours by the French authorities, who had been stirred to action by the remonstrances of the British government. Wickes, however, claimed that Reprisal had sprung a leak and should be careened for repairs. He received permission to make his repairs and by excuses was able several times to defeat the intentions of those in charge of the port while he made ready for another cruise.

=== Cruise around Ireland, April–June 1777 ===
In April 1777 Reprisal was joined by the Continental vessels Lexington (16 guns), and Dolphin (10 guns), these three vessels constituting a squadron under the command of Wickes. The American Commissioners in Paris sent the squadron on a cruise along the shores of the British Isles, where Wickes had planned an attack on the Irish linen merchant fleet.

Leaving Saint-Nazaire on May 28, 1777, they entered the Irish Sea by way of the North Channel, and cruised clockwise around the coast of Ireland. On June 19, they took their first prizes—two brigs and two sloops. During the following week, they cruised in the Irish Sea and made 14 additional captures, comprising two ships, seven brigs and five other vessels. Of these 18 prizes, eight were sent into port, three were released, and seven sunk, three of them within sight of Irish ports.

Having created serious turmoil in the British shipping industry, Reprisal returned to Saint-Malo, France at the end of June to face a diplomatic crisis. Lord Stormont increased his pressure on France to remain neutral, accusing the French of having aided and abetted the American ships, and threatening war unless they were expelled from French-controlled ports. To avoid war with Britain, French authorities detained Wickes and sequestered Reprisal and her companions until mid-September 1777, during which time the three vessels were refitted. The detention was lifted after Wickes assured the French that he would return to America. The Dolphin attempted to remain in Nantes under French colors, but she was seized by the authorities.

=== Loss, October 1777 ===
On September 14, 1777, Reprisal left France, for the United States. About October 1, Reprisal was lost off the banks of Newfoundland and all 129 on board, except the cook, went down with her.
