= USS Lexington (1776) =

Brigantine of the Continental Navy

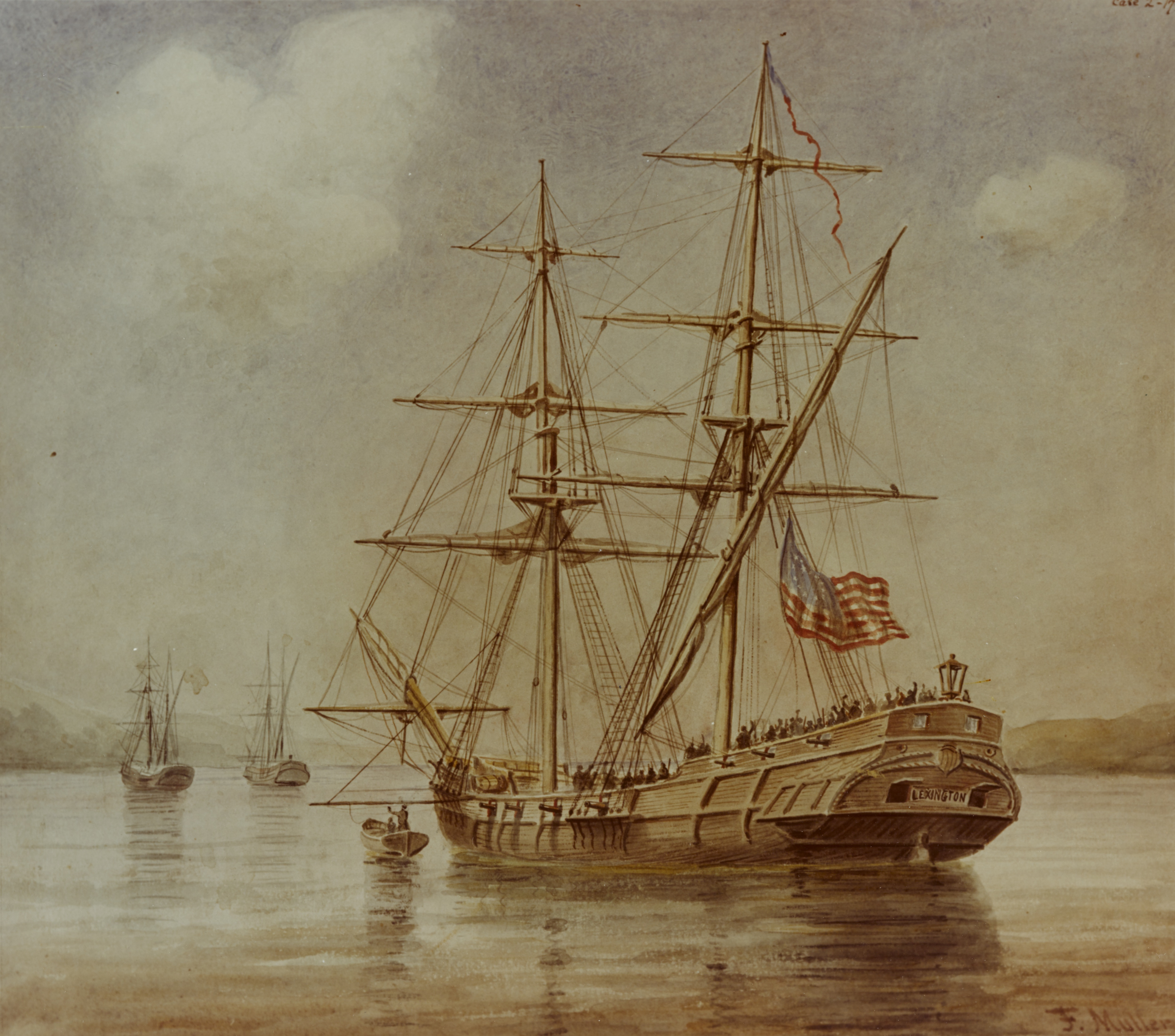
- 1900 painting of Lexington by F. Muller

History

United States
- Name: USS Lexington
- Acquired: 1776
- Fate: Captured by the British, 19 September 1777

General characteristics
- Type: Brigantine
- Length: 86 ft (26 m)
- Beam: 24 ft 6 in (7.47 m)
- Complement: 110 officers and men
- Armament: 14 × 4-pounder guns; 2 × 6-pounder guns; 12 × swivels

Service record
- Commanders: Capt. John Barry; Capt. William Hallock; Capt. Henry Johnson
- Operations: Battle of Turtle Gut Inlet

USS Lexington was a 16-gun brigantine of the Continental Navy. Purchased by the navy in 1776, she was 86-foot (26 m) and served in the American Revolutionary War before being captured by the British in 1777.

== History ==
Originally named the Wild Duck, Abraham van Bibber purchased her for the Maryland Committee of Safety, at St. Eustatius in the Dutch West Indies in February 1776. She soon got underway for the Delaware Capes and reached Philadelphia, Pennsylvania, on 9 March with a cargo of sorely needed gunpowder for the patriot forces. Four days later, the Marine Committee purchased Wild Duck, renamed her Lexington after the Battle of Lexington (the first battle of the war), and turned her over to Wharton and Humphry for fitting out.

Commanded by Capt. John Barry, Lexington dropped down the Delaware River 26 March and slipped through the British blockade 6 April. The following day she fell in with British sloop Edward, a tender to the frigate Liverpool. After a fierce fight which lasted about an hour Edward struck her colors. Lexington took her prize into Philadelphia and as soon as the ship was back in fighting trim, Barry put to sea again. On 26 April Lexington encountered Sir Peter Parker's fleet sailing to attack Charleston, South Carolina. Two of the British ships gave chase on 5 May off the Delaware Capes. HMS Roebuck and Liverpool chased Lexington for eight hours and came close enough to exchange fire with the American ship before Barry managed to elude his pursuers and reach Philadelphia safely.

Lexington and Reprisal dropped down the Delaware to Cape May on the 20th, there joining Wasp and Hornet. Liverpool stood off the Delaware Capes preventing the American ships from escaping to sea. On 28 June Pennsylvanian brig Nancy arrived in the area with 386 barrels of powder in her hold and ran aground while attempting to elude British blockader Kingfisher. Barry ordered the precious powder rowed ashore during the night leaving only 100 barrels in Nancy at dawn. A delayed action fuse was left inside the brig, which exploded the powder just as a boatload of British seamen boarded Nancy. This engagement became known as the Battle of Turtle Gut Inlet.

On 10 July Lexington slipped to sea. On the 27th she captured Lady Susan, a ship of Lord Dunmore's Tory Fleet which operated out of the Chesapeake Bay. This privateer was commanded by William Goodrich, a member of the notorious Tory family which had plagued the shipping of Virginia and Maryland. (Richard Dale, one of seven members of the Lady Susan crew who signed on Lexington, later won fame under John Paul Jones.) Early in September, Lexington took another sloop, Betsy. About a fortnight later lightning struck Lexington forcing the brigantine home for repairs. Lexington anchored off Philadelphia 26 September, and two days later Barry relinquished command.

With repairs completed, Lexington, Capt. William Hallock in command, got underway for Cape Francois to obtain military cargo. On the return voyage, British frigate Pearl overhauled the brigantine just short of the Delaware Capes 20 December and captured her. The commander of the frigate removed Lexington's officers, but left 70 of her men on board under hatches with a prize crew. But by luring their captors with a promise of rum, the Yankee sailors recaptured the ship and brought her to Baltimore.

Lexington, now with Capt. Henry Johnson in command, sailed for France 20 February 1777 and took two prizes before reaching Bordeaux in March. In France, the brigantine joined Reprisal and Dolphin for a cruise seeking the Irish linen fleet scheduled to leave Dublin early in June. The American ships, commanded by Capt. Lambert Wickes, got underway 28 May and were carried far to westward by heavy winds. Approaching Dublin from the north they entered the north channel 18 June and hove to off the Mull of Kintyre. During the next four days they captured nine prizes, sinking three, releasing one, and retaining five. Heading south again on the 22nd, they took and scuttled a brig before arriving off Dublin Bay. The next morning they took another brig and released a ship bringing sugar, rum, and cotton from Jamaica. After placing prize crews on both vessels, they resumed their voyage around Ireland. On the 24th they stopped and released a smuggler and the next day took their last prize, a snow.

When they sighted ship-of-the-line HMS Burford near Ushant on the 26th, the American ships scattered and made their way individually to safety in France. Lexington remained at Morlaix, a Brittany fishing village, throughout the summer, hemmed in by British warships. However, France, under strong British diplomatic pressure, ordered the American ships out of French waters 12 September. Lexington got underway the next morning but made little headway because of light wind. She lay becalmed near Ushant on the morning of 19 September when British 10-gun cutter Alert, commanded by John Bazely, came into view. In the ensuing fight, Lexington's rigging was seriously damaged, precluding flight. When the American brigantine ran out of powder, Captain Johnson reluctantly struck his colors.

== See also ==
- Battle of Turtle Gut Inlet
