= Powder keg =

Barrel of gunpowder

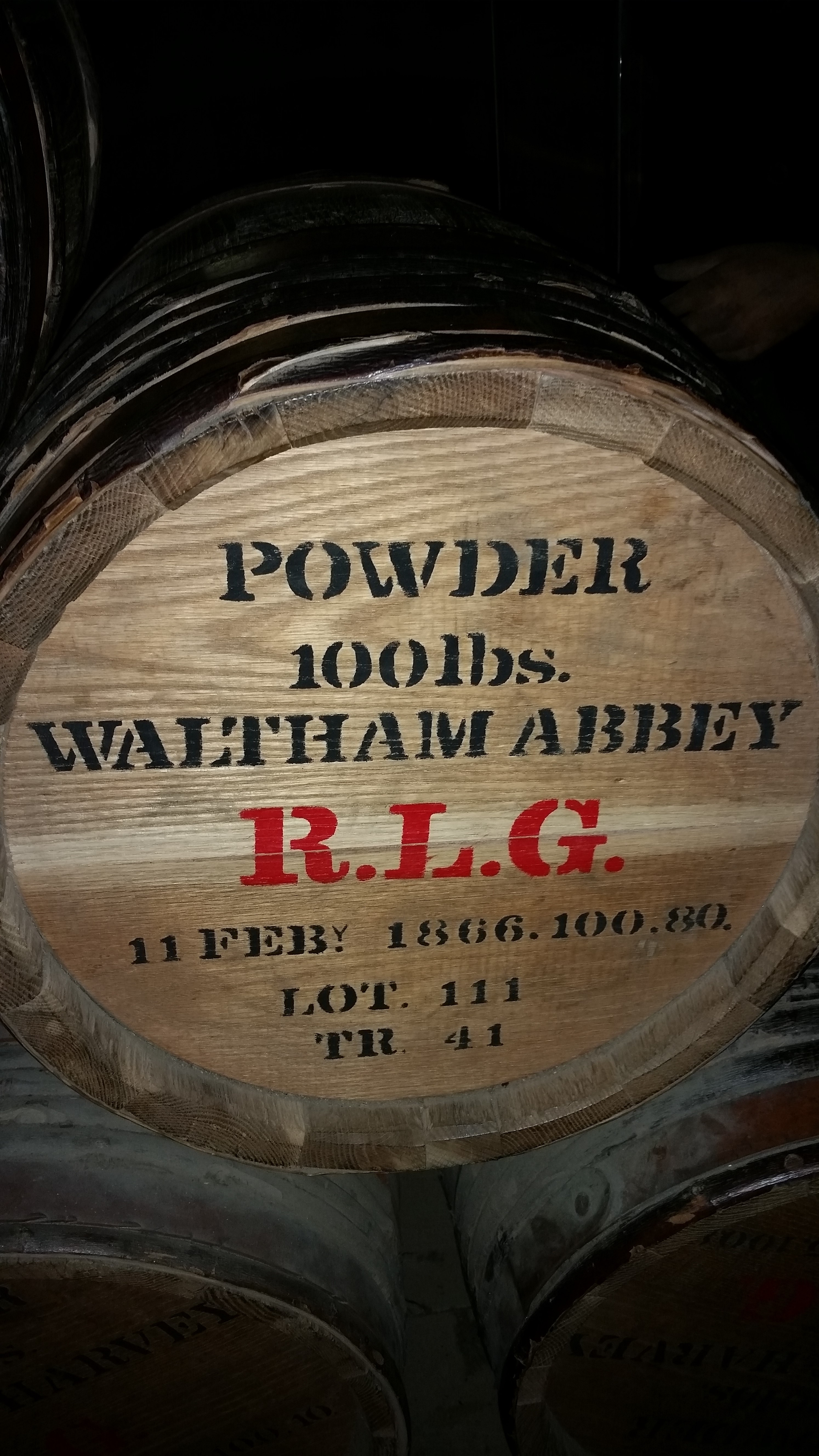
Rifle large grain gunpowder barrel at Fort George's Citadel Hill

A powder keg is a barrel of gunpowder. The powder keg was the primary method for storing and transporting large quantities of black powder until the 1870s and the adoption of the modern cased cartridge. The barrels had to be handled with care, since a spark or other source of heat could cause the contents to deflagrate.

In practical use, powder kegs were small casks to limit damage from accidental explosions. Today they are valued as collectibles. Specimens of early American kegs for gunpowder are found in sizes like 8 3/4 inches (22 cm) tall by 6 1/2 inches (17 cm) diameter and 13 inches (33 cm) tall by 11 inches (28 cm) diameter, often with strappings of reed or sapling wood rather than metal bands to avoid sparks. Kegs for blasting powder used for mining or quarrying were often larger than kegs for shipping and storing powder for firearms.

== As a metaphor ==
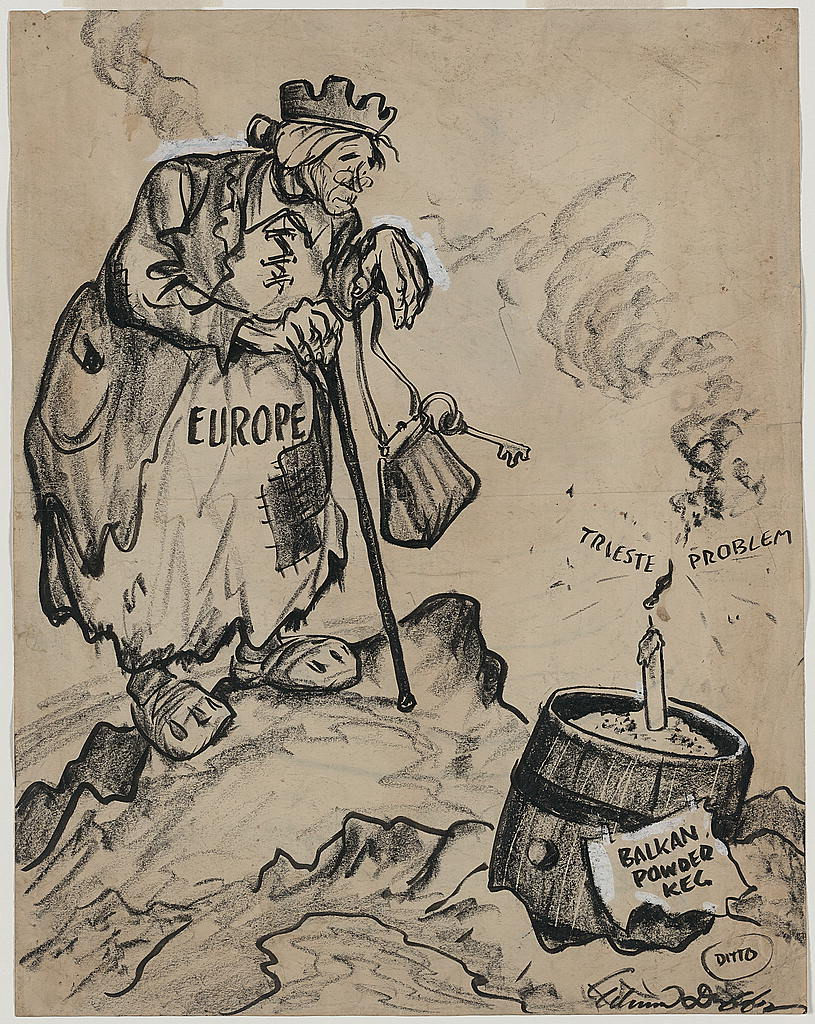
"Balkan powder keg" as the dispute between Italy and Yugoslavia over Trieste, a cartoon by Edmund Duffy

A powder keg is also a metaphor for a region that political, socioeconomic, historical or other circumstances have made prone to outbursts. The analogy is drawn from a perception that certain territories may seem peaceful and dormant until another event triggers a large outburst of violence. The term is most often used to simplify and help the understanding of what is often a complex set of circumstances that lead to conflicts, such as the powder keg of Europe.

While the term can be used to designate the entire region of Europe, it is often used specifically to refer to the Balkans, due to its role in the Balkan Wars and World War I. The most cited event attributed to the use of the term was the assassination of Archduke Franz Ferdinand in Sarajevo, Condominium of Bosnia and Herzegovina in 1914, the immediate trigger of World War I.
