= USS Wasp (1775) =

Continental Navy schooner

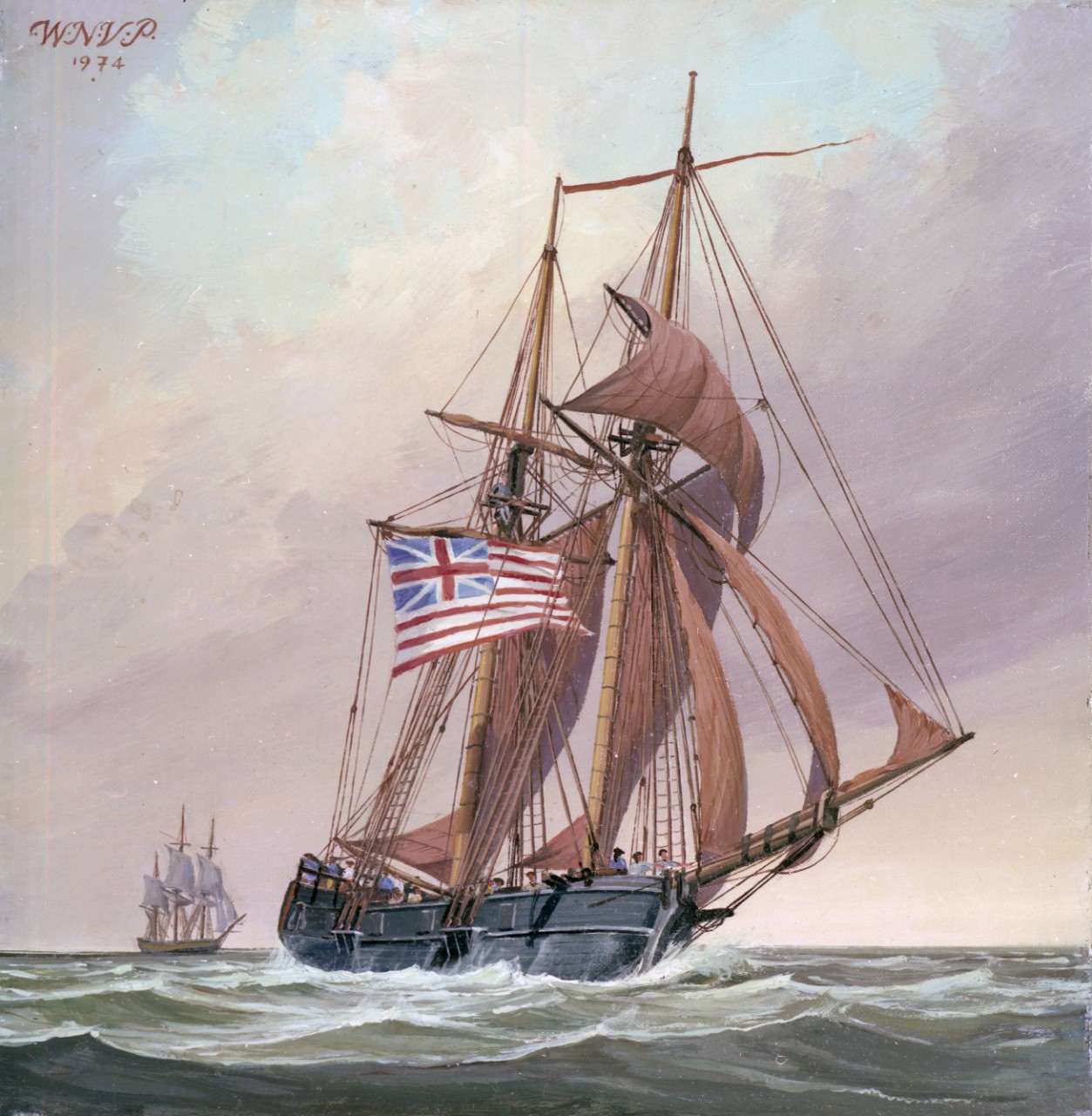
- Painting of Wasp by William Nowland Van Powell

History

United States
- Name: USS Wasp
- Acquired: December 1775
- Commissioned: December 1775 or January 1776
- Fate: Destroyed, November 1777

General characteristics
- Type: Schooner
- Tons burthen: 189 tons
- Length: gun-deck 74 ft 10 in (22.81 m)
- Beam: 24 ft 8 in (7.52 m)
- Armament: 8 × 2-pounder guns; 6 × swivel guns

Service record
- Commanders: Capt. William Hallock
- Operations: Battle of Nassau; Battle of Turtle Gut Inlet

USS Wasp was an 8-gun schooner of the Continental Navy. She was originally the merchantman Scorpion, built at Baltimore, and purchased under authority from the Second Continental Congress dated 2 December 1775 by Col. Benjamin Harrison sometime between 2 and 18 December 1775, the first American naval ship to be given that name. She was outfitted in Baltimore from December 1775 to early 1776; and commissioned in December 1775 or January 1776, Capt. William Hallock in command.

Wasp set sail from Baltimore on 14 January 1776 in company with Hornet and a convoy of ships bound for the Delaware Capes. By virtue of their voyage to meet Commodore Esek Hopkins' squadron at the Delaware Capes, Wasp and Hornet appear to be the first ships of the Continental Navy to get to sea. They joined Hopkins' squadron on 13 February; and, four days later, the first American squadron to put to sea began its maiden voyage.

Interpreting his orders rather liberally, by ignoring those portions which related to operations in the Chesapeake Bay and along the southern coast of the colonies, Hopkins led his fleet directly to the Bahamas. The ships, minus Hornet and Fly, arrived at Abaco in the Bahamas on 1 March, and Hopkins began laying plans for the raid on New Providence. The fleet ran in to attempt a landing at the port of Nassau but failed to achieve surprise. The landing, therefore, went forward several miles to the east of the town. Wasp and Providence covered the Continental Marines as they went ashore, but their guns never fired because the landing was not opposed. That afternoon, the landing force took Fort Montague and the following day captured the town of Nassau and Fort Nassau. They took a large quantity of cannon—close to 90 pieces, and 15 brass mortars—but the governor had managed to foil the mission in its primary objective by spiriting away the bulk of the gunpowder which had been stored there. Hopkins had to settle for 24 casks of powder out of the 174 originally stored there. The cannon and other military stores captured, however, more than justified the enterprise.

The fleet remained at Nassau for about two weeks loading the booty of war. So large was the take that several local ships had to be pressed into service to carry the materiel back to North America. Hopkins' squadron finally hoisted sail on 17 March and set course for New England. Wasp, however, parted with the main fleet and made her way independently back to the Delaware capes and thence into port at Philadelphia, where she arrived on 4 April.

After repairs at Philadelphia, Wasp returned to duty in the Delaware River and Bay. On 5 May, two British men-of-war, the 44-gun Roebuck and 28-gun Liverpool, entered the bay with several prizes. In the face of these two formidable enemies, Wasp retreated into Christiana Creek, but came out again on the 8th to join a force of galleys in attacking Roebuck after she had run aground. During the ensuing engagement, the Continental schooner captured the British brig HMS Betsey and took her into Philadelphia where the ship's officers were placed in jail.

The schooner continued to operate on the Delaware River and Bay and along the nearby Atlantic coast for the remainder of her career. On 28 June, she engaged in the Battle of Turtle Gut Inlet to salvage the cargo of Nancy. Near the end of the year, she took three more prizes—Leghorn Galley late in October, Two Brothers in December, and an unnamed sloop that same month. She also recaptured Success, an American ship previously taken by Roebuck.

Into the fall of 1777, Wasp continued her operations in the vicinity of the Delaware Capes until November when she and four other ships unsuccessfully engaged the British force under Admiral Sir Richard Howe. Philadelphia had already fallen to Howe's brother, General Sir William Howe, late in September, but American forces retained control of the river below the city until losing that engagement. Following the clash, Wasp was run aground, set afire, and destroyed when her gunpowder exploded.

== See also ==
- List of schooners
- Bibliography of early American naval history
