= Longboat =

Type of boat

A longboat is a type of ship's boat that began wide-use in the 1500s or before. Though the Royal Navy replaced longboats with launches from 1780, examples can be found in merchant ships after that date. The longboat was usually the largest boat carried by each ship. In the early period of use, a ship's longboat was often so large that it could not be carried on board and was instead towed. For instance, a 1618 survey of Royal Navy ships' boats listed a 52 ft 4 in (16 m) longboat used by the First Rate Prince, a ship whose length of keel was 115 ft (35 m). This could lead to the longboat being lost in adverse weather. By the middle of the 17th century, it became increasingly more common to carry the longboat on board, though not universally. In 1697 some British ships chasing a French squadron cut adrift the longboats they were towing in an attempt to increase their speed and engage with the enemy.

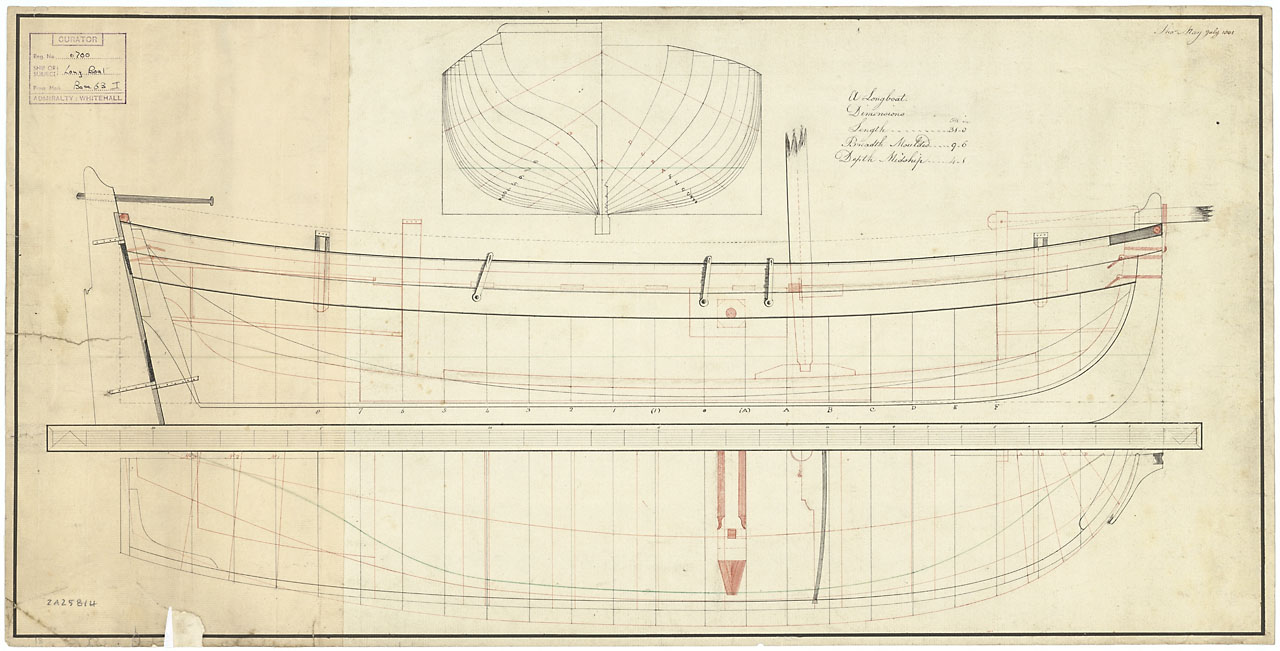
Lines for a 31 ft longboat drawn in 1801. The windlass for working an anchor can be seen drawn in red, abaft the mast.

The longboat was used for transporting heavy weights. The two most important of these were casks of drinking water, and an anchor and its cable. The supply of water to (particularly) sailing ships was so vital that all the boats of a ship would have some capability to carry water, but the longboat had the greatest capacity. The casks carried by a large boat would be "leaguers", which held 150 imperial gallons (680 L). These would be laid in the bilges between the thwarts, filling most of the bottom of the boat and making a load of several tonnes. Anchor handling was of special importance before tugs became widely available. A boat would be used to carry either a stream anchor or a kedge into position so that the ship may be pulled out of harbour or away from a hazard. As well as dropping the anchor in position, the longboat would often be used for weighing (raising) the anchor after use. To do this, a windlass was usually fitted amidships and a davit in the stern (or sometimes the bow) to provide a fair lead from the buoy rope (Note: A buoy rope is attached to the crown of an anchor so that when it is pulled it "trips" the anchor and it is easier to lift out of the sea bed than if the anchor cable is hauled.) or cable to the windlass. A substantial degree of buoyancy was needed in the stern (or bow) to lift a heavy anchor.

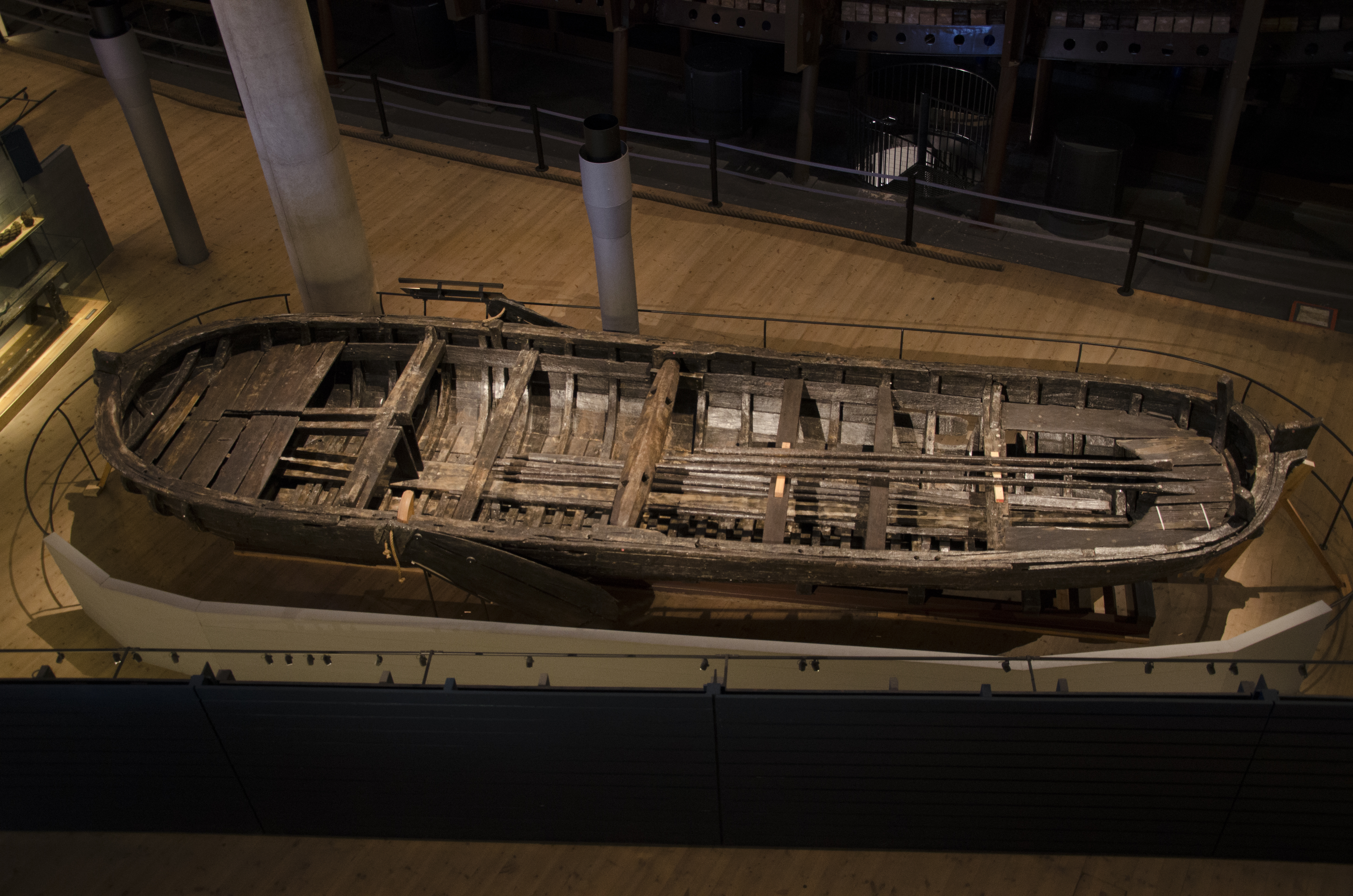
The longboat from Vasa. Whilst differing from many longboat designs (this example is double ended, when other longboats had a transom stern) the picture shows the windlass amidships for raising an anchor.

Other heavy weights carried by a longboat included guns - either as armament for the boat or simply to transport to or from the ship. Special slides were developed for armed boats, so that the gun could be traversed. These would also allow the gun to be slid down into a lower position when not in use, to improve the stability of the boat. Boats were regularly armed, even if only for defensive purposes. Swivel guns were sometimes used to protect the boat when collecting drinking water. Ship's boats were often used offensively, either on their own or when their parent ships were in action.

The longboat usually had the largest passenger-carrying capacity out of a ship's boats. Longboats were used by both warships and merchant ships.

A longboat was fitted so that it could be propelled either by oars or by sail. The oars were double-banked - with two oarsmen on each thwart, each using an oar on their own side. The usual sailing rig was single-masted, with a gaff mainsail and two headsails - the jib was set on a bowsprit and the staysail to the stemhead. This is a cutter rig, not to be confused with the ship's boat termed a cutter.

A ship would usually carry the largest longboat it could store on deck. Consequently, their size varied depending on the size of the parent ship. However, too large a boat could interfere with the handling of a ship or her guns, and the weight of a longboat could put excessive strain on the masts and yards that were used for hoisting the boat in and out of the water. Smaller ships might carry a yawl instead of a longboat. The sizes of longboats in the Royal Navy in circa 1705 were recorded in a shipwright's notebook as follows.

Sizes of longboat in use in the Royal Navy circa 1705
Length	Beam	Number of oars	Example of use on
34 ft (10 m)	9 ft 10 in (3.00 m)	10	
33 ft (10 m)	9 ft 7 in (2.92 m)	10	
32 or 31 ft (9.8 or 9.4 m)	9 ft 0 in (2.74 m)	10	74 gun ship
30 ft (9.1 m)	8 ft 5 in (2.57 m)	10	
29 ft (8.8 m)	8 ft 2 in (2.49 m)	8	
28 ft (8.5 m)	7 ft 8 in (2.34 m)	7	
27 ft (8.2 m)	7 ft 6 in (2.29 m)	7	
26 ft (7.9 m)	7 ft 4 in (2.24 m)	7	
25 or 24 ft (7.6 or 7.3 m)	7 ft 2 in (2.18 m)	6	
23 or 22 ft (7.0 or 6.7 m)	7 ft 0 in (2.13 m)	6	36 or 32 gun frigate (Note: This is as per the 1761 scale of boats issued. A 36 or 32 gun frigate would also have a 30 ft pinnace and a 24 ft yawl.)

The Royal Navy started to replace longboats with launches from November 1780. This instruction was implemented for all ships of 20 guns and above being built or coming in for repair. There are earlier instances of individual warships requesting a launch instead of a longboat, with several examples in the 1740s. The advantages of a launch were ease of use in carrying water and stores and a greater number of passengers being accommodated. However a longboat was considered to be more seaworthy. Longboats could be found in merchant service after the Royal Navy had ceased to use them.
