= Annie Palmer (White Witch of Rose Hall) =

Jamaican legend

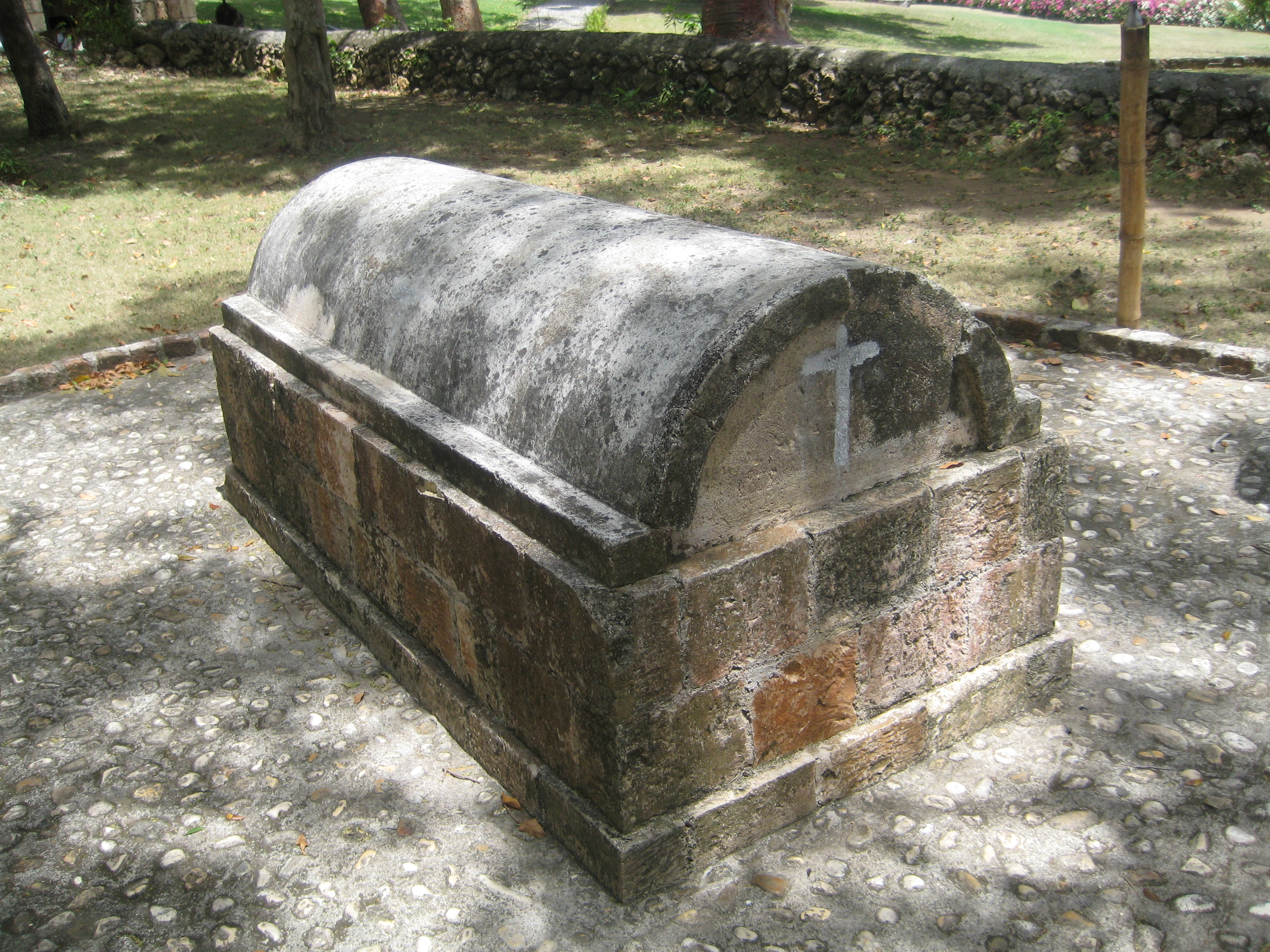
Tomb alleged to be that of Annie Palmer at Rose Hall, Jamaica

The White Witch is a legendary story of a haunting in Jamaica. According to the legend, the spirit of a white plantation owner named Annie Palmer haunts the grounds of Rose Hall, Montego Bay.

== Legend ==
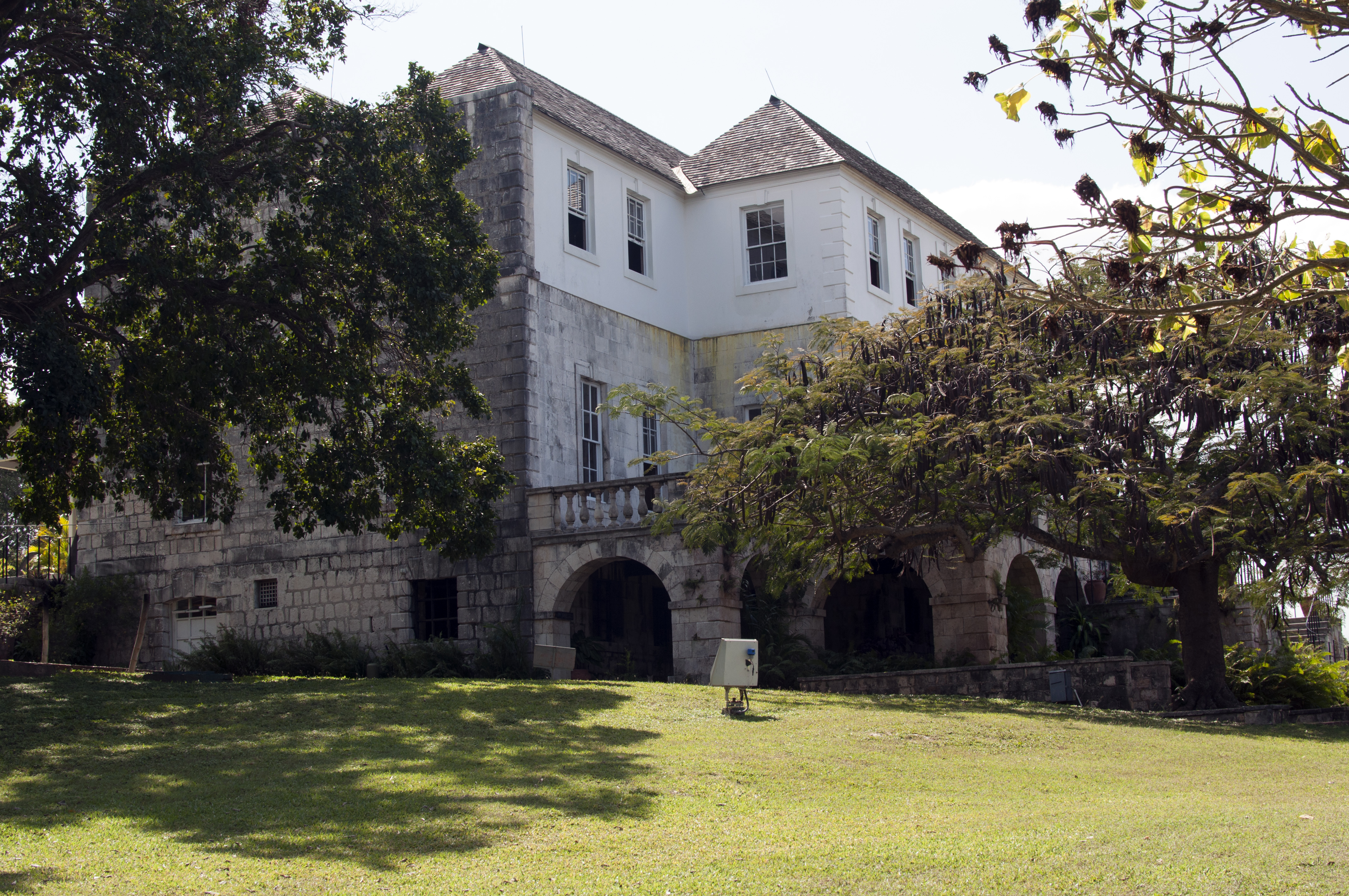
Rose Hall House, Jamaica

According to the legend, the spirit of "Annie Palmer" haunts the grounds of Rose Hall Plantation near Montego Bay. The story states that she was born in Haiti to an English mother and Irish father and spent most of her life in Haiti. When her parents died of yellow fever, she was adopted by a nanny who taught her witchcraft and voodoo. She moved to Jamaica and married John Palmer, owner of Rose Hall Plantation. Annie murdered Palmer along with two subsequent husbands and numerous male plantation slaves, later being murdered herself by a slave named "Takoo". A song about the legend called "The Ballad of Annee Palmer" was recorded by Johnny Cash. For many years Cash owned the nearby Cinnamon Hill Great House.

== Investigations ==
Geoffrey S. Yates, Assistant Archivist at the Jamaica Archives in about 1965, claimed that the false story started with an account by Rev. Hope Masterton Waddell of the strangling of Mrs. Palmer at the adjacent Palmyra Estate in 1830, although the passage in Waddell's memoirs simply includes a footnote claiming: "The estate furnished scenes and characters for Dr. Moore's novel Zeluco. The cellars and spikes used by a lady owner there for the necks of her slaves I have seen, and also the bed on which she was found dead one morning, having been strangled." However, Moore's novel has an anti-slavery theme, and the only scenes set in the Caribbean are located in Cuba and feature none of the details claimed by Waddell. Waddell, himself an abolitionist, was also writing in the context of the Baptist War, of which he was a first-hand witness. He stated that the Palmyra Estate was set on fire alongside the Kensington Estate, located further inland, as a signal for a general insurrection.

The legend was elaborated by the journalist John Castello in 1868. Castello was the owner of the local Falmouth Post when he published a small pamphlet Legend of Rose Hall and erroneously describes a memorial in St. James Church to "Anne Palmer".

An investigation of the legend in 2007 by Benjamin Radford concluded that the story was fictionalized and modelled on the title character in a famous Jamaican novel The White Witch of Rosehall by Herbert G. de Lisser, published in 1929. An Annie Palmer unrelated to Rose Hall did exist, and by all accounts had no tendencies toward sadism or lechery. Rough Guide To Jamaica author Polly Thomas writes that the name of Annie Palmer may have become confused with Rosa Palmer, the original mistress of Rose Hall, who did have four husbands but was said to be unwaveringly virtuous. None of Mrs. Rose Palmer's husbands died by murder or in any suspicious circumstances. The real Mrs. Annie Palmer (née Paterson) was the Jamaican-born wife of the Custos of St. James, and daughter of Dr. Paterson, Custos of Hanover, and his wife. Neither of her two husbands died of murder, and she was not murdered. The Patersons were of Scottish descent, and close relatives of the ancient Paterson of Eccles family of Scotland.

== Popular culture ==
- Barry Reckord's 1975 play White Witch of Rose Hall is based on the legend.
- The television series Ghost Adventures featured an episode at Rose Hall.
- The 1993 novel Voyager by Diana Gabaldon uses Rose Hall as a setting while the main characters are in Jamaica.
- American rock band Coven included the song "The White Witch of Rose Hall" on their first album, Witchcraft Destroys Minds & Reaps Souls (1969).
- The 19th-season finale of America's Next Top Model staged its final runway show at Rose Hall.
- Scariest Places on Earth featured Rose Hall in Season 2 Episode 3, "White Witch".
- Ghost Brothers featured Rose Hall in Season 2 Episode 5, "Rose Hall"
- Ghost Hunters International featured Rose Hall in season 2 episode 13
- The Dead Files covered the legend in season 4, episode 1. Amy Allan, the show's lead investigator, claimed to encounter at least two female ghosts and identified them as Rosa and Annie Palmer.
- The historical drama television series Outlander featured Rose Hall in Season 3, Episode 13.
- cEvin Key of Skinny Puppy released a 2001 solo album entitled The Ghost Of Each Room, which features the famous painting on the cover.
- The 1973 album Any Old Wind That Blows by Johnny Cash featured the song "The Ballad of Annie Palmer" which focused on the story of Annie Palmer.
