= St James Parish Church, Jamaica =

Church in Montego Bay, Jamaica

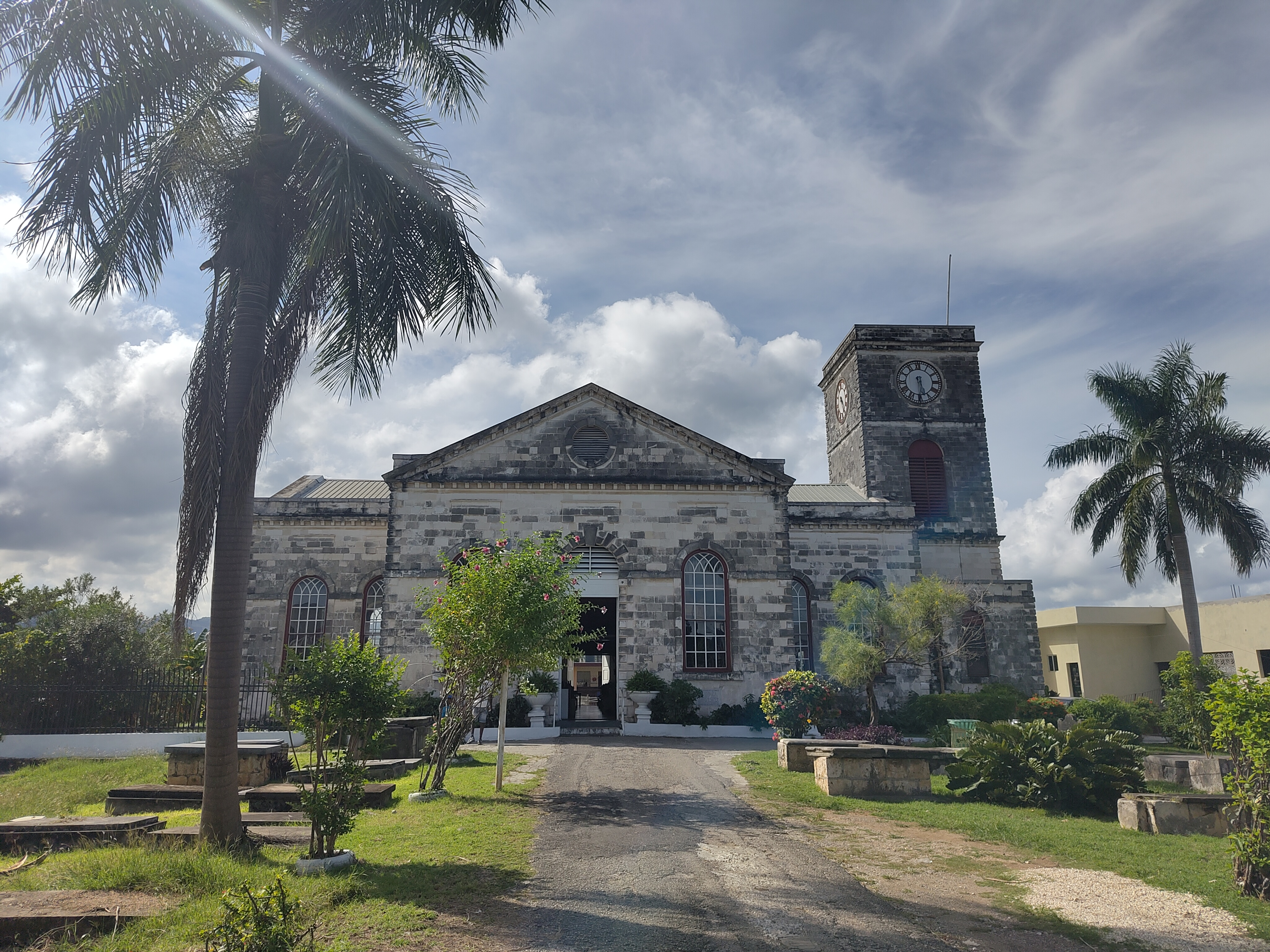
St James Parish Church in 2023

St James Parish Church is an eighteenth-century church in Montego Bay, Jamaica. It was started in 1774 at a time when the town was increasing in importance as a centre for trade and the number of merchants was growing. It was built as the principal Anglican church in St James Parish, in Cornwall County, Jamaica.

The vestry of St James Parish built the church from ashlar, a building material which had become increasingly popular in England, and its use in this church reflected the cosmopolitan tastes of the mercantile elite responsible for its design. Gleaming white limestone was the principle building material. A local source for this stone had been found. The design included a Venetian window in the chancel, an innovation unusual in Jamaican churches of the period, and which may have been influenced by Batty Langley's 1740 The City and Country Builder's and Workman's Treasury of Designs. The opulent and cosmopolitan design signified that Montego Bay was rising in status to become Jamaica's second largest port and a significant location in the British Empire.

== Rosa Palmer Memorial ==
The Rosa Palmer memorial, featuring a sculpture by John Bacon the elder has gained a reputation both from the English sculptor who carved it in 1794, and the subsequent myth of the White Witch of Rose Hall which became wrongly attached to it. Bacon had carved 12 statues in Jamaica, starting off with that of Admiral Rodney in Spanish Town. The memorial is to Rosa Palmer (1718–1790) and bears the following inscription:

Near this place
are deposited the Remains of
Mrs. ROSA PALMER
who died on the first day of May, 1790

Her manners were open, cheerful and agreeable,
and being blessed with a plentiful fortune
hospitality dwelt with her as long as health permitted her to enjoy society.
Educated by the anxious care of a Reverent Divine, her father,
her charities were not ostentatious but of a nobler kind
She was warm in her attachment to her Friends,
and gave the most signal proof of it
in the last moments of her life.

This tribute of affection and respect
is erected by her husband
the Honourable JOHN PALMER
as a monument of her worth
and his gratitude.

The journalist John Castello, proprietor of the Falmouth Post, first created the link to the witch myth in a pamphlet he wrote in 1868 which contained several inaccuracies.
