= Seven Mile Island =

Island in Cape May County, New Jersey, United States

Coordinates: 39.07551°N 74.738789°W

Seven Mile Island or Seven Mile Beach is the name of a barrier island on the Jersey Shore in Cape May County, New Jersey, United States. It is divided between the boroughs of Avalon to the north, from 6th to 80th Streets, and Stone Harbor to the south, from 80th Street to Hereford Inlet.

The island is 7 1/2 miles (12 kilometers) long, and is three to four blocks wide. Known as Leaming's Island in 1722, when the first purchase of its 2,725 acres (1,103 hectares) was recorded, its dunes, woodlands and beaches were purchased for the equivalent of $380.

== Geography ==
Seven Mile Island is a barrier island along the Atlantic Ocean between Townsends Inlet on the northeast, and Hereford Inlet on the southwest. An expanse of salt marsh and tidal channels separates Seven Mile Island from Great Sound, Jenkins Sound, and the mainland.

Seven Mile Island was described in 1834 as,

Leaming's or Seven Mile Beach, Middle t-ship, Cape May co, extending from Townsend's inlet to Hereford inlet, having an average width of half a mile.

An 1878 description of Seven Mile Island is as follows, viz,

Seven Mile Beach south of Townsend's Inlet, and extending to Hereford, is about seven miles long. It is sometimes called Tatham's Beach, from the present owner. This is, perhaps, at this time the most heavily wooded beach on the coast, though formerly the Five and Two Mile beaches were equally as well timbered. The wood is of excellent quality, of oak, red cedar, and other varieties.
