= David Bostwick =

David Bostwick (1721–1763) was a Presbyterian minister, born at New Milford, Connecticut on January 8, 1721. He spent the greater part of his ministry serving at St James Parish Church in Jamaica, New York. Greatly admired by his contemporaries, Bostwick's life in the ministry was short lived subsequent of his poor health.

== Early life and family ==
David Bostick was born at New Milford., in 1721. Bostwisk's father was British major John Bostwick, who was a deacon. He was elected eighteen times (semi-annually) as a representative of the town to the General Assembly of the state. Bostwick's grandfather was John Bostwick, of Scotch ancestry, but lived in Cheshire, England, and emigrated to Stratford, Connecticut, in 1668, with his large family to New Milford, as one of its first settlers. David enrolled at Yale College, but left the university to complete his studies with Reverend Aaron Burr Sr. (Note: Burr was the father of the famous Aaron Burr, who won a duel with Alexander Hamilton.) at College of New Jersey (Note: Today known as Princeton University), then located in Newark, New Jersey, serving as his assistant in the academy. (Note: Accounts of Bostwick's attendance at Yale vary. Samuel Miller maintains that Bostwick had actually graduated Yale, and subsequently served as a teacher under the auspices of Reverend Burr.) The degree of Masters of Arts was conferred on Bostwick in 1756.

== Ministry ==
On April 14, 1756, Bostwick answered a call regarding the prospect in the ministry in New York. Shortly thereafter there was an outbreak of small pox to which Bostwick kept himself confined to his studies and sent his family back to Newark. After much consideration by the Presbytery of New York, who subsequently conferred with the Synod for final approval, Bostwick was ordained by the New York Presbytery on October 9, 1745, and installed as the pastor of the St James Parish Church in Jamaica, New York, on Long Island. The sermon preached at his ordination was delivered by Reverend Burr, (Note: i.e. "A Sermon Preached at the Ordination of the Reverend Mr. David Bostwick", delivered by Reverend Aaron Burr.) after which it was published at the request of the congregation who thought it was appropriate to archive and preserve. Bostwick was quite content serving the Jamaica church and accordingly rejected several calls for ministry at other churches. On October 9. 1745. Reverend Samuel Davies heard him preach before the synod in 1753, and said of him, "I think he has the best style of extempore preaching of any man I ever heard." His term as minister lasted about ten years.

Bostwick was part of a greater effort to bring Christianity to the Indian nations in central New York. His associations in this effort involved the Oneida Indian nation, who were requesting that a member of the clergy attend to them in ministry. Upon learning of this call Bostwick in 1761 corresponded with Samson Occom, a Native American who converted to Christianity, and became a minister, (Note: Occum was educated as a missionary under the direction of Eleazar Wheelock at Moor's Indian charity School in Lebanon, Connecticut.) informing him of the call for a minister. Occum was prevented from doing so, however, because of the French and Indian War which saw many natives ally with the British. Occum, however, remained neutral during that conflict and encouraged other tribes to do so by advocating peace.

Bostwick's health had begun to show signs of decline in 1760, but his condition was such that he was able to perform his duties in a minimal capacity. His efforts, however, proved to be increasingly arduous that by Autumn 1762 he was no longer able to discharge his pastoral duties. After struggling with what developed into a severe illness, lasting for several days, Bostwick died on November 12, 1763, at the age of forty-three. He was survived by his wife, four sons and six daughters.

Upon Bostwick's death in 1763 he was replaced by John Rodgers, where James Caldwell was chosen to deliver the Sermon at the ceremony for Rodgers' installation.

== Legacy ==
To commemorate Bostwick's ministry a sermon which he preached before the synod in 1758, Self Disclaimed and Christ Exalted, was reprinted printed at the Request of the Members of the Synod. It is said that as a preacher Bostwick was uncommonly popular as an extraordinary and gifted preacher. After his death, his treatise, entitled, "A Fair and Rational Vindication of the Right of Infants to the Ordinance of Baptism" was published in New York and reprinted in London.

== Works ==
Selected works

- Bostwick, David (1758). Self disclaimed, and Christ exalted: a sermon preached at Philadelphia, before the Reverend synod of New-York, May 25, 1758.
- Bostwick, David; Mather, Samuel.; Chauncy, Dr. (1763). An account of some late attempts by the correspondents of the Society for Propagating Christian Knowledge, to Christianize the North American Indians. Eidenburgh: The Society for Propagating Christian Knowledge.
- Bostwick, David (1766). A Fair and Rational Vindication of the Right of Infants to the Ordinance of Baptism. Lond, Gray & Alston.

== Bibliography ==
- Alexander, Samuel Davies (1887). The Presbytery of New York, 1738 to 1888. New York: A. D. F. Randolph and Co.
- Burr, Aaron (1745). "A Sermon Preached at the Ordination of the Reverend Mr. David Bostwick". Greenville Presbyterian Theological Society.
- Miller, Samuel (1813). Memoirs of the Rev. John Rodgers, D. D., late pastor of the Wall-street and Brick churches in the city of New-York. New York: Whiting and Watson, theological and classical booksellers. J. Seymour, printer.
- Nevin, Alfred (1884). Encyclopaedia of the Presbyterian church in the United States of America. Philadelphia: Presbyterian encyclopædia publishing co.
- Sprague, William (1858). Annals of the American Pulpit 1858. Vol. 3. New York: Robert Carter & Brothers. pp. 154–165.
- Strong, James; McClintock, John (1880). "David Bostwick". McClintock and Strong Biblical Cyclopedia. Haper and Brothers; NY.
- Webster, Richard, Reverend (1857). A History of the Presbyterian Church in America. Philadelphia: Joseph M. Wilson.
- Wigginton, Caroline (Winter 2008). "Extending Root and Branch: Community Regeneration in the Petitions of Samson Occom". Studies in American Indian Literatures, Series 2. 20 (4): 24–55. JSTOR 20737442.
