= The Caldwells =

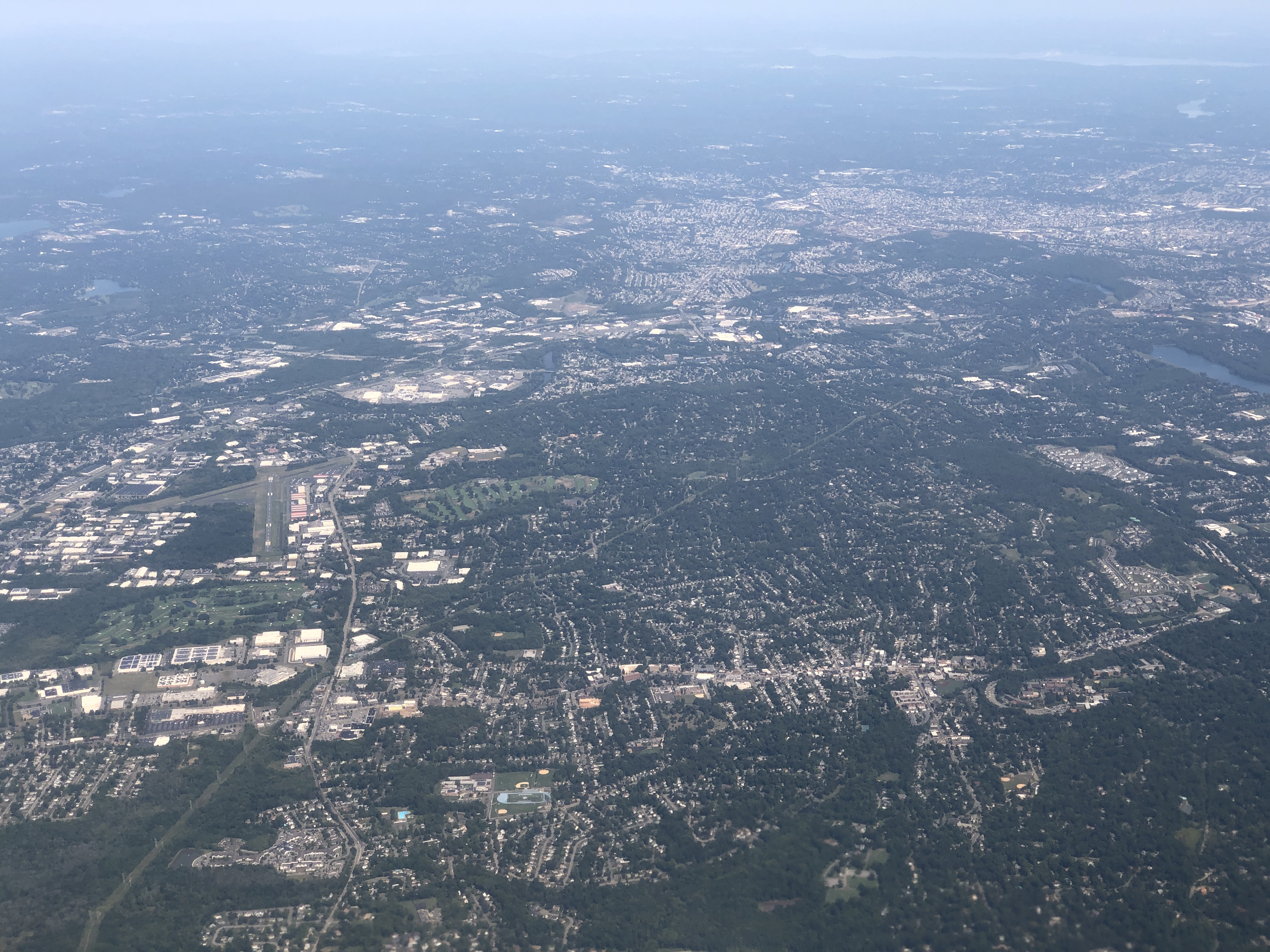
Aerial view of the Caldwells

The Caldwells are a group of three municipalities in Essex County, New Jersey, all of which have the word Caldwell in their name. All of these communities are named after the Reverend James Caldwell, a Patriot who played an active role supporting the Continental Army during the American Revolutionary War, most notably his actions at the Battle of Springfield, where he gave the soldiers pages from hymn books to use as wadding for their rifle bullets.

While each community has its own independent government, and the three municipalities have no shared governance (other than Essex County), the term is often used to refer to the area, including on highway exit signs. Signage for Exits 47B and 52 on Interstate 80 and Exit 5 on Interstate 280 refer to "The Caldwells" as a destination.

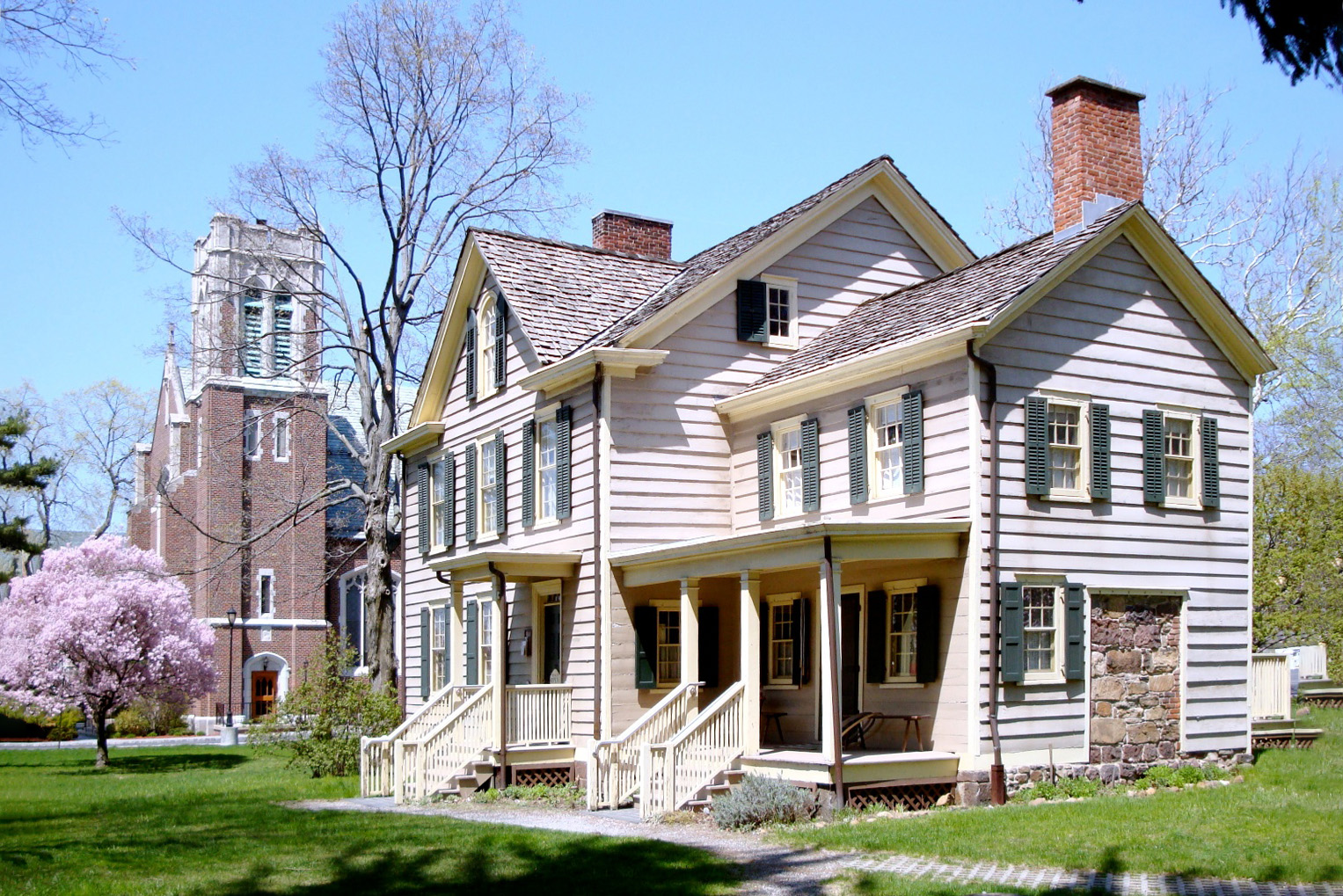
The Caldwell Presbyterian Church Manse, birthplace of President Grover Cleveland, in Caldwell

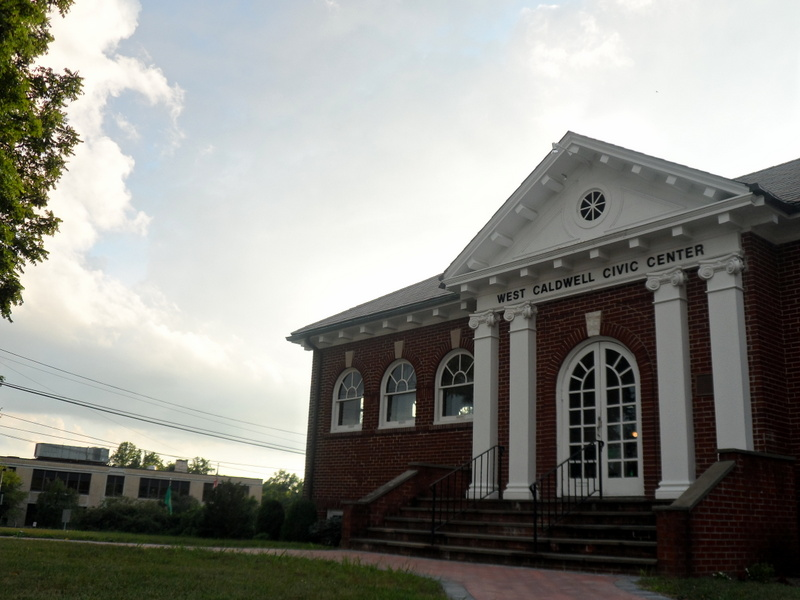
West Caldwell Civic Center

The three municipalities are:

- Caldwell
- North Caldwell
- West Caldwell

All three of the Caldwells were formed from what was known at the time as Caldwell Township that was incorporated by New Jersey in 1798: Caldwell incorporated (February 10, 1892), North Caldwell (March 31, 1898) and West Caldwell (February 24, 1904). The remainder of Caldwell Township was renamed Fairfield Township on November 6, 1963.

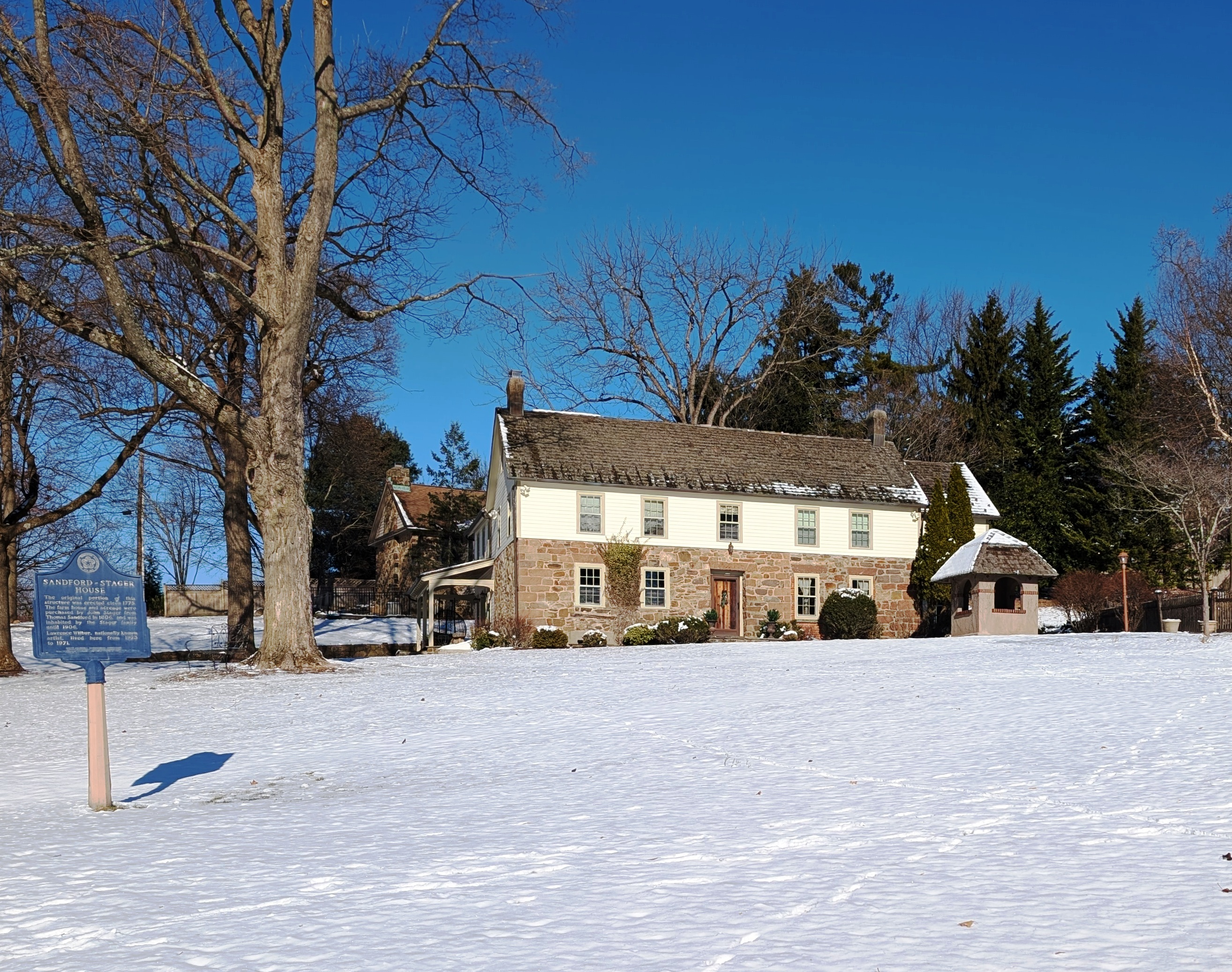
The Sandford-Stager House in North Caldwell

== See also ==
For other groups of similarly named municipalities in New Jersey, see:

- The Amboys
- The Brunswicks
- The Chathams
- The Oranges
- The Plainfields
- The Wildwoods
