= Poverty Beach =

Beach area in City of Cape May

Coordinates: 38°56′42″N 74°53′00″W

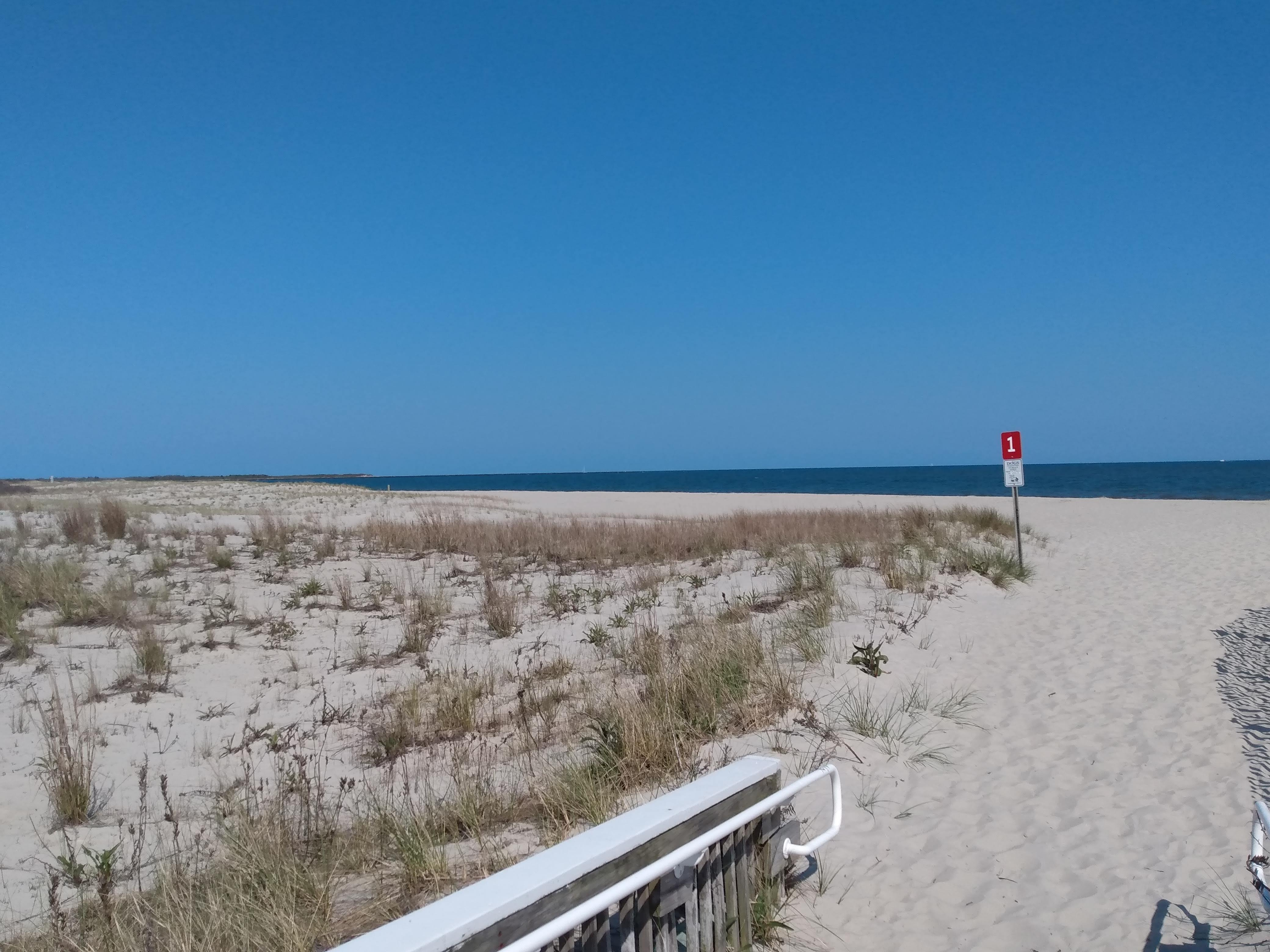
Poverty Beach

Poverty Beach or Sewell Point is a barrier spit, approximately 2.5 miles (4 km) in length entirely within the City of Cape May, along the Atlantic Ocean coast of eastern New Jersey in the United States. It is the southernmost barrier island in New Jersey.

== Description ==
Geologically, Poverty Beach is a sand spit or barrier spit, extending northeast from the mainland at Cape Island to Sewell Point at Cold Spring Inlet. Often the entire spit is referred to as Sewell Point. On its northwestern side, the peninsula encloses manmade Cape May Harbor.

Poverty Beach was described in 1834 as,

on the Atlantic ocean, immediately north of Cape May Island Lower t-ship, Cape May co., extends about three miles in length by half a mile in breadth.

An 1878 description stated,

It is bare and sandy stretching three miles southwestward to Cape May City, where it becomes continuous with the mainland. Its strand, between high and low water mark, is one of the finest drives on the New Jersey Coast.

Poverty Beach was widened by land reclamation involving the filling of Cape Island Sound and the creation of Cape May Harbor from salt marsh in the early 20th century.

Poverty Beach has been part of Cape May since 1848. Much of Poverty Beach is taken up by the United States Coast Guard Training Center Cape May.
