= The Amboys =

Pair of municipalities in Middlesex County, New Jersey

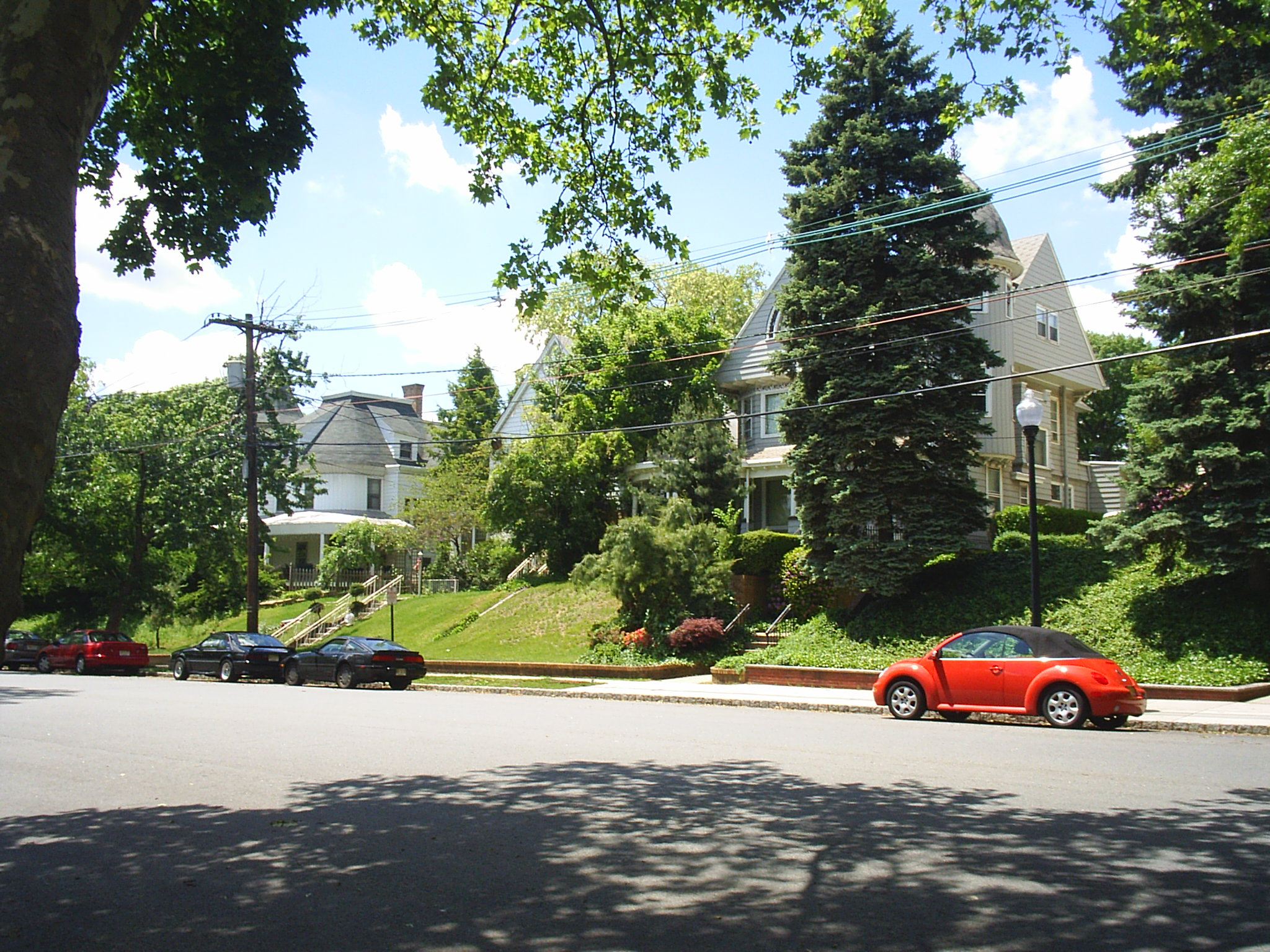
Historic Victorian homes in Perth Amboy

The Amboys are a pair of municipalities in Middlesex County, New Jersey, both of which have the word Amboy in their name. The two municipalities are the City of Perth Amboy and the City of South Amboy, located opposite each other on the Raritan Bay.

While each community has its own independent government, and the two municipalities have no shared governance (other than Middlesex County), the term is often used to refer to the area, including on highway exit signs: signs for exit 30 on Route 18 northbound refer to "The Amboys" as a destination.

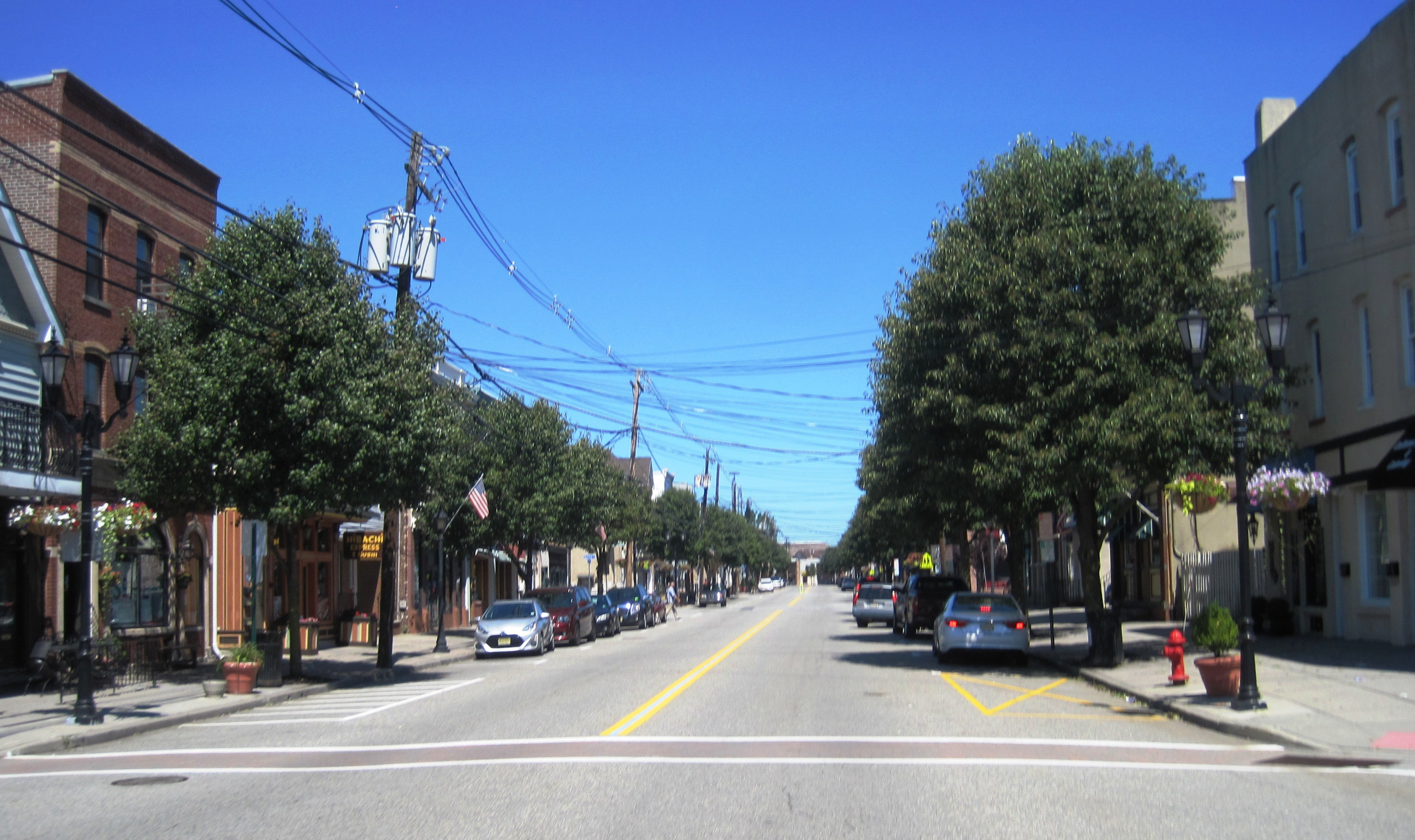
Downtown South Amboy

== Source for Amboy ==
Perth Amboy's history dates back to 1651, when August Herman bought a point of land from the Lenni Lenape Native Americans. The land, which was called "Ompoge" by the indigenous people, gradually changed its name to "Emboyle", then "Amboyle". When the city was incorporated in 1683, settlers began to call the land "Ambo" or "Amboy Point", and finally "Amboy". The name means "place resembling a bowl".

In 1686, when the settlement became the capital of East Jersey, Perth was added to the name in honor of one of the Proprietors under the Royal grant, the James Drummond, 1st Duke of Perth.

== See also ==
For other groups of similarly named municipalities in New Jersey, see:

- The Brunswicks
- The Caldwells
- The Chathams
- The Oranges
- The Plainfields
- The Wildwoods
