= King Nummy =

King Nummy (also Nummie and Thomas Nummie) was a chief of the Kechemeche, a subdivision of the Lenni Lenape that lived in modern Southern New Jersey, and at the time part of the English Province of New Jersey. He was the last relevant leader of the group; by the time of Nummy's death, the Kechemeche had largely either migrated westward, integrated into colonial society, operated as independents, or perished.

== Biography ==
Nummy's life is not well documented; what little is known about him is what was written about him by the colonial settlers of New Sweden and New Jersey, rather than the Lenape themselves. The closest chroniclers were Presbyterian missionaries to the Lenape.

What is documented is that Nummy acted as a peace broker and trader, a contact between the European settlers and the Lenape. Some sources indicate he was a chief of all the Unalachtigo branch of the Lenape rather than merely of the Kechemeche, although European settlers routinely overestimated the sway of leaders willing to work with them in American Indian - colonist relations, so this belief may not have been well-grounded. Nummy presented a "Cape May Diamond" to Christopher Leaming as a token of friendship. Nummy also sold a whale to Evan Davis in 1685. Nummy had a sister, Snowflower, and according to some traditions, she married an English missionary named Benijah Thompson.

It is not known where Nummy died. Most legends believe that he stayed in Southern New Jersey rather than head west as many other Lenape did, though. He is thought to have stayed to care for the children of his sister after she died of illness. According to one tradition, he may have been buried on Nummy Island, a small island between North Wildwood and Stone Harbor in the Jenkins Sound, near Hereford Inlet. At least one author, Charles Tomlin writing in 1913, considers this alleged burial location unlikely, however.

== Legacy ==
Several areas in New Jersey are named after Nummy, largely in modern Middle Township: Nummy Island (see above), Nummy Lake in Belleplain State Forest, a place called Nummytown, a trail into Wildwood called King Nummy Trail or simply the Indian Trail, and Nummy Campground.
