= The Plainfields =

Three municipalities of New Jersey

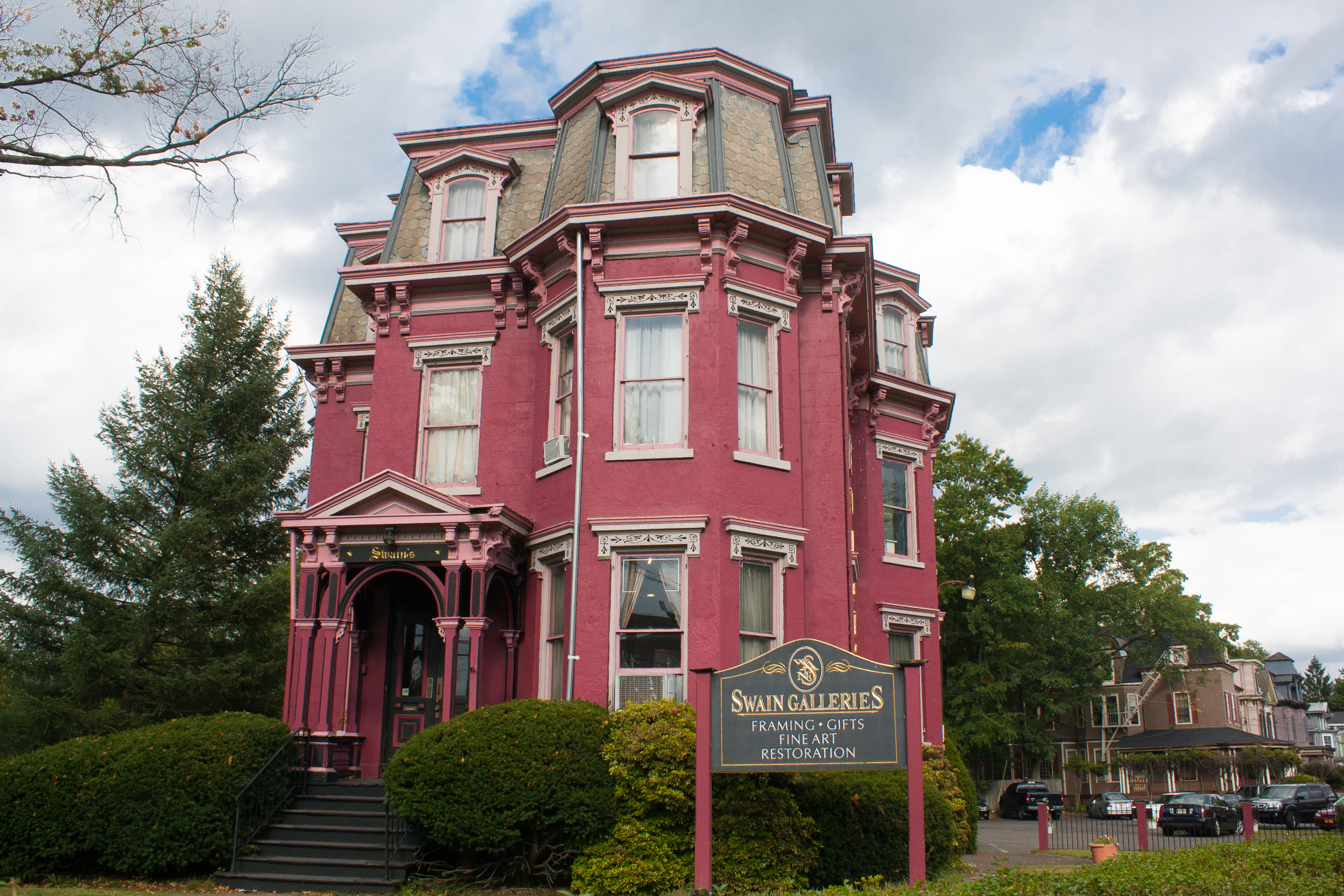
The Crescent Area Historic District, an historic neighborhood featuring Victorian homes in Plainfield

The Plainfields are a group of three municipalities spanning the convergence of Somerset, Union, and Middlesex Counties in central New Jersey, all of which have the word "Plainfield" in their name. They are the Borough of North Plainfield (Somerset County), City of Plainfield (Union County), and the Borough of South Plainfield (Middlesex County). The aforementioned "Plainfield" towns, along with the town of Scotch Plains, derived their name from a local estate located in the region, and for its scenic location. However, it is not certain whether the name "Plainfield", specifically, is directly derived from the plain clothing that was worn by its founders, or if it is a reference to the overall landscape. The town of Fanwood is located nearby.

The region was part of the colonial era Elizabethtown Tract. It was later part of the municipality of Piscataway, which was settled by English and Scottish Quakers from New England in the late 16th and early 17th centuries. Among them, was John Laing, whose holdings were known as Plainfield Plantation.

While each community has its own independent government, and the three municipalities have no shared governance even at the county level, the term is often used to refer to the area, including on highway exit signs. Signage for Exit 40 on Interstate 78, for example, refers to "The Plainfields" as a destination.

== See also ==
For other groups of similarly named municipalities in New Jersey, see:

- The Amboys
- The Brunswicks
- The Caldwells
- The Chathams
- The Oranges
- The Wildwoods
