= The Oranges =

Four municipalities in New Jersey, U.S.

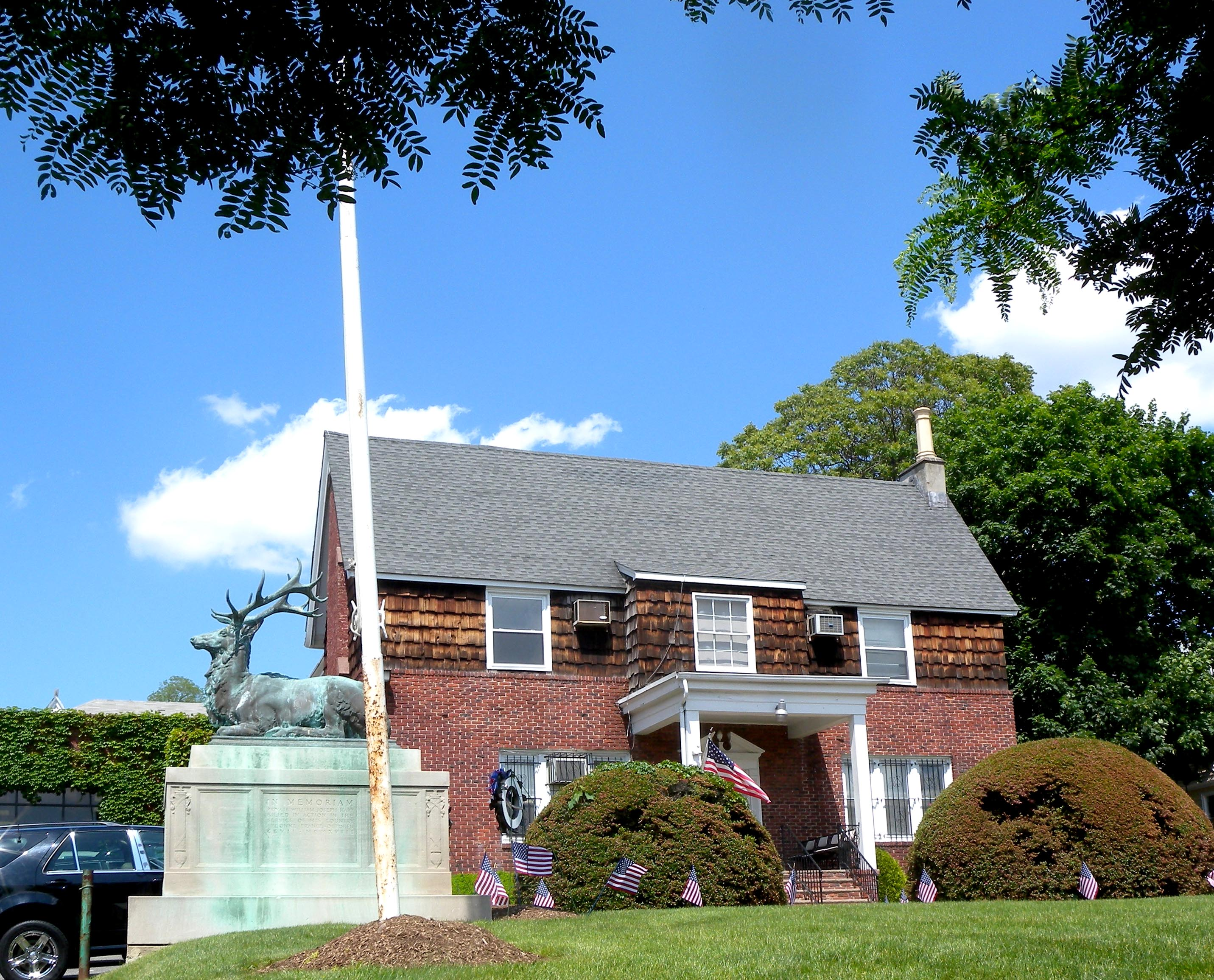
Elks Lodge of The Oranges

The Oranges (locally /ˈɑːrəndʒɪz/) are a group of four municipalities in Essex County, New Jersey, all of which have the word Orange in their name. The four municipalities are Orange, East Orange, South Orange and West Orange. All of these communities were named for William III of Orange, Stadtholder of the Dutch Republic, and from 1689 until 1702 King of England, Ireland, and Scotland.

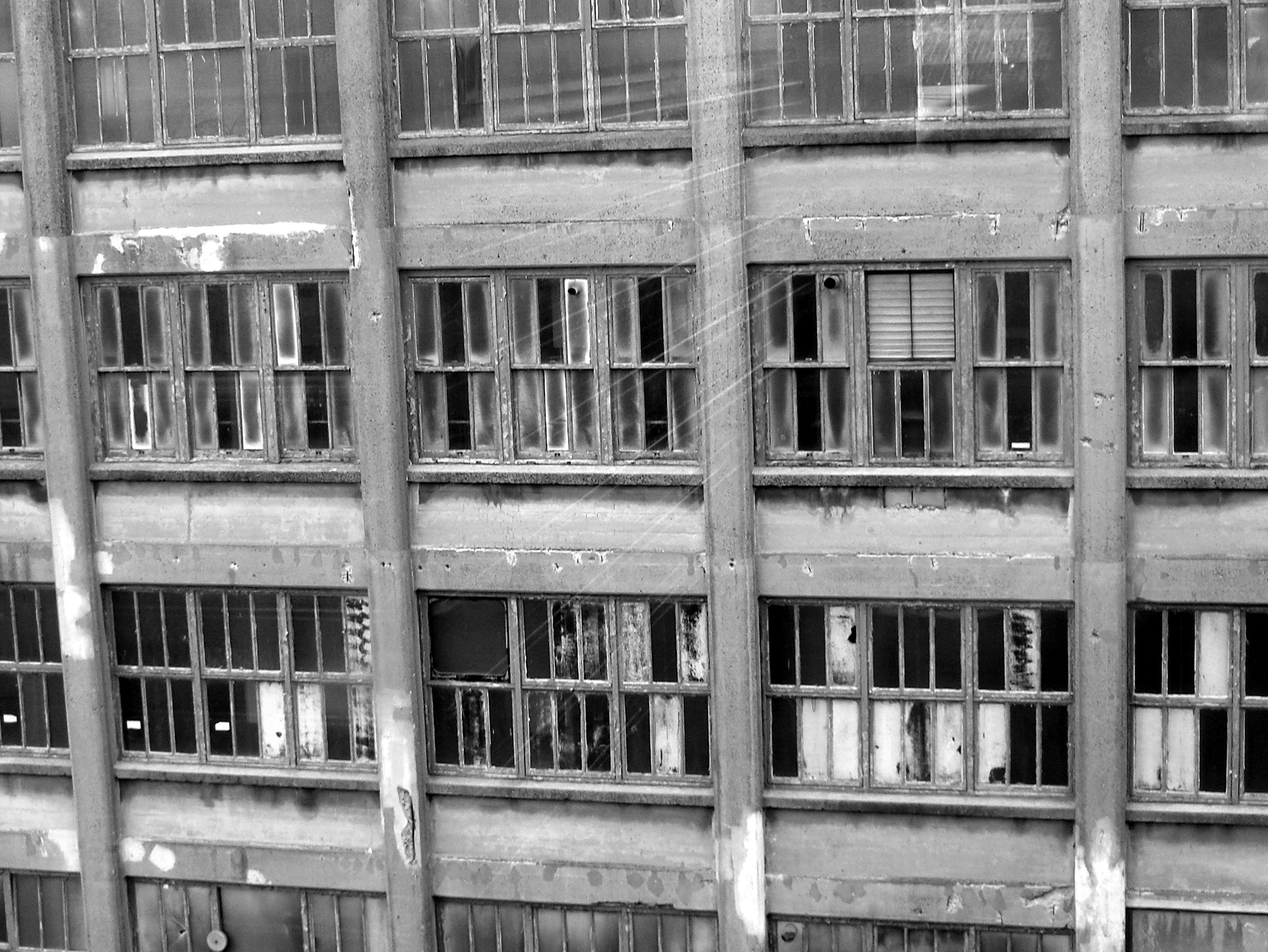
The Thomas Edison factory in West Orange. It has since been converted into apartments.

Orange was initially a part of Newark, but it was originally known as "Newark Mountains". On June 7, 1780, the townspeople of Newark Mountains officially voted to adopt the name Orange. At the time, there was a significant number of people in favor of secession from Newark. However, this would not occur until November 27, 1806, when the township of Orange—then including all of the territory encompassing all of the Oranges—officially separated from Newark. Orange was incorporated as a town on January 31, 1860. Almost immediately, it began fragmenting into smaller communities, primarily because of local disputes about the costs of establishing paid police, fire, and street departments. South Orange was organized on January 26, 1861, Fairmount (later to become part of West Orange) on March 11, 1862, East Orange on March 4, 1863, and West Orange (including Fairmount) on March 14, 1863.

Today, the different municipalities of the Oranges are quite different from one another. All four were once among the richest communities in New Jersey. However, Orange and East Orange are relatively urban and working-class, while South Orange and West Orange remain affluent suburban enclaves. In addition, the residents of Orange and East Orange are predominantly African-American, while those of South Orange and West Orange are predominantly white.

While each community has its own independent government, and the four municipalities have no shared governance (other than Essex County), the term is often used to refer to the area, including on highway exit signs. Signage for Exit 47A on Interstate 80 and exit 145 on the Garden State Parkway refer to "The Oranges" as a destination. Interstate 280 refers to "The Oranges" as a control city as it passes directly through three out of the four municipalities (except South Orange, which is nearby).

== See also ==
For other groups of similarly named municipalities in New Jersey, see:

- The Amboys
- The Brunswicks
- The Caldwells
- The Chathams
- The Plainfields
- The Wildwoods
