= Cape May Inlet =

Inlet in Cape May County, New Jersey

Coordinates: 38°56′20″N 74°52′09″W

Cape May Inlet (formerly Cold Spring Inlet) is an inlet in southeastern Cape May County, New Jersey.

== Geography ==
Cape May Inlet is 1 mile (1.6 km) long and connects Cape May Harbor with the Atlantic Ocean, and separates Two Mile Beach to the northeast from Poverty Beach to the southwest. It is 2.5 miles (4.0 km) northeast of the City of Cape May. The United States Coast Guard Training Center Cape May is located on the southwest shore of Cape May Inlet.

It was described in 1834 as,

Cold Spring Inlet, Lower t-ship, Cape May co., between Two Mile Beach and Poverty Beach, upon the Atlantic sea-board. It is less than half a mile in width. It has its name from a spring about 3 or 4 miles inland, which sends its tribute to the ocean by this passage.

Cold Spring Inlet was described in 1878, viz.,

Cold Spring Inlet, at the south end of this beach, leads to Jarvis Sound and Cape Island channel and creek. It is navigable for vessels of small tonnage only, and for these only at high water. Its navigation is difficult, and attended with danger, yet it is the commercial highway to the growing and enterprising city of Cape May.

== History ==
Cold Spring Inlet appears on maps as early as 1700, and as "Cold Spring" the inlet is labeled on a map published in 1749 by Lewis Evans. Cold Spring Inlet had been named for the local community of Cold Spring, and its eponymous spring. In time, it became associated with the City of Cape May after the city became the center of development in the area. With the creation of Cape May Harbor, the inlet was considered a part of that body of water, but began to be referred to locally as "Cape May Inlet". On April 9, 1987 the United States Board on Geographic Names approved the naming of the inlet as "Cape May Inlet".

== See also ==
- Two Mile Beach
- Poverty Beach
