= The Brunswicks =

Group of municipalities with 'Brunswick' in their name in New Jersey, USA

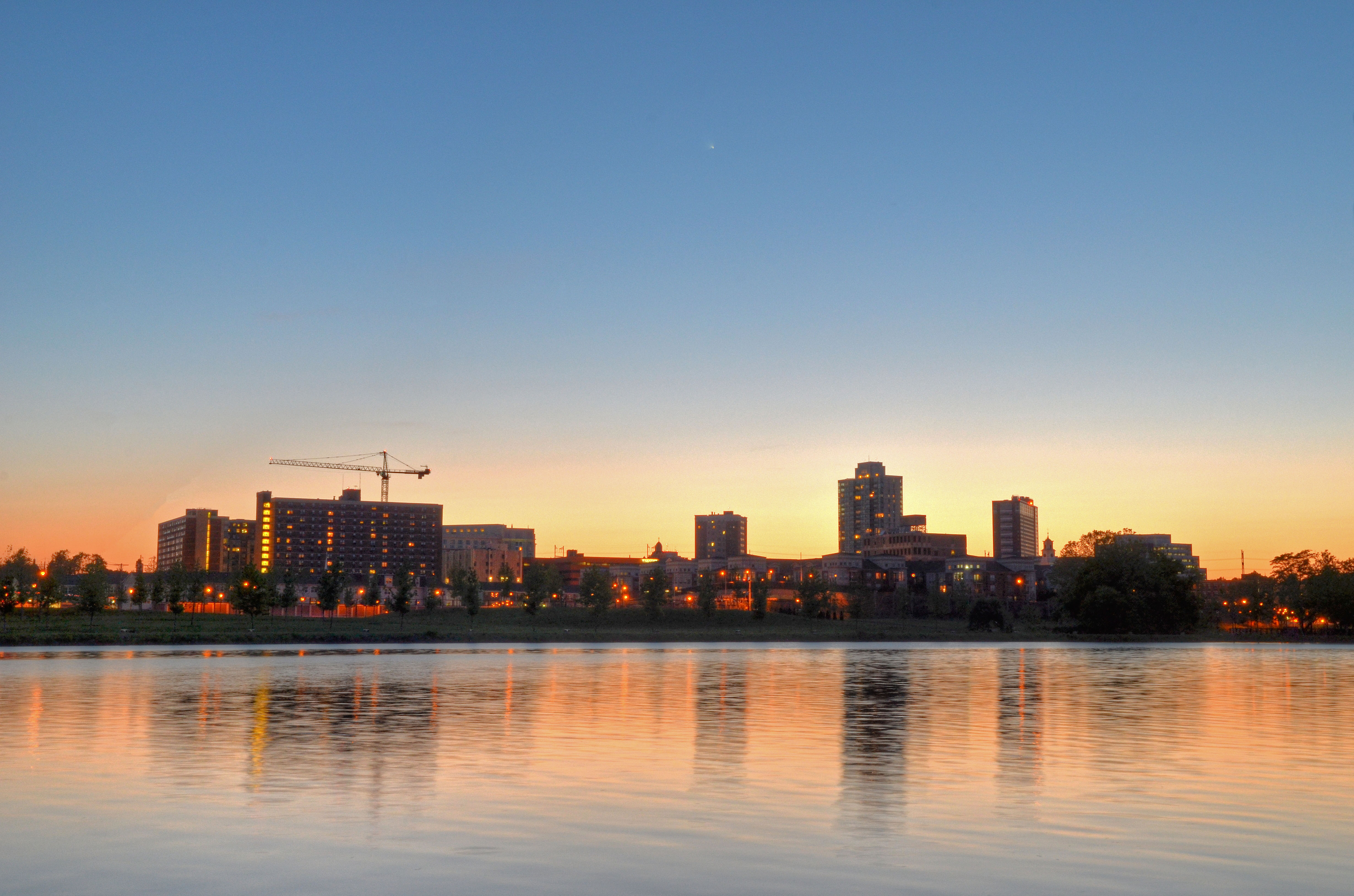
Skyline of New Brunswick, seen from the Raritan river

The Brunswicks are a group of four municipalities in Middlesex County, New Jersey, all of which have the word Brunswick in their name. New Brunswick, New Jersey, the first formed of the four, was named in 1730 after the British royal House of Brunswick. The name is also attributed to the German city of Braunschweig, formerly translated in English as Brunswick

While each community has its own independent government, and the four municipalities have no shared governance (other than Middlesex County), the term is often used to refer to the area.

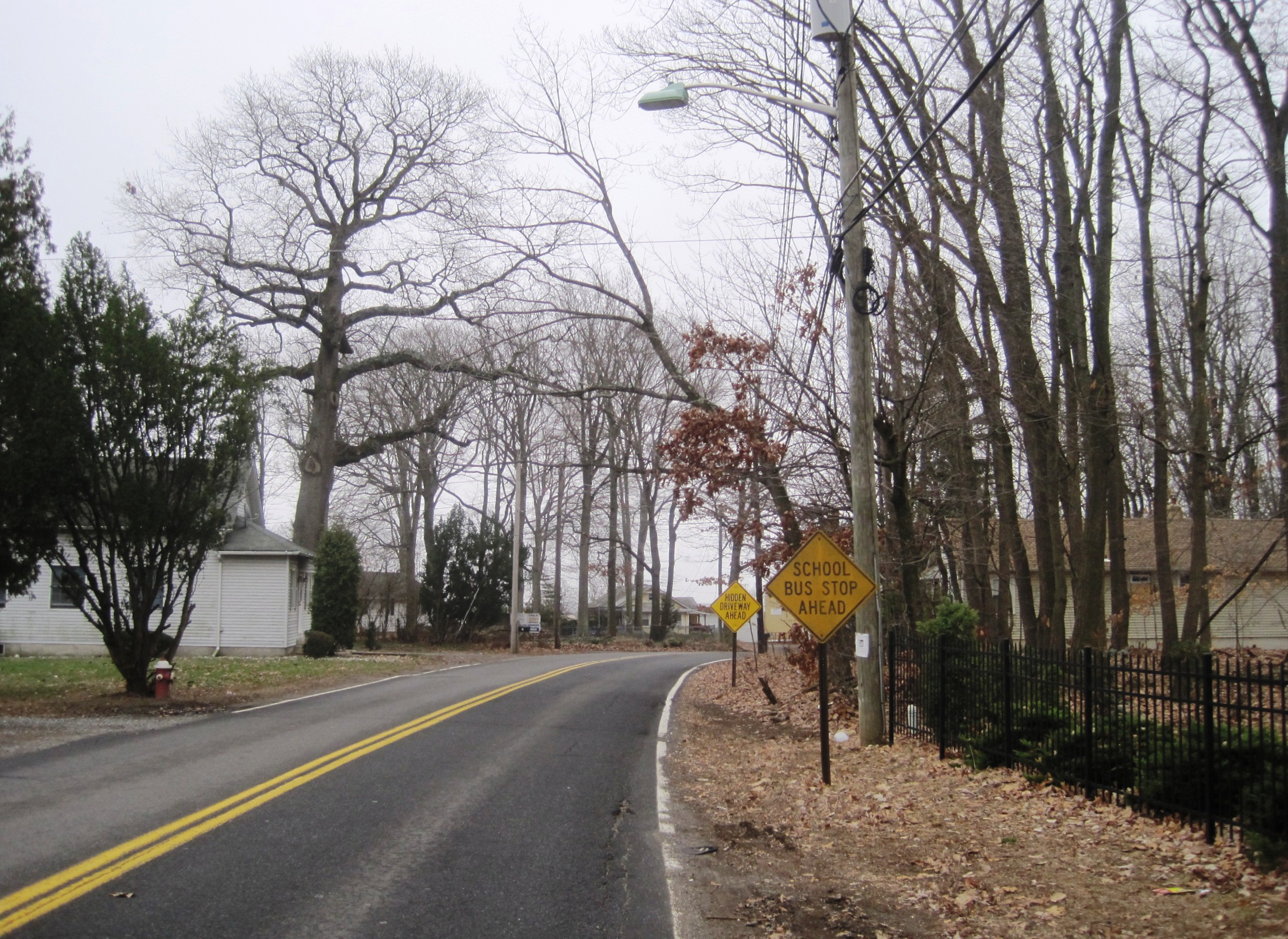
Sand Hills, an unincorporated community of South Brunswick

== Municipalities ==
The four municipalities are:

- East Brunswick (Township) - population of 47,152
- New Brunswick (City) - 55,181
- North Brunswick (Township) - 40,742
- South Brunswick (Township) - 43,147

as of the 2010 census

White:

- East Brunswick: 69.36%
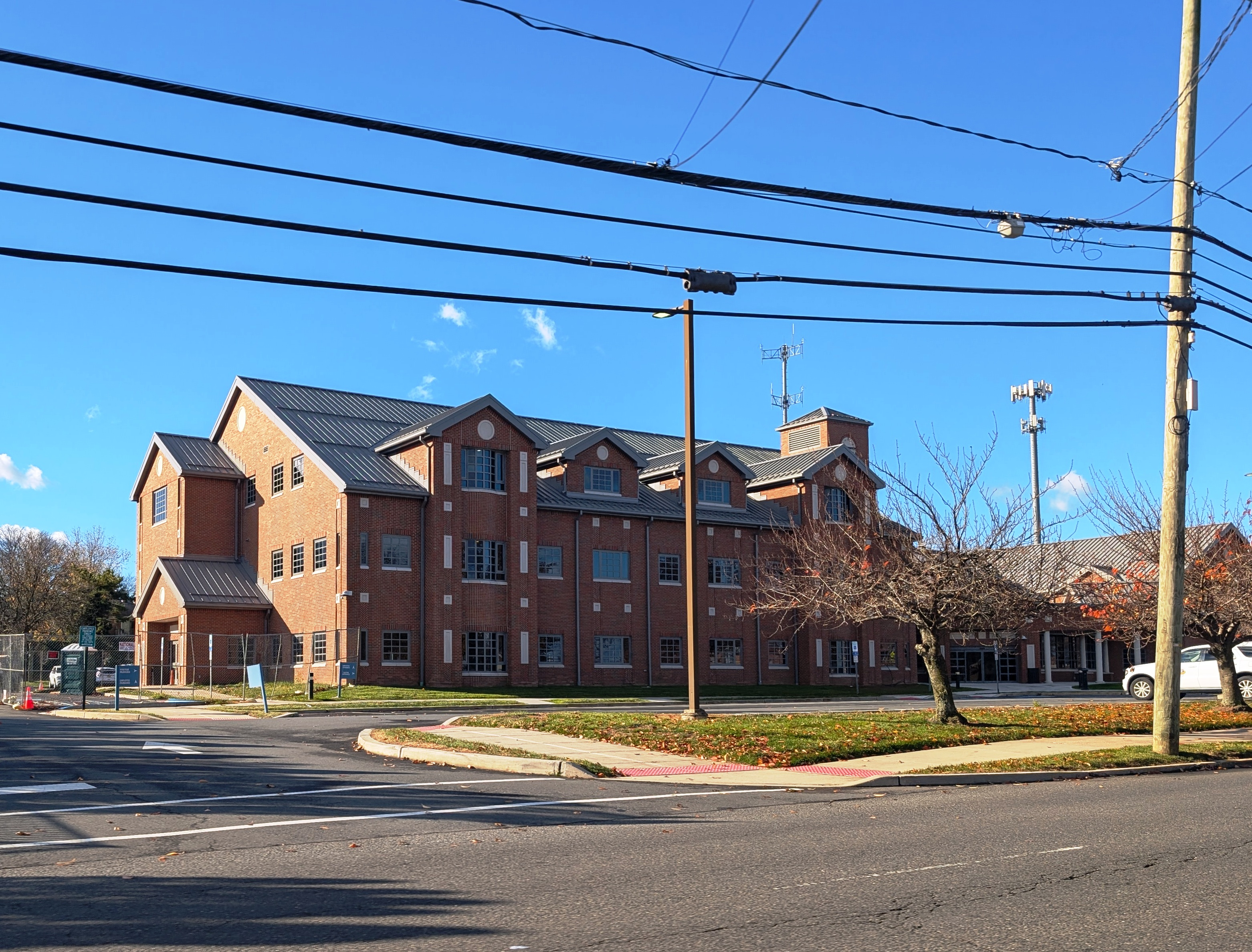
- Municipal building of North Brunswick
  New Brunswick: 48.79%
- North Brunswick: 62.73%
- South Brunswick: 52.10%

Black/African American:

- East Brunswick: 3.98%
- New Brunswick: 23.03%
- North Brunswick: 15.27%
- South Brunswick: 7.70%

Native American:

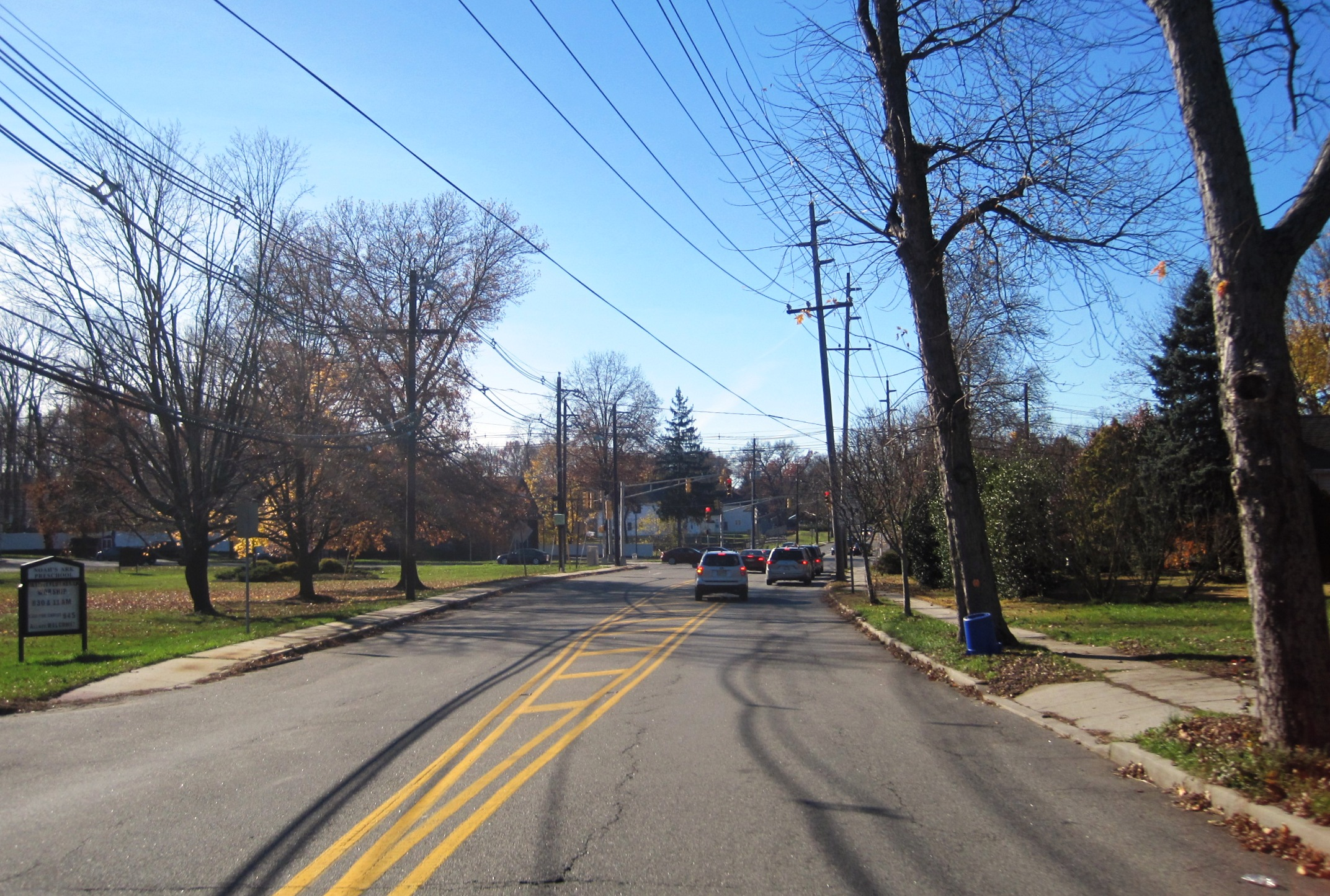
- Dunhams Corners, an unincorporated community within East Brunswick
  East Brunswick: 0.10%
- New Brunswick: 0.46%
- North Brunswick: 0.17%
- South Brunswick: 0.20%

Asian:

- East Brunswick: 22.80% (primarily of Chinese, Korean, or Japanese descent)
- New Brunswick: 5.32%
- North Brunswick: 14.20%
- South Brunswick: 35.90% (primarily of Indian, or Sri Lankan descent)

Other race:

- East Brunswick: 1.68%
- New Brunswick: 18.08%
- North Brunswick: 4.70%
- South Brunswick: 1.50%

Hispanic/Latino:

- East Brunswick: 6.70%
- New Brunswick: 39.01% (primarily of Puerto Rican, Mexican, and Dominican descent)
- North Brunswick: 10.40%
- South Brunswick: 6.00%

Population increase from 2000 to 2010:

- East Brunswick: 1.6%
- New Brunswick: 13.6%
- North Brunswick: 12.3%
- South Brunswick: 15.1%

Median family income:

- East Brunswick: $113,863 (2011)
- New Brunswick: $54,880 (2010)
- North Brunswick: $87,647 (2011)
- South Brunswick: $113,875 (2011)

== History ==
New Brunswick was formed by royal charter on December 30, 1730, within other townships in Middlesex County and Somerset County, and was reformed by royal charter with the same boundaries on February 12, 1763, at which time it was divided into north and south wards. New Brunswick was incorporated as a city by an Act of the New Jersey Legislature on September 1, 1784.

Both North and South Brunswick were first mentioned in minutes of the Middlesex County Board of Chosen Freeholders dated February 28, 1779. North Brunswick Township, covering the area "Northward of New Brunswick", and South Brunswick Township to the south, were both incorporated as part of New Jersey's initial group of 104 townships by an Act of the legislature on February 21, 1798.

East Brunswick Township was incorporated by an Act of the legislature on February 28, 1860, from portions of both Monroe Township and North Brunswick Township.

== See also ==
For other groups of similarly named municipalities in New Jersey, see:

- The Amboys
- The Caldwells
- The Chathams
- The Oranges
- The Plainfields
- The Wildwoods
