= Hereford Inlet =

Inlet in Cape May County, New Jersey

Coordinates: 39°00′55″N 74°47′13″W

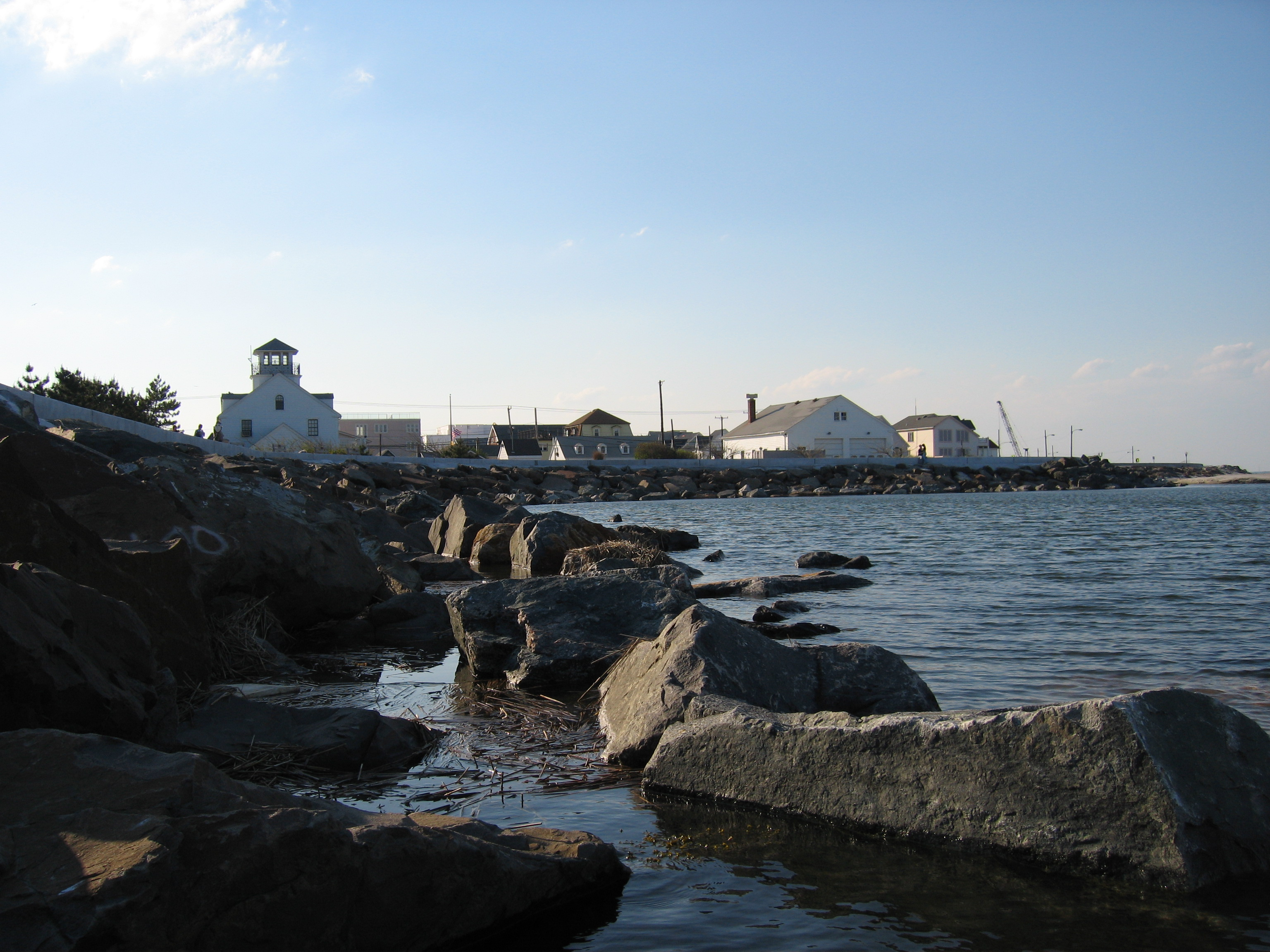
Hereford Inlet with the Hereford Inlet Lighthouse (tallest structure in view) at an elevation in North Wildwood, New Jersey

Hereford Inlet is an inlet in Cape May County, New Jersey, United States, adjacent to North Wildwood, New Jersey.

== Geography ==
Hereford Inlet separates Seven Mile Island from Five Mile Beach.

It was described in 1834 as,

Hereford Inlet, Middle t-ship, Cape May co., a passage of between one and two miles wide, between Leaming's and Five Mile beach, through which the sea enters the lagunes and marshes upon the Atlantic coast.

Hereford Inlet was described in 1878, viz.,

Hereford Inlet bounds this island on its south end. This inlet is a mile wide, and has seven feet of water on its bar. Fine fishing is found in the neighboring channels. Jenkins and Leaming's Sounds discharge through it, and Nummy's Island lies directly in front of it.

== History ==
Hereford Inlet is labeled as Little Hereford on a circa 1700 map by John Thornton, and by its modern name on a map published in 1749 by Lewis Evans. The Hereford Inlet Light is a historic lighthouse located in North Wildwood, on the southwestern shore of Hereford Inlet at the north end of Five Mile Beach. Its construction was completed and it became operational in 1874.

Nummy Island, one of the islands near the inlet, is named after Lenape leader King Nummy due to a likely apocryphal tale that Nummy was buried there.

== See also ==
- Seven Mile Island
- Five Mile Beach
