= James Caldwell (clergyman) =

American Presbyterian minister and revolutionary (1734–1781)

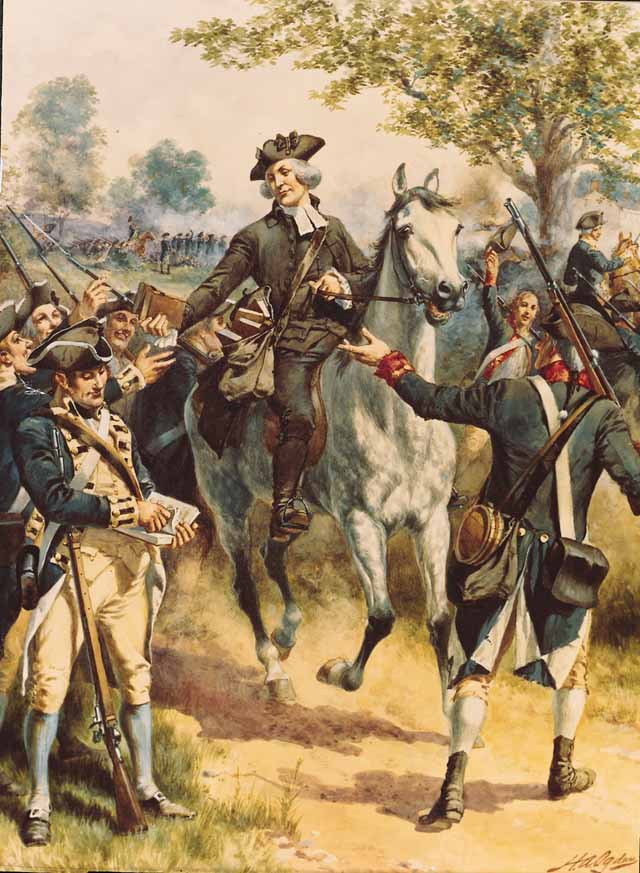
- Caldwell at the Battle of Springfield
- Born: April 1734; Charlotte County, Province of Virginia
- Died: November 24, 1781 (aged 47); Elizabethtown, New Jersey, United States
- Burial place: First Presbyterian Church of Elizabeth
- Occupation: Clergyman
- Spouse: Hannah Ogden
- Children: 9 children
- Parent(s): John Caldwell and Margaret Caldwell

James Caldwell (April 1734 – November 24, 1781) was a Presbyterian minister and a Chaplain in the Continental Army He fought at the Battle of Springfield and played a prominent part in the American Revolution, and subsequently was often referred to as the "Fighting Parson". As a passionate supporter of independence and an outspoken minister who criticized King George III in his sermons, and in public, the King placed a bounty on Caldwell's head. During the Revolution both Caldwall and his wife were murdered in New Jersey some two weeks apart.

== Early life and family ==
Caldwell was born in Cub Creek in Charlotte County, Province of Virginia, the seventh son of John and Margaret Caldwell, who were Scots-Irish settlers, and traced their ancestry to Huguenots who fled France to Scotland in the 16th century, established Caldwell Castle and later defended the Ulster Plantation and Derry.

James Caldwell graduated from the College of New Jersey (later called Princeton University) in 1759 (Note: Reverend Samuel Davies was serving as the college's first president at this time.) and, although he inherited 500 acres (2.0 km^{2}) of land in Cub Creek, chose to become pastor of the Presbyterian Church in Elizabethtown, New Jersey.

== Early ministry ==
On July 29, 1760 Caldwell obtained his license to preach by the Presbytery of New Brunswick, and was subsequently ordained on the September 17 therein. After preaching for a time in the Carolinas, he accepted a call to the Presbyterian Church of Elizabethtown (now Elizabeth), New Jersey, and was installed in March, 1762, at a annual salary of one hundred and sixty pounds.

In 1765, John Rodgers was called to New York to fill the vacancy subsequent of the unexpected death of Reverend David Bostwick, where Caldwell was chosen to deliver the Sermon at Rodgers' installation.

== American Revolution ==
During the American Revolution Caldwell was an active partisan on the side of the Patriots, and was known as the "Fighting Parson". (Note: Caldwell earned the nickname "the Fighting Parson" because of his aid to Washington's men as they battled in various parts of Horseneck.) His church and his house were burned by Loyalists in 1780. Accordingly, the Loyalists in New Jersery are said to have had a hatred for Caldwell second to no other patriot in that State.

Caldwell served as a Chaplain and Assistant Deputy Quartermaster-General in the 3rd New Jersey Battalion of the Continental Army from 1776-1781. While he was stationed with the army in Morristown, his wife Hannah was shot and killed by a British light infantryman under disputed circumstances during the Battle of Connecticut Farms in what is now Union Township, an act which Union County immortalizes on their county seal to this day. His wife had been at home with their baby and a 3 year old toddler. As British forces moved into the Connecticut Farms, Hannah Caldwell was shot through a window as she sat with her children on a bed.

Caldwell, who fought in the Battle of Springfield, was killed on November 24, 1781, by a sentry in Elizabethtown, New Jersey, when he refused to have a package inspected. The sentry, James Morgan, was hanged for murder on January 29, 1782, in Westfield, New Jersey, amid rumors that he was a traitor and was easily bribed to kill the chaplain. Their nine orphaned children were raised by the family's friends.

Caldwell and his wife were buried in the churchyard of the First Presbyterian Church in Elizabethtown. A monument to him in Elizabeth, New Jersey was dedicated in 1846.

== Legacy ==
- A monument to Caldwell in Elizabeth, New Jersey was dedicated in 1846.
- Three towns in New Jersey, known collectively as The Caldwells are named for James Caldwell. They were all part of the original Caldwell Township (whose name was changed to Fairfield Township following a 1963 local referendum) : Caldwell; North Caldwell; West Caldwell.
  Schools : James Caldwell High School ; James Caldwell Elementary School, Caldwell University (formerly Caldwell College)

== Bibliography ==
- Alden, Edmund Kimball (1936). "James Caldwell,". Dictionary of American Biography. Vol. . iii. Scribner's Sons. p. 408-409.
- Fleming, Thomas J. (1973). The forgotten victory; the battle for New Jersey--1780. Reader's Digest Press; distributed by Dutton.
- Ford, Harry P. (September 1912). "A Revolutionary Hero: James Caldwell". Journal of the Presbyterian Historical Society (1901-1930). 6 (7). JSTOR 23323052.
- Kempshall, Everard (1880). Caldwell and the Revolution : a historical sketch of the First Presbyterian Church of Elizabeth. Elizabeth, N.J.: Elizabeth Daily Journal.
- Nevin, Alfred (1884). Encyclopaedia of the Presbyterian church in the United States of America. Philadelphia: Presbyterian encyclopædia publishing co.
- Sprague, William (1858). Annals of the American Pulpit 1858. Vol. 3. New York: Robert Carter & Brothers. pp. 154–165.
- Weis, Frederick Lewis (1957). The Colonial Clergy of the Middle Colonies: New York, New Jersey, and Pennsylvania 1628-1776. American Antiquarian Society.

Online sources

- "James Caldwell". Lost Pine <inistries.
- "History of West Caldwell". The Township of West Caldwell, NJ..
