= Kechemeche =

The Kechemeche were a Lenni Lenape tribe of Native Americans that lived in the area generally known today as the southern portion of Cape May County, New Jersey, an area bounded on one side by the Atlantic Ocean and the Delaware Bay on the other.

The Kechemeche were first encountered in approximately the year 1600 by European colonists who found the natives to be generally friendly and cooperative. By 1735 the Kechemeche were no longer a viable population, through losses from illness and disease, from being absorbed into the occupying colonial population, and by settling elsewhere, including joining other tribes.

Eventually, remaining Kechemeche were relocated to Oklahoma by the U.S. government, along with other Lenape (Delaware) tribes, where their descendants remain to this day.

== Life ==
The colonial settlers described the Kechemeche as a robust, healthy people, who hunted and grew crops, such as corn, squash, and beans. In Kechemeche society, women did the growing of crops, the cooking and other household and child-rearing chores, while the men were generally responsible for maintaining security and for providing meat for their families through hunting. Since the tribe was located so close to the shores of the Atlantic Ocean and the Delaware Bay, the netting and trapping of fish and clamming formed part of their occupation.

Deer and small game were plentiful in the local pine forests, and the Kechemeche hunters would trap and kill the deer by setting fires to the underbrush to drive the deer into pre-arranged traps, where they would be killed and used as fresh meat or preserved through smoking or salting. Also, the deer carcass provided other products such as leather, horns, and so on.

The Kechemeche lived in villages consisting of wigwams, as opposed to teepees. If the village was large enough it could contain a wooden longhouse and even defensive palisades. During leisure hours, tribe members performed beading and weaving, creating products which could be used in trade with other tribes. They also created wampum out of white and purple shell beads, and used the wampum for trading. Since the Kechemeche had access to the Delaware River, they often traveled the river in their bark and dugout canoes in order to trade and communicate with other tribes. Trails led throughout the area, and in the northern part of what is now a county the Kechemeche gathered tuckahoe, a type of root, which they converted into a substance that served as flour.

Visiting other tribes, some distant, was important for the Kechemeche, since story telling was an important element of entertainment in the Kechemeche lifestyle. Because of the tribe's isolation and lack of a written historical or contemporary record, news or gossip of happenings in other tribes, as well as tales of their own ancestors, was always welcomed by all members of the tribe.

Kechemeche men wore minimal headdress, with perhaps some beads and only a feather or two. The women wore their hair in braids and wore knee-length skirts. Men wore deerskin breechcloth and leggings, but did not generally cover their chests, which, in many cases, were adorned with tattoos. In cold weather, men would cover their chests with deerskin capes. Both sexes wore deerskin moccasins. Warriors shaved their head or wore what would now be considered a "mohawk" haircut. In times of conflict, a warrior employed bow and arrow, war club, and often a shield.

Since the Kechemeche lived close to the shores of Delaware Bay, they collected what are now known as "Cape May diamonds," or tumbled quartz, along the beaches. These they considered to have supernatural powers and used them for trading with other tribes, as well as with European settlers.

Colonial settlers were eager to trade with the Kechemeche, who provided valuable pelts of beaver, deer, bear and otter in exchange for common European products such as beads, bottles, cook ware, guns, and knives.

The Kechemeche, like other members of the Lenni Lenape, believed that land was to be used, not owned, which created a philosophical conflict, as well as misunderstandings, between the Kechemeche and the settlers. In addition, the Kechemeche generally required approximately one square mile for hunting and for providing meat for a family unit. As a result, growth of colonial area eventually caused sufficient conflict that various treaties were found necessary in order to come to final agreement on land use. Despite these treaties, Kechemeche influence waned as colonial ventures such as New Sweden, New Netherland, and the English Province of New Jersey continued to grow. The last Kechemeche leader in their traditional lands that the European colonists recorded was King Nummy, who died sometime from 1700–1730. Most Kechemeche eventually migrated westward to area in what is now Pennsylvania and Ohio; remnants would eventually be sent to the Indian Territory much later.

== Lineage ==
The Kechemeche were a tribe in the Lenape group, later named the Delaware by some historians. The Lenape nation consisted of three major divisions, or clans:

- the Took-seat, which meant Wolf, or Round Paw, also known as the Munsee, and which settled in North New Jersey and Southern New York.
- the Pokekooungo, which meant Turtle, or Crawling, also known as the northern Unami, and populated Central New Jersey and parts of Pennsylvania.
- the Pullaook, which meant Turkey, or Non-Chewing, also known as the southern Unami, which settled in South New Jersey.
- A fourth clan evolved, but broke up and was absorbed by the other three.

The Kechemeche were part of the Pullaook (Turkey) clan, which reported to the Lenape subchief, termed "sakima," who resided in the Trenton area.

== Language ==
The Kechemeche spoke the Unami dialect of the Delaware languages.
