= Turtle Gut Inlet =

Former inlet at Wildwood Crest, New Jersey

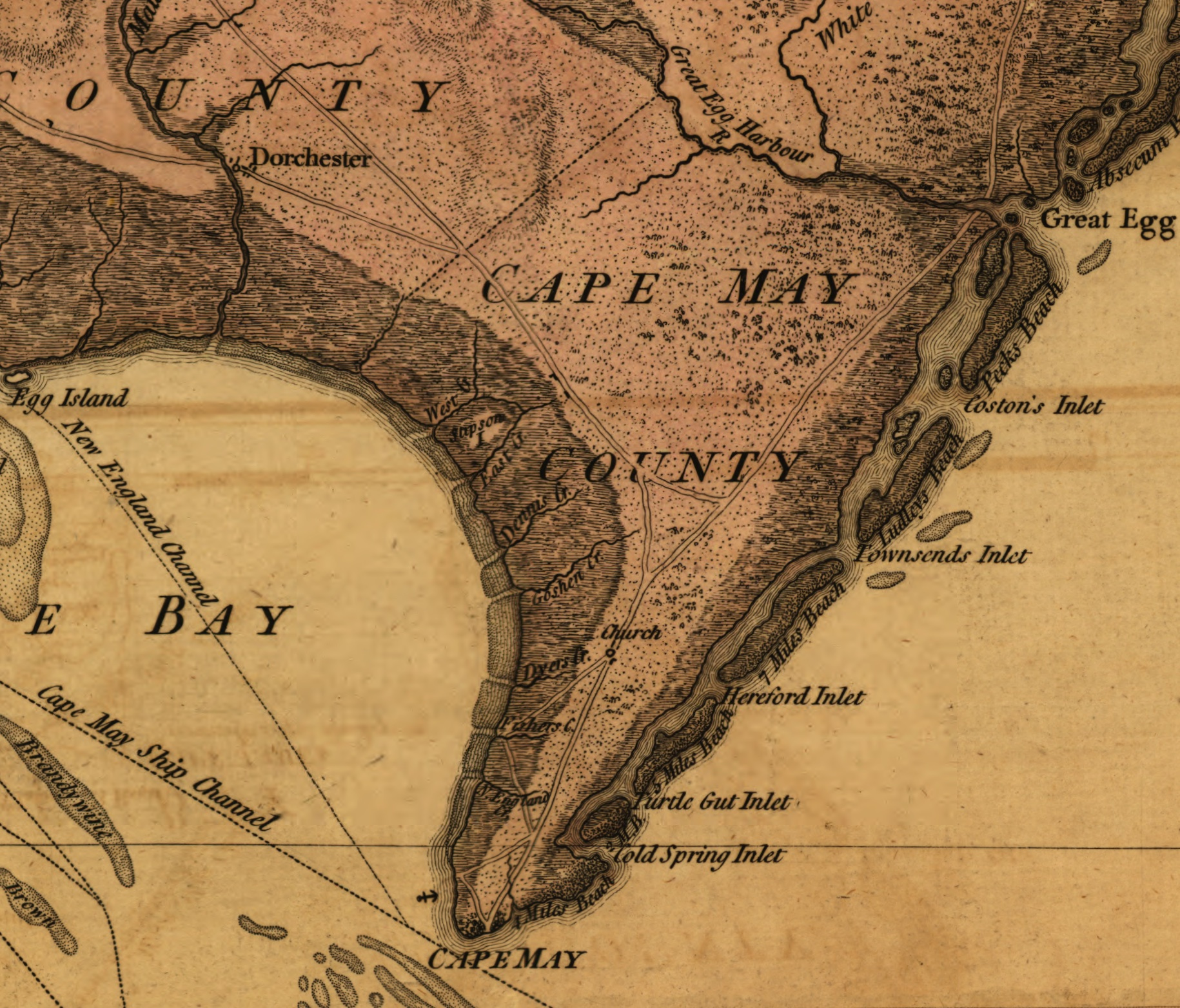
- Location of Turtle Gut Inlet on 1777 map

- Location within Cape May County, New Jersey Location within New Jersey Location within the United States
- Coordinates: 38°57′34″N 74°51′09″W
- Type: Inlet

Turtle Gut Inlet was an inlet located in what is now Wildwood Crest, in Cape May County, New Jersey, United States.

== Geography ==
Turtle Gut Inlet was approximately located at the site of Diamond Beach in Lower Township, which is partially on Two Mile Beach and partially on land reclaimed as a result of the closure of Turtle Gut Inlet.

== History ==
Turtle Gut Inlet is labeled as Turtle Inlet on a 1706 map by John Thornton, and as Turtle Gutt on a map published in 1749 by Lewis Evans.

In June 1776, the naval Battle of Turtle Gut Inlet was fought in the inlet and in the adjacent Atlantic Ocean. This was the only battle of the American Revolutionary War to be fought in Cape May County.

Turtle Gut Inlet was described in 1834 as,

Turtle Gut Inlet, Lower t-ship, Cape May co., between Five Mile and Two Mile Beach.

Turtle Gut Inlet was described in 1878, viz.,

Turtle Gut Inlet is a small channel connecting Richardson and Grassy Sounds with the ocean. It has three feet of water on its bar.

The closing of Turtle Gut Inlet in 1922 has made Two Mile Beach continuous with Five Mile Beach. Sunset Lake is a remnant of Turtle Gut Inlet.
