= Chatham, New Jersey =

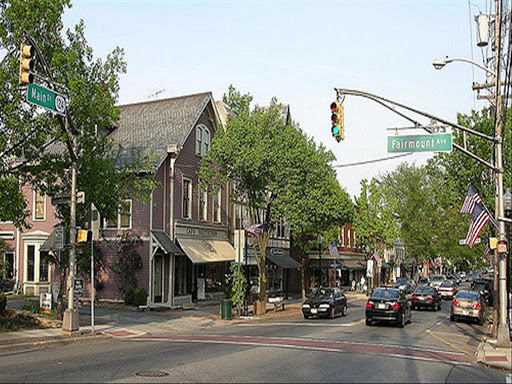
- Main Street in Downtown Chatham

- Location in Morris County Location in New Jersey Location in the United States
- Coordinates: 40.740686°N 74.38448°W
- Country: United States
- State: New Jersey
- County: Morris
- Municipalities: Chatham Borough and Chatham Township
- Named for: William Pitt, 1st Earl of Chatham
- Time zone: UTC−05:00 (Eastern (EST))
  - Summer (DST): UTC−04:00 (Eastern (EDT))
- ZIP code: 07928

"The Chathams" (/tʃæt.əm/, CHAT-əm) is a term used in reference to shared services for two neighboring municipalities in Morris County, New Jersey, United States – Chatham and Chatham Township. The two are separate municipalities, although when sharing some services act much like one cohesive community (hence "The Chathams").

The first municipality, a town that was settled in 1710 as a colonial English village in the Province of New Jersey, that in 1773 adopted a name change to "Chatham". There are numerous references to this village as "Chatham, New Jersey" dating from that time.

The second municipality, more southern, without a town center, and less densely populated until very recently, is the vestige of a regional government that was formed in 1806 as a township, a form of municipal government peculiar to the state of New Jersey. It had jurisdiction over a region including a large area of open space and several villages. One of those, the village of Chatham, dating from 1710, was the source for its name, "Chatham Township". It was mostly rural with expansive farmlands and open land until very late in the twentieth century and until the township school district was formed, its children were bussed to public and private schools in the closest municipality, Madison or Chatham.

Chatham and Chatham Township now share various joint public services: the school district, the library, the municipal court, the medical emergency squad, and recreation program.

In 2012, Forbes.com listed Chatham as 375th in its listing of "America's Most Expensive ZIP Codes", with a median home price of $776,703. In March 2018, Bloomberg ranked Chatham as the 64th wealthiest place in the United States, and the 8th wealthiest in New Jersey.

== History ==
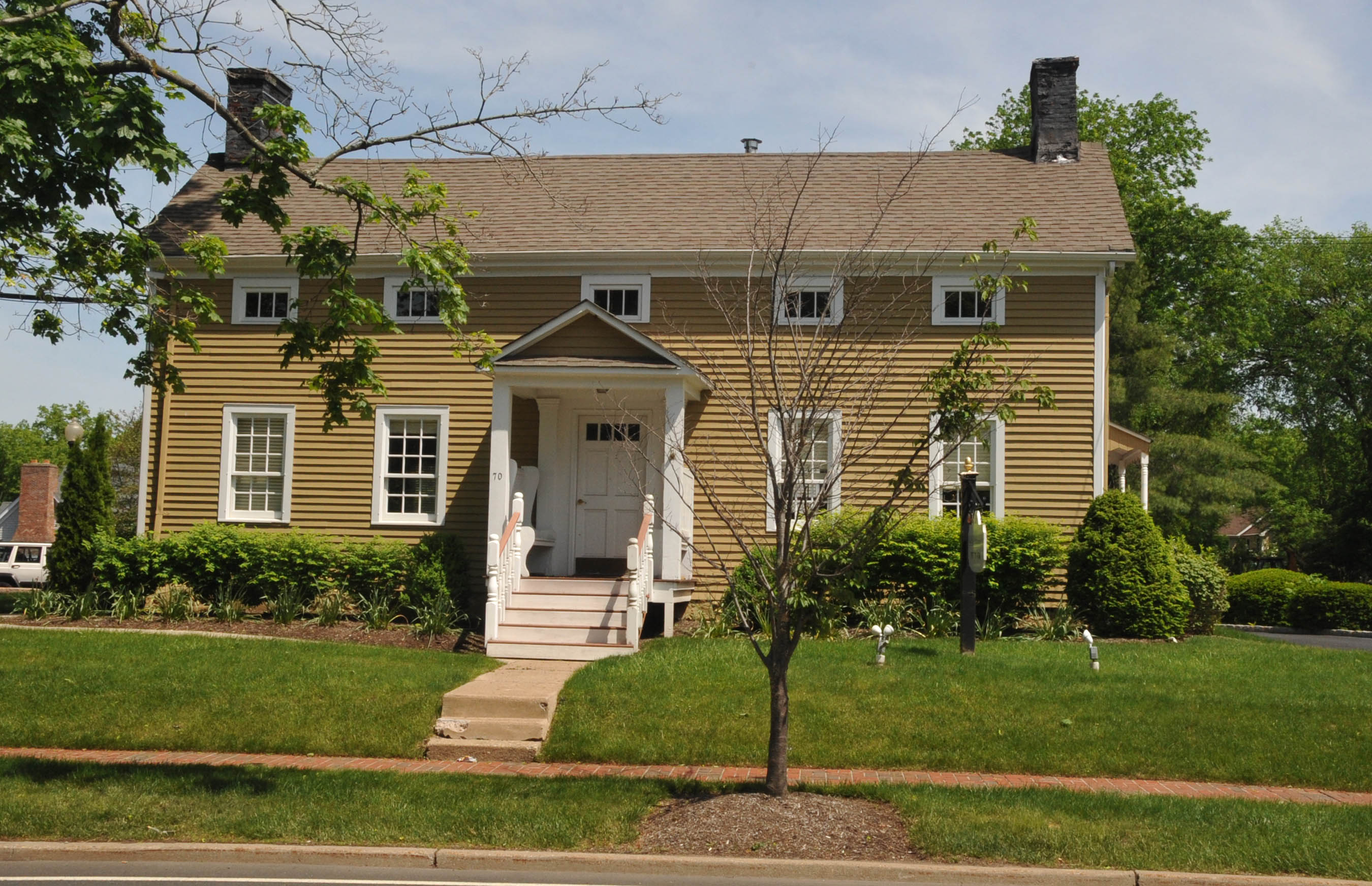
Historic William Day House

The newly established, post-Revolutionary War state of New Jersey went through several stages setting out how its local governments would be structured. Townships were drawn that included villages and open land. Once boroughs became available in New Jersey as a form of local government after 1878, between 1889 and 1899 Chatham Township lost all but one of the villages drawn into it, including Chatham (settled in 1710), which had been drawn into the new township in 1806. They seceded as soon as the bourough form of government became available.

Only Green Village, another early town that, like Chatham, dates to colonial times, was left under jurisdiction of "Chatham Township".

On August 19, 1892, the citizens of Chatham reincorporated with another new type of village government offered as an alternative within townships by New Jersey as it developed. The village of Chatham then reincorporated for governance as a borough by an Act of the New Jersey Legislature on March 1, 1897 regaining independence from Chatham Township.

The Continental Army’s First Winter Encampment January – May 1777 in the Lowantica Valley (modern spelling Loantaka ) Morris County, Chatham Township, New Jersey. After successfully crossing the Delaware River, with subsequent battles in Trenton and Princeton, General Washington marched to Morristown, NJ and made his headquarters in Arnold’s Tavern on the Morristown Green. Most of the army was sent a few miles southeast to the Lowantica Valley (modern spelling Loantaka) in present day Chatham Township. Site is North of Loantaka Brook, East of Tredwell Avenue West of Giralda Farms. In 2016, the Morris County Park Commission and the Chatham Township Historical Society began working together to reclaim the area and create trails and apply for grants for informational signage.

== Shared services ==
The municipalities of Chatham and Chatham Township now share various joint public services: the school district (School District of the Chathams, created in 1986), the library (since 1974), the municipal court (created 2010), the medical emergency squad (since 1936), and the decades long, recreation program.

=== Public schools ===
The municipalities of Chatham and Chatham Township held elections in November 1986 to consider joining their separate school districts. This proposal was supported by the voters of both and they now share a regionalized school district, the School District of the Chathams.

==== Elementary schools ====
- Milton Avenue School. Grades Pre-K - 2. Principal - Kristen Crawford. For the 2014-15 school year, the Milton Avenue School was recognized with a Blue Ribbon School Award by the United States Department of Education, the highest award an American school can receive.
- Southern Boulevard School. Grades K - 2. Principal - Marco Freyre.
- Washington Avenue School. Grades K - 2. Principal - Kristine Dudlo.
- Lafayette School. Grades 3 & 4. Principal - Cheryl Russo.

==== Middle school ====
- Chatham Middle School Grades 5 - 8. Principal - Anthony "Tony" Orsini. Vice Principals - Peter "Pete" Trebour and Sean Devine.

==== High school ====
- Chatham High School. Grades 9 - 12. Principal - Douglas "Doug" Walker. Vice Principals - Lori Gironda and Connor Henderson.

For the 2004-05 school year, the high school was recognized with a Blue Ribbon School Award by the United States Department of Education, the highest award an American school can receive.

The school was the 20th-ranked public high school in New Jersey out of 328 schools statewide in New Jersey Monthly magazine's September 2012 cover story on the state's "Top Public High Schools", after being ranked 8th in 2010 out of 322 schools listed. It was the 12th-ranked public high school in New Jersey out of 316 schools statewide, in New Jersey Monthly magazine's September 2006 cover story on the state's Top Public High Schools.

=== Library ===
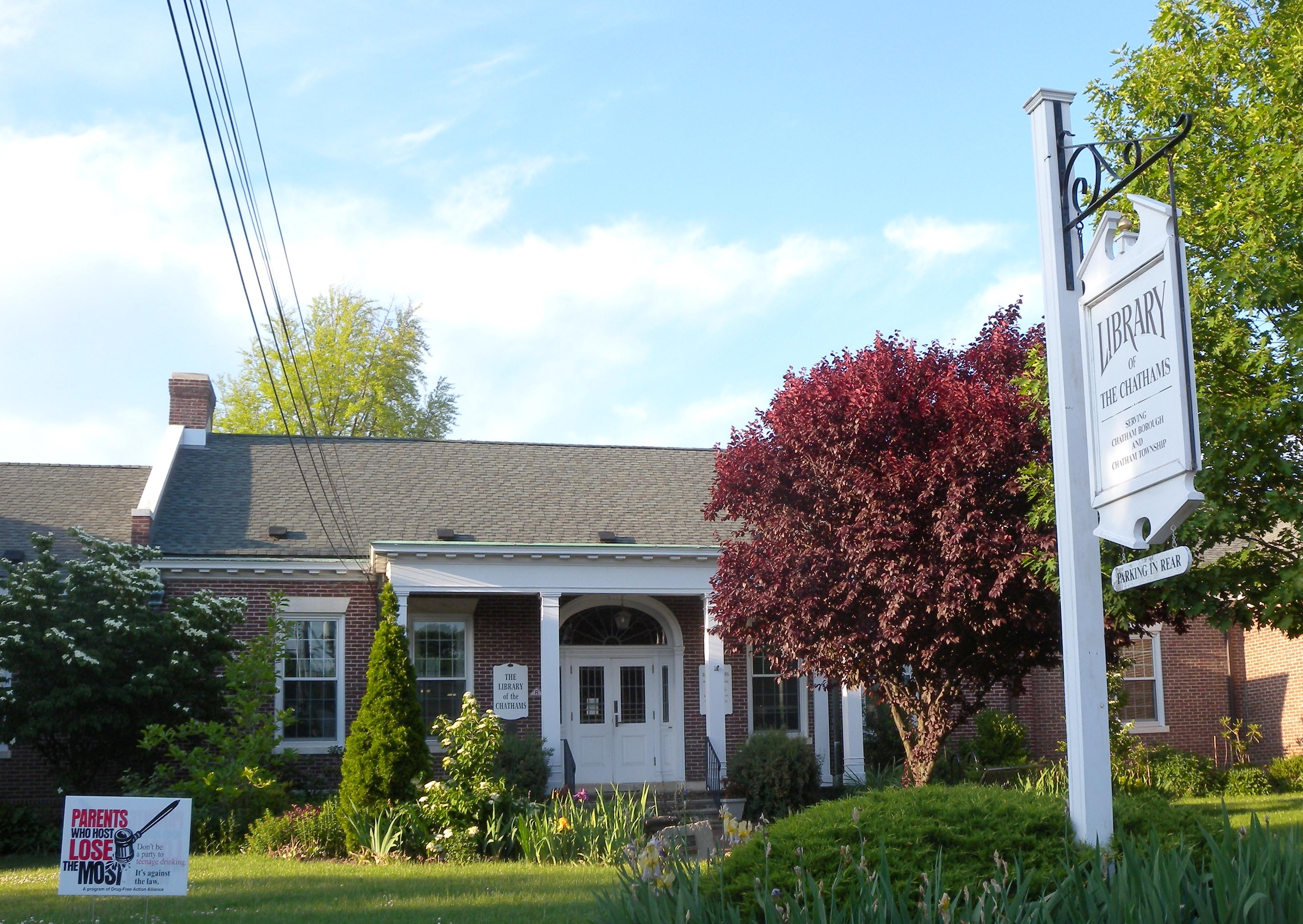
Library building on Main Street in Chatham Borough

A library was founded in Chatham Borough in 1907. Located in a number of different shared buildings, a site for a separate building for the library was chosen after the Fairview Hotel on Main Street burned down. The hotel land was bought after a borough-wide solicitations of funds that was proposed by Charles M. Lum, after whose family Lum Avenue is named, and a brick building was constructed to house the library. John H. Eastwood of Belleville, New Jersey, a client of R. E. Lum, bequeathed $30,000 upon his death in 1924 for the construction of the library as a memorial to his own father, John H. Eastwood Sr., and Ralph E. Lum’s father, Frederick H. Lum, who were close friends. The building was dedicated as the Chatham Public Library, and it opened to the public in 1924. Residents of Chatham Borough were able to join. This location continues to house the library.

As the population of Chatham Township began to grow in the 1960s, services were extended to students in the township elementary school. In 1974, a referendum was placed on the November ballot for Jointure, which was to form a library for both towns. The measure passed and the library began to serve all township residents as well. The library, renamed the Library of The Chathams, now serves both municipalities.

The library is administered by six trustees, who are appointed jointly by the councils of both municipalities and their mayors (or their representatives), as well as a representative from the joint school district.

In 1985 the library joined the Morris Automated Information Network (MAIN), an electronic database linking together all the public libraries in Morris County. An expansion costing nearly $4,000,000 (with the governments of both Chatham Borough and Chatham Township contributing a combined $2,000,000) was completed and dedicated on January 11, 2004.

The library also has a 9/11 memorial with 7 doves to represent the 13 citizens who lost their lives in the September 11 attacks.

=== Municipal court ===
Chatham Township and Chatham Borough are members of the Borough of Madison Joint Municipal Court, which also has jurisdiction over Harding Township. The joint court was created in 2010 and is located in Madison.

=== Emergency services ===
The Chatham Emergency Squad, which operates from two buildings, one in the Borough and one in the Township, provides emergency and non-emergency response for medical services, assistance for seniors and the disabled, and ambulance transportation to area hospitals and local nursing homes. All volunteer, squad members are certified by the state of New Jersey as Emergency Medical Technicians (EMTs).

When first established in 1936, it drew its members from the Chatham Fire Department. Its limited membership made it unable to meet the increasing demand for its services to the growing Chatham Township that was being developed with many new residences.

In early 1951, the borough council was petitioned to authorize reorganization of the Squad as a unit independent of the Fire Department. The Chatham Emergency Squad, Inc. was then established as an independent corporation. It could then draw on regular citizens from the borough and the township for membership.

Chatham has one municipal building for its medical squad members (North Passaic Avenue) and another for its firefighting personnel (Fire House Plaza) — both centered in what was the pre-colonial village.

Chatham Township has a municipal building for its medical squad members in Rolling Hill. Due to its sweeping landscape and the Great Swamp, Chatham Township is served by three departments: one on River Road (below The Highlands, on the edge of town bordering with New Providence), one on Southern Boulevard (near Wickham Woods), and the last in Green Village (on Green Village Road).

=== Recreation ===
The Chatham Recreation is a joint venture of Chatham Borough Recreation and Chatham Township Recreation. It coordinates its activities with the Chatham Borough Council, the Chatham Township Committee, and the School District of the Chathams.

It offers a variety of indoor and outdoor recreational and sports activities at various municipal buildings, parks, fields, gyms, and school locations. It employs volunteers for supervision and refereeing of these activities.

=== Residency ===
The two municipalities contain a number of distinguished neighborhoods — each with unique characteristics. Highly common throughout, however, are tree-lined streets, belgian block curbs, and manicured lawns. The 07928 zip code is highly sought after, with some Chatham residents being amongst some of the wealthiest in New Jersey. Across "The Chathams", the median home value lies at $976,200 (as of 2022) — up from $876,400 the year prior.

The municipality of Chatham is home to Chatham Village, Haaside, the Manor Section, Manor Woods, Mansion Row, Mount Stanley, Upper Washington, and Washington. The median home value lies at $944,600 (as of 2022) for the borough.

Conversely, Chatham Township is home to Chatham Heights, Floral Hill, High Gate, Rolling Hill, The Highlands, and Wickham Woods. Within Chatham Township, the median home value lies at $1,025,300 (as of 2022).

== Notable people ==
- Dan McHale, basketball coach
- Calvin B. T. Lee, chancellor of University of Maryland
- Alex Laferriere, NHL player
- Marianne Espinosa, New Jersey Superior Court Judge

== See also ==
For other groups of similarly named municipalities in New Jersey, see:

- The Amboys
- The Brunswicks
- The Caldwells
- The Oranges
- The Plainfields
- The Wildwoods

== Sources ==
- The New Jersey municipal data book ed. by Ruth R. Hornor. Palo Alto, CA: Information Publications, 2005. Entries on Chatham Borough and Chatham Township.
