= Two Mile Beach =

Barrier island in New Jersey, United States

Coordinates: 38.9572°N 74.8533°W

Two Mile Beach is a barrier island on the Jersey Shore in Cape May County, since 1922 connected to Five Mile Beach.

== Geography ==
Two Mile Beach is a barrier island along the Atlantic Ocean between the former Turtle Gut Inlet on the northeast, and Cape May or Cold Spring Inlet on the southwest. Sunset Lake and Jarvis Sound, as well as an expanse of salt marsh and tidal channels, separates Two Mile Beach from the mainland. The closing of Turtle Gut Inlet in 1922 has made Two Mile Beach continuous with Five Mile Beach.

Two Mile Beach was described in 1834 as,

Two Mile Beach, on the Atlantic ocean, Lower t-ship, Cape May co., between Turtle Gut and Cold Spring Inlet.

An 1878 description of Two Mile Beach is as follows, viz,

Two Mile Beach was well covered with timber forty years ago; but the lumberman's axe and the encroaching sea have converted into a nearly bare and sandy waste. It is about two miles long.

== Communities ==
The only community on the island is Diamond Beach, a part of Lower Township, which is partially on Two Mile Beach and partially on land reclaimed as a result of the closure of Turtle Gut Inlet; The greater part is occupied by the Two Mile Beach Unit of the Cape May National Wildlife Refuge and a former United States Coast Guard LORAN site.
