= The Wildwoods =

Group of five communities in Cape May County, New Jersey, United States

Coordinates: 38.995°N 74.809°W

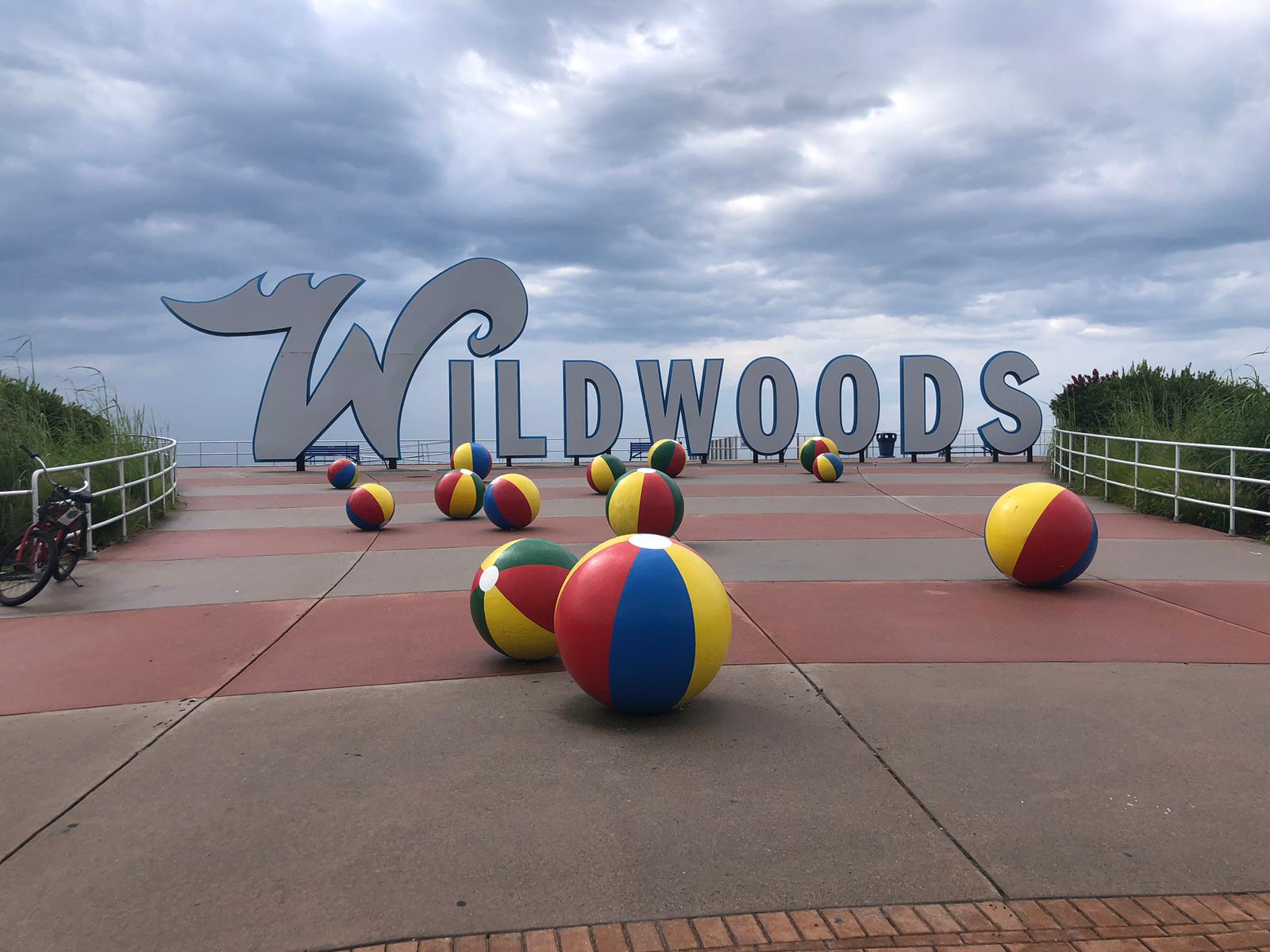
The Wildwoods sign, on the boardwalk in Wildwood.

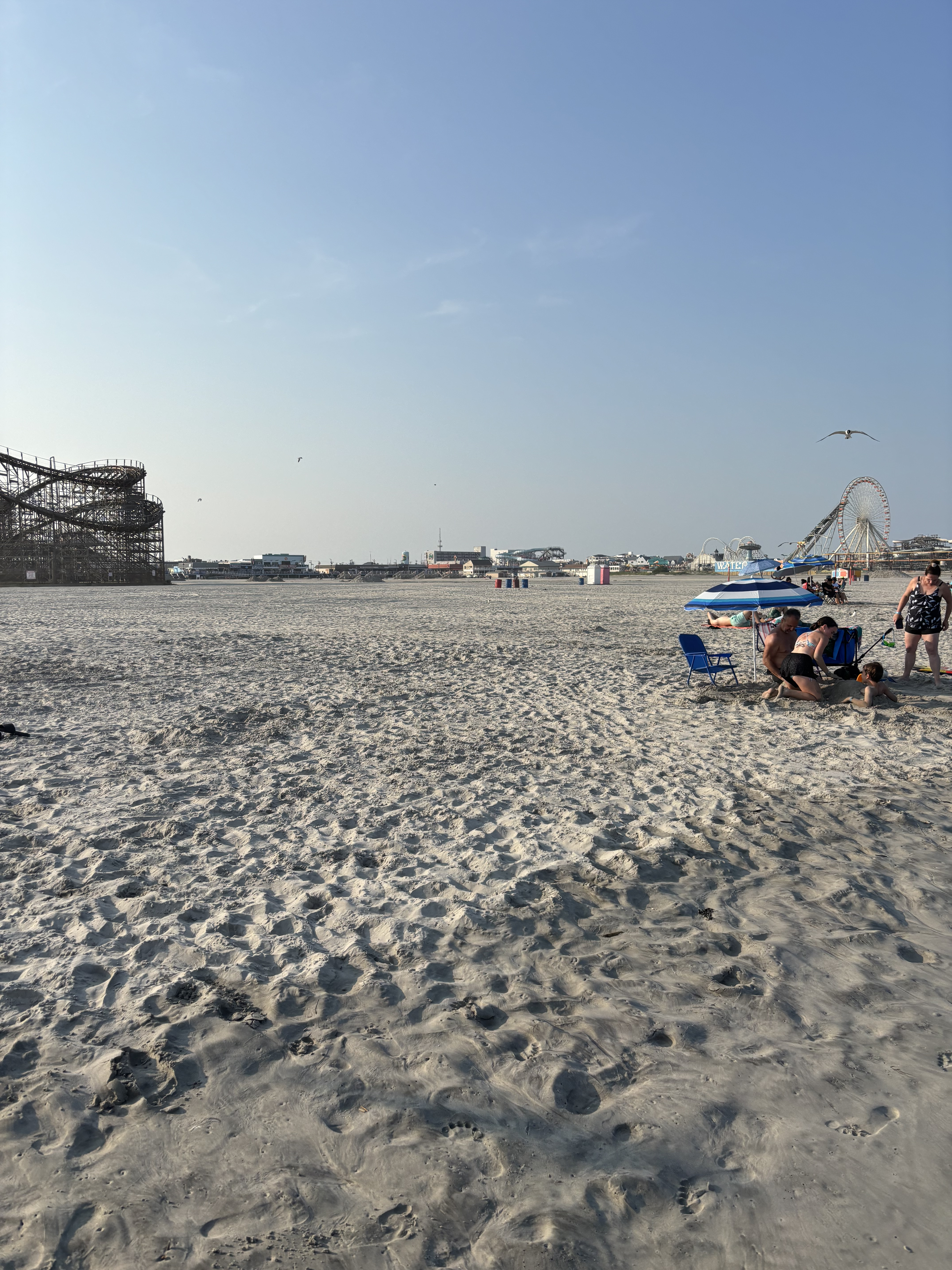
Wildwood Beach in 2025

The Wildwoods are a group of five communities (four distinct municipalities and one census-designated place) in Cape May County, New Jersey. These are situated on the Island of Five Mile Beach, a barrier island facing the Atlantic Ocean. These Jersey Shore communities have relatively small year-round populations that swell significantly during the summer with vacationers.

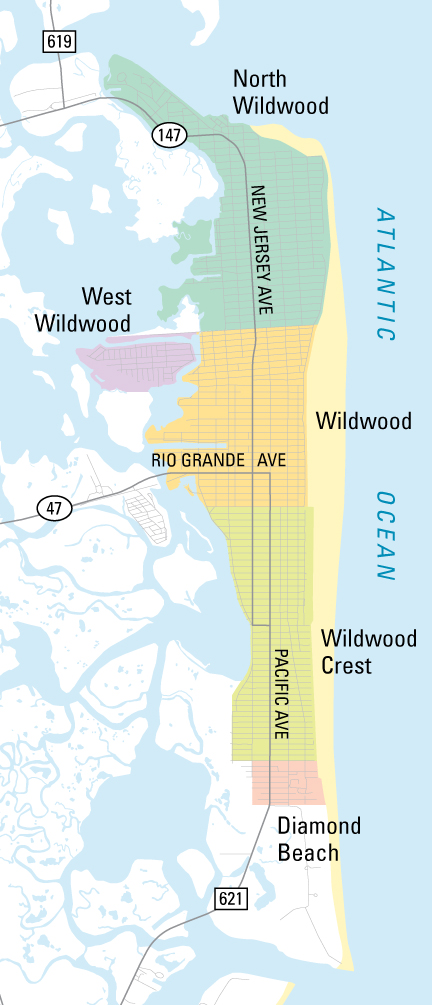
Wildwoods Communities

While the communities have no shared governance (other than Cape May County), with each community reporting to a different local government, the term is often used to refer collectively to the area. There is a Wildwoods Tourism Improvement District. The Greater Wildwood Chamber of Commerce was founded in 1938 and promotes business and tourism in the Wildwoods.

All of the communities are part of the greater Philadelphia metropolitan area.

From north to south, the five communities are:

- North Wildwood (2010 Census population: 4,041)
- West Wildwood (pop. 603)
- Wildwood (pop. 5,325)
- Wildwood Crest (pop. 3,270)
- Diamond Beach (pop. 136), a census-designated place in Lower Township

The Wildwoods have proposed merging to reduce government costs, but concerns about stability of property taxes and local control have hindered efforts.

== Geography ==
Five Mile Beach is a barrier island along the Atlantic Ocean between Hereford Inlet on the northeast, and the former Turtle Gut Inlet on the southwest. Grassy Sound, Richardson Sound, Taylor Sound and Sunset Lake, as well as an expanse of salt marsh and tidal channels separates Five Mile Beach from the mainland. The closing of Turtle Gut Inlet in 1922 has made Five Mile Beach continuous with Two Mile Beach.

Five Mile Beach was described in 1834 as

Five Mile Beach, between Hereford and Turtle Gut inlets, partly in Middle and partly in Lower t-ship, Cape May co., of a wedge-like form, having in its greatest width about a mile.

An 1878 description of Five Mile Beach is as follows, viz,

Five Mile Beach is now between four and five miles long, and was formerly well timbered. This has been largely taken off in recent years. A lighthouse has been placed on the northeastern end of the island, near Hereford Inlet.

== Wildwoods Shore Resort Historic District ==
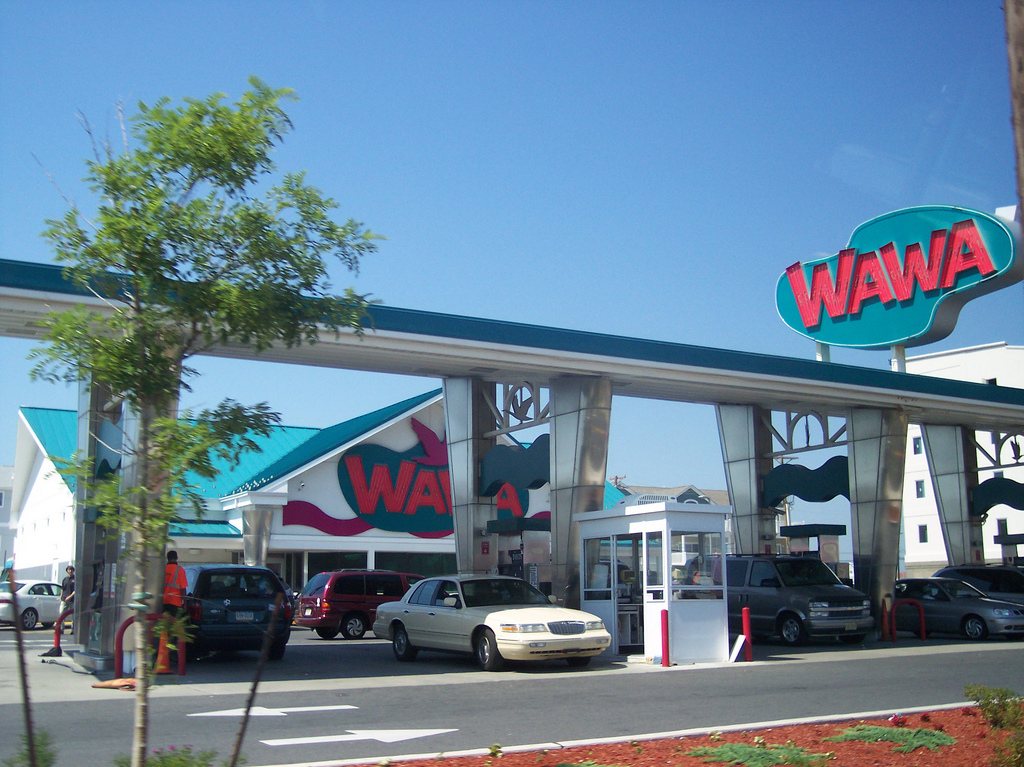
Doo-wop styled Wawa Food Market.

The Wildwoods is home to over 200 motels, built during the Doo-Wop era of the 1950s and 1960s, in an area recognized by the state of New Jersey known as the Wildwoods Shore Resort Historic District. The term doo-wop was coined by Cape May's Mid-Atlantic Center For The Arts in the early 1990s to describe the unique, space-age architectural style, which is also referred to as the Googie or populuxe style.

== See also ==
For other groups of similarly named municipalities in New Jersey, see:

- The Amboys
- The Brunswicks
- The Caldwells
- The Chathams
- The Oranges
- The Plainfields
