= Cinnamon Hill =

Great house and sugar plantation in Jamaica

Coordinates: 18.5029°N 77.7996°W

Cinnamon Hill is a great house and sugar plantation associated with the Cornwall plantation located in St James Parish, Jamaica. It is close to Rose Hall and overlooks the sea. The house was started by Samuel Barrett junior (d. 1760), who had bought the Cornwall Estate. However he died and the work was continued by his son Edward Barrett (1734–1798). Edward also completed the Cinnamon Hill sugar works in 1784.

The plantation is also said to be haunted by the White Witch. The namesake of a golf course on the estate grounds.

Johnny Cash purchased the property in 1972 and lived there part time until his death in 2003.
