= John Castello =

Guyanese child actor and journalist (1802–1877)

- Born: John Anderson Castello; 1802; British Guiana
- Died: 1877 (aged 74–75); Jamaica
- Other name: "The West Indian Roscius"
- Occupations: Child actor and journalist

John Anderson Castello (1802, British Guiana – 1877, Jamaica) was a Guyanese child actor and journalist who established his reputation in Jamaica, whither he moved as a teenager. Following Master Betty, known as "the Young Roscius", Castello was called "the West Indian Roscius". He performed in Spanish Town in October 1816 at the age of thirteen. Castello remained popular with Jamaican theatre-goers until 1818, when he reached puberty and his voice broke.

== Theatrical career ==
William Adamson, who managed his own theatre company, had arrived from Barbados, produced John Home's Douglas or the Noble Shepherd and cast Castello in the role of the Young Norval. When Castello performed the role of Lothair in Matthew Gregory Lewis' Adelgitha, the author – who was in the audience – complained about the performance. With the death of Adamson that year, his replacement, Mr Burnett, refused to pay Castello the same rate as adult members of the cast, and his last performance with Burnett's company took place in December 1818. In July 1919, he appeared at the Pavilion Theatre, New York in the role of Caleb Quotem in George Colman's play The Wags of Windsor. However no accounts of further theatrical performance exist until he resurfaced in Kingston Theatre, Jamaica in July 1828 where he delivered George Alexander Stevens's comic monologue The Lecture on Heads. In 1829, he joined the English Company and continued to perform in Kingston.

== Journalist career ==
In 1836, Castello bought the Falmouth Post, which he then published and edited as a weekly newspaper up until his death in 1877.
