= Falmouth Post =

Jamaican newspaper

The Falmouth Post was newspaper established in 1834 Falmouth, Trelawny Parish, Jamaica to promote the full freedom for the enslaved Africans who had been obliged to work unpaid as "Apprentices" by the Slavery Abolition Act 1833.

It was bought by John Castello in 1836.
